= List of banks (alphabetical) =

This is a list of notable banks, sorted alphabetically.

== A ==
- Aareal Bank, Wiesbaden, Germany
- Aargauische Kantonalbank, Aarau, Switzerland
- Abacus Federal Savings Bank, New York, United States
- AB Bank, Dhaka, Bangladesh
- AB SEB bankas, Vilnius, Lithuania
- ABC Islamic Bank, Manama, Bahrain
- ABC Bank (Kenya), Nairobi, Kenya
- ABC Bank (Uganda), Kampala, Uganda
- Abhyudaya Co-operative Bank Ltd, Mumbai, India
- ABLV Bank, AS, Riga, Latvia
- ABN AMRO, Amsterdam, Netherlands
- ABN AMRO Group, Amsterdam, Netherlands
- Absa Group Limited, Johannesburg, South Africa
- Abu Dhabi Commercial Bank, Abu Dhabi, United Arab Emirates
- Abu Dhabi Islamic Bank, Abu Dhabi, United Arab Emirates
- ACBA-Credit Agricole Bank, Yerevan, Armenia
- Access Bank Azerbaijan, Baku, Azerbaijan
- Access Bank Group, Lagos, Nigeria
- AccessBank Liberia, Monrovia, Liberia
- Access Bank plc, Lagos, Nigeria
- Access Bank Rwanda, Kigali, Rwanda
- AccessBank Azerbaijan, Baku, Azerbaijan
- AccessBank Tajikistan, Dushanbe, Tajikistan
- Access Bank Zambia, Lusaka, Zambia
- Achmea Bank, The Hague, Netherlands
- Achmea Hypotheekbank, Den Bosch, Netherlands
- Acleda Bank, Phnom Penh, Cambodia
- Acleda Bank Myanmar, Yangon, Myanmar
- Adabank, Istanbul, Turkey
- Addiko Bank, Klagenfurt, Austria
- AEK Bank 1826, Thun, Switzerland
- Affin Bank, Kuala Lumpur, Malaysia
- Afghanistan International Bank, Kabul, Afghanistan
- AfrAsia Bank Limited, Port Louis, Mauritius
- Afrasia Bank Zimbabwe Limited, Harare, Zimbabwe
- African Bank, Midrand, South Africa
- African Export–Import Bank (Afreximbank), Cairo, Egypt
- African Investment Bank, Tripoli, Libya
- Afriland First Bank, Yaoundé, Cameroon
- Agrani Bank, Dhaka, Bangladesh
- Agricultural Bank of Libya, Tripoli, Libya
- Agricultural Bank of China, Beijing, China
- Agricultural Cooperative Bank of Iraq, Baghdad, Iraq
- Agricultural Development Bank of Ghana, Accra, Ghana
- Agriculture Development Bank, Ramshah Path, Kathmandu
- Agrobank, Kuala Lumpur, Malaysia
- Agroindustrijsko Komercijalna Banka, Nis, Serbia
- Agroinvestbank, Dushanbe, Tajikistan
- Ahli Bank Qatar, Doha, Qatar
- Ahli United Bank, Manama, Bahrain
- Ahli United Bank Kuwait, Safat, Kuwait
- Aichi Bank, Nagoya, Japan
- AIK Banka, Belgrade, Serbia
- Ajman Bank, Ajman, United Arab Emirates
- Ak Bars Holding, Kazan, Russia
- Akbank, Istanbul, Turkey
- Akiba Commercial Bank, Dar es Salaam, Tanzania
- Akita Bank, Akita, Japan
- Aktia Bank, Helsinki, Finland
- Al Ahli Bank of Kuwait, Safat, Kuwait
- Al-Amanah Islamic Investment Bank of the Philippines, Zamboanga City, Philippines
- Al-Arafah Islami Bank Limited, Dhaka, Bangladesh
- Alawwal Bank, Riyadh, Saudi
- Albaraka Türk, Istanbul, Turkey
- Al Baraka Banking Group, Manama, Bahrain
- Albaraka Türk, Istanbul, Turkey
- Al Bilad Bank, Riyadh, Saudi Arabia
- Al Hilal Bank, Abu Dhabi, United Arab Emirates
- Al Rajhi Bank, Riyadh, Saudi Arabia
- Al Rajhi Bank Malaysia, Kuala Lumpur, Malaysia
- Al Shamal Islamic Bank, Khartoum, Sudan
- Al Watany Bank of Egypt (AWB), Giza, Egypt
- Alfa-Bank, Moscow, Russia
- Alfa-Bank, Kyiv, Ukraine
- Alinma Bank, Riyadh, Saudi
- Alior Bank, Warsaw, Poland
- Allahabad Bank, Calcutta, India
- Allbank Panama, Panama City, Panama
- Allgemeine Sparkasse Oberosterreich, Linz, Austria
- Alliance Bank JSC, Almaty, Kazakhstan
- Alliance Bank Malaysia Berhad, Kuala Lumpur, Malaysia
- Allianz, Munich, Germany
- Allied Bank Limited, Lahore, Pakistan
- Allied Banking Corporation, Makati, Philippines
- Allied Bank Zimbabwe Limited, Harare, Zimbabwe
- Allied Irish Banks (AIB), Dublin, Ireland
- Alterna Bank, Ontario, Canada
- Alternatif Bank, Istanbul, Turkey
- Ally Financial, Detroit, United States
- Aloqabank, Tashkent, Uzbekistan
- AlpenBank, Innsbruck, Austria
- Alpha Bank, Athens, Greece
- Alpha Bank Albania, Tirana, Albania
- Alpha Bank Cyprus, Nicosia, Cyprus
- Alpha Bank Romania, Bucharest, Romania
- Alpha Bank Skopje, Skopje, Macedonia
- Alpha Bank UK, London, United Kingdom
- Alternatif Bank, Istanbul, Turkey
- Amagasaki Shinkin Bank, Amagasaki, Japan
- AmalBank, Accra, Ghana
- Amalgamated Bank, New York, United States
- Amalgamated Bank of Chicago, Chicago, United States
- Amana Bank, Dar es Salaam, Tanzania
- Amana Bank (Sri Lanka), Sri Lanka
- AM Bank, Beirut, Lebanon
- AmBank Group, Kuala Lumpur, Malaysia
- Amen Bank, Tunis, Tunisia
- Ameriabank, Yerevan, Armenia
- American Continental Bank, Los Angeles, United States
- American National Bank of Texas, Terrell, Texas, United States
- American National Corporation, Omaha, United States
- American Premier Bank, Arcadia, United States
- Ameris Bancorp, Jacksonville, United States
- Amin Investment Bank, Tehran, Iran
- AMP Limited, Sydney, Australia
- Amsterdam Trade Bank, Amsterdam, Netherlands
- Anadolubank, Istanbul, Turkey
- Andbank, Andorra La Vella, Andorra
- Andbank Panama, Panama City, Panama
- Andhra Bank, Hyderabad, India
- Ansar-VDP Unnayan Bank, Dhaka, Bangladesh
- Antwerp Diamond Bank, Antwerp, Belgium
- ANZ Amerika Samoa Bank, Pago Pago, American Samoa
- ANZ Bank, Melbourne, Australia
- ANZ Bank New Zealand, Auckland, New Zealand
- ANZ Royal Bank, Phom Penh, Cambodia
- Aomori Bank, Aomori, Japan
- Aozora Bank, Tokyo, Japan
- Appenzeller Kantonalbank, Appenzell, Switzerland
- Apple Bank for Savings, New York, United States
- APS Bank, Birkirkara, Malta
- Arab Bangladesh Bank, Dhaka, Bangladesh
- Arab Bank, Amman, Jordan
- Bank ABC, Manama, Bahrain
- Arab Banking Corporation Algeria, Algiers, Algeria
- Arab Banking Corporation Brasil, São Paulo, Brazil
- Arab Banking Corporation Egypt, Cairo, Egypt
- Arab Banking Corporation Jordan, Amman, Jordan
- Arab Banking Corporation Tunisia, Tunis, Tunisia
- Arab Israel Bank, Nesher, Israel
- Arab National Bank (ANB), Riyadh, Saudi Arabia
- Arab Tunisian Bank (ATB), Tunis, Tunisia
- Arbejdernes Landsbank, Copenhagen, Denmark
- Arbuthnot Latham, London, United Kingdom
- ArdShinInvestBank, Yerevan, Armenia
- Argenta Group, Antwerp, Belgium
- Argenta (bank), Antwerp, Belgium
- Arion Bank, Reykjavik, Iceland
- Arkada Bank, Kyiv, Ukraine
- ArmSwissBank, Yerevan, Armenia
- Artsakhbank, Yerevan, Armenia
- Arvest Bank, Bentonville, United States
- AS SEB Pank, Tallinn, Estonia
- Asahi Shinkin Bank, Tokyo, Japan
- ASB Bank, Auckland, New Zealand
- Asia Commercial Bank (ACB), Ho Chi Minh City, Vietnam
- Asia Green Development Bank, Yangon, Myanmar
- Asia United Bank, Pasig, Philippines
- Askari Bank, Rawalpindi, Pakistan
- ASN Bank, The Hague, Netherlands
- Astoria Bank, Lake Success, United States
- AtaBank, Baku, Azerbaijan
- Atlantic Bank Group, Lome, Togo
- Atlas Mara Bank Zambia Limited, Lusaka, Zambia
- Attica Bank, Athens, Greece
- Attijariwafa Bank, Casablanca, Morocco
- Auburn National Bancorporation, Auburn, United States
- Aurskog Sparebank, Aurskog, Norway
- AU Small Finance Bank, Rajasthan, India
- Auswide Bank, Bundaberg, Australia
- Awash International Bank, Addis Ababa, Ethiopia
- Axa Bank Belgium, Brussels, Belgium
- Axis Bank, Mumbai, India
- Ayandeh Bank, Tehran, Iran
- Ayeyarwady Bank, Yangon, Myanmar
- Azania Bank, Dar es Salaam, Tanzania
- Azer-Turk Bank, Baku, Azerbaijan
- Azerigasbank, Baku, Azerbaijan
- Azizi Bank, Kabul, Afghanistan

== B ==
- B2B Bank, Toronto, Canada
- B&N Bank, Moscow, Russia
- Baader Bank AG, Unterschleißheim, Germany
- Babylon Bank, Baghdad, Iraq
- BAC Credomatic, Managua, Nicaragua
- Bahrain Development Bank, Manama, Bahrain
- Bahrain Islamic Bank (BISB), Manama, Bahrain
- Baiduri Bank, Bandar Seri Begawan, Brunei
- Balboa Bank and Trust, Ciudad de Panamá, Republic of Panama
- BanBajío, Leon, Mexico
- Banc of California, Irvine, United States
- Banca Apulia, San Severo (Foggia), Italy
- BancABC, Gaborone, Botswana
- Banca Carige, Genoa, Italy
- Banca Cassa di Risparmio di Firenze, Florence, Italy
- Banca Cassa di Risparmio di Savigliano, Savigliano, Italy
- Banca Comercială Română, Bucharest, Romania
- Banca delle Marche, Ancona, Italy
- Banca dello Stato del Cantone Ticino, Bellinzona, Switzerland
- Banca dell'Umbria, Perugia, Italy
- Banca del Mezzogiorno – MedioCredito Centrale, Rome, Italy
- Banca del Monte di Lucca, Lucca, Italy
- Banca di Cambiano, Castelfiorentino, Italy
- Banca di Credito Cooperativo di Alba Langhe e Roero, Alba, Italy
- Banca di Credito Popolare, Torre Del Greco, Italy
- Banca di Credito Sardo, Cagliari, Italy
- Banca di Sassari, Sassari, Italy
- Banca Etruria, Arezzo, Italy
- Banca Finnat, Rome, Italy
- Banca Generali, Trieste, Italy
- Banca IFIS, Venice, Italy
- Banca IMI, Milan, Italy
- Banca Intermobiliare, Turin, Italy
- Banca Intesa Beograd, Belgrade, Serbia
- Banca Intesa Russia, Moscow, Russia
- Banca Intesa Serbia, Belgrade, Serbia
- Banca Italease, Milano, Italy
- Banca March, Palma de Mallorca, Spain
- Banca Mediocredito del Friuli Venezia Giulia, Udine, Italy
- Banca Mediolanum, Milano, Italy
- Banca Monte dei Paschi di Siena, Siena, Italy
- Banca Monte Parma, Parma, Italy
- Banca Monte Paschi Belgio, Brussels, Belgium
- Banca Nazionale del Lavoro, Roma, Italy
- Banca Padovana Credito Cooperativo, Campodarsego (Pd), Italy
- Banca Popolare dell'Emilia Romagna, Modena, Italy
- Banca Popolare di Bari, Bari, Italy
- Banca Popolare di Crema, Crema, Italy
- Banca Popolare di Milano, Milano, Italy
- Banca Popolare di Novara, Novara, Italy
- Banca Popolare di Sondrio, Sondrio, Italy
- Banca Popolare di Sondrio Switzerland, Lugano, Switzerland
- Banca Popolare di Spoleto, Spoleto, Italy
- Banca Popolare di Vicenza, Vicenza, Italy
- Banca Popolare FriulAdria, Pordenone, Italy
- Banca Privada d'Andorra, Escaldes-Engordany, Andorra
- Banca Prossima, Milano, Italy
- Banca Pueyo, Badajoz, Spain
- Banca Regionale Europea, Milano, Italy
- Bancaribe, Caracas, Venezuela
- Banca Romaneasca, Bucharest, Romania
- Banca Sella, Biella, Italy
- Banca Transilvania, Cluj-Napoca, Romania
- Banco Alfa, São Paulo, Brazil
- Banco Amambay, Asunción, Paraguay
- Banco Angolano de Investimentos, Luanda, Angola
- Banco AV Villas, Bogotá D.C., Colombia
- Banco Azteca, Iztapalapa, Mexico
- Banco BICE, Santiago, Chile
- Banco Bicentenario, Caracas, Venezuela
- Banco Bilbao Vizcaya Argentaria, Bilbao, Spain
- Banco BPM, Milan, Italy
- Banco BISA, La Paz, Bolivia
- Banco BMG, São Paulo, Brazil
- Banco Bradesco, São Paulo, Brazil
- Banco Caboverdiano de Negócios, Praia, Cape Verde
- Banco Caixa Geral, Vigo, Spain
- Banco Comercial do Atlântico, Santiago, Cape Verde
- Banco Comercial Português, Porto, Portugal
- Banco Continental, San Pedro Sula, Honduras
- Banco Credicoop, Buenos Aires, Argentina
- Banco Crédito y Ahorro Ponceño, Ponce, Puerto Rico
- Banco de Bogota, Bogotá D.C., Colombia
- Banco de Brasilia, Brasilia, Brazil
- Banco de Chile, Santiago, Chile
- Banco de Comércio e Indústria, Angola
- Banco de Costa Rica, San José, Costa Rica
- Banco de Crédito de Bolivia, La Paz, Bolivia
- Banco de Crédito del Perú, Lima, Peru
- Banco de Crédito e Inversiones (BCI), Santiago, Chile
- Banco de Desenvolvimento de Angola, Angola
- Banco de la Nacion, San Isidro, Peru
- Banco de la Nacion Argentina, Buenos Aires, Argentina
- Banco de la Produccion, Managua, Nicaragua
- Banco de la Republica, Montevideo, Uruguay
- Banco de la Republica Oriental del Uruguay, Buenos Aires, Argentina
- Banco de Machala, Machala, Ecuador
- Banco de Occidente, Cali, Colombia
- Banco de Ponce, Ponce, Puerto Rico
- Banco de Portugal, Lisbon, Portugal
- Banco de Poupança e Crédito, Luanda, Angola
- Banco de Sabadell, Sabadell, Spain
- Banco de Valencia, Valencia, Spain
- Banco de Venezuela, Caracas, Venezuela
- Banco del Estado de Chile, Santiago, Chile
- Banco del Pacifico, Guayaquil, Ecuador
- Banco del Sur, Puerto Ordaz, Venezuela
- Banco Delta Asia, Macau, Macao
- Banco di Desio e della Brianza, Desio, Italy
- Banco di Napoli, Naples, Italy
- Banco di Sardegna, Sassari, Italy
- Banco do Nordeste, Fortaleza, Brazil
- Banco do Brasil, Brasilia, Brazil
- Banco Económico (Angola), Luanda, Angola
- Banco Español de Crédito, Madrid, Spain
- Banco Espírito Santo, Lisbon, Portugal
- Banco Espírito Santo Angola, Largo das Ingombotas, Angola
- Banco Falabella, Santiago, Chile
- Banco Gallego, La Coruña, Spain
- Banco Hipotecario, Buenos Aires, Argentina
- Banco Hipotecario del Uruguay (BHU), Montevideo, Uruguay
- Banco Industrial de Venezuela, Caracas, Venezuela
- Banco Interatlântico, Santiago, Cape Verde
- Banco Internacional de Costa Rica, San José, Costa Rica
- Banco Internacional de São Tomé e Príncipe, Sao Tome, Central Africa
- Banco Internacional del Peru, Lima, Peru
- Banco Internacional do Funchal, Lisbon, Portugal
- Banco Invest, Lisbon, Portugal
- Banco Itau Argentina, Buenos Aires, Argentina
- Banco Itau Chile, Santiago, Chile
- Banco Itau Paraguay, Asunción, Paraguay
- Banco Latinoamericano de Comercio Exterior, Panama City, Panama
- Banco Macro, Buenos Aires, Argentina
- Banco Mercantil, Caracas, Venezuela
- Banco Mercantil Santa Cruz, La Paz, Bolivia
- Bancomext, Mexico City, Mexico
- Banco Montepio, Lisbon, Portugal
- Banco Nacional de Bolivia, La Paz, Bolivia
- Banco Nacional de Costa Rica, San José, Costa Rica
- Banco Nacional de Crédito, Caracas, Venezuela
- Banco Nacional de Investimento, Maputo, Mozambique
- Banco Nacional de Panama, Panama City, Panama
- Banco Nacional Ultramarino, Lisbon, Portugal
- Banco Occidental de Descuento, Maracaibo, Venezuela
- Banco Palmas, Ceara, Brazil
- Banco Pan, São Paulo, Brazil
- Banco Paris, Santiago, Chile
- Banco Pastor, La Coruña, Spain
- Banco Patagonia, Buenos Aires, Argentina
- Banco Penta, Santiago, Chile
- Banco Pichincha, Pichincha, Ecuador
- Banco Popolare, Verona, Italy
- Banco Popular, Madrid, Spain
- Banco Português de Investimento (BPI), Porto, Portugal
- Banco Regional, Encarnacion, Paraguay
- Banco Ripley, Santiago, Chile
- Banco Sabadell, Alicante, Spain
- Banco Safra, São Paulo, Brazil
- Banco Santander, Madrid, Spain
- Banco Santander (México) S.A., Mexico City, Mexico
- Banco Santander Argentina, Buenos Aires, Argentina
- Banco Santander Brasil, São Paulo, Brazil
- Banco Santander Chile, Santiago, Chile
- Banco Santander Portugal, Lisbon, Portugal
- Banco Venezolano de Crédito, Caracas, Venezuela
- Banco Votorantim, São Paulo, Brazil
- Bancolombia, Medellin, Colombia
- BancorpSouth, Tupelo, United States
- Bancpost, Bucharest, Romania
- Bancrecer, Caracas, Venezuela
- Bandhan Bank, Kolkata, India
- Banesco, Caracas, Venezuela
- Banestes, Vitoria, Brazil
- Bangkok Bank, Bangkok, Thailand
- Bangladesh Bank, Dhaka, Bangladesh
- Bangladesh Commerce Bank Limited, Dhaka, Bangladesh
- Bangladesh Development Bank, Dhaka, Bangladesh
- Bangladesh Krishi Bank, Dhaka, Bangladesh
- Bangladesh Samabaya Bank Limited, Dhaka, Bangladesh
- Banisi, Panama City, Panama
- Banistmo, Panama City, Panama
- Banka Kombëtare Tregtare, Tirana, Albania
- Bank AL Habib, Multan, Pakistan
- Bank Alfalah, Karachi, Pakistan
- Bank Al-Maghrib, Rabat, Morocco
- Bank Asia Limited, Dhaka, Bangladesh
- Bank Asya, Istanbul, Turkey
- Bank Audi, Beirut, Lebanon
- Bank Australia, Victoria, Australia
- Bank Austria, Vienna, Austria
- Bank BPH, Gdansk, Poland
- Bank Central Asia (BCA), Jakarta, Indonesia
- Bank Day, Tehran, Iran
- Bank Eskhata, Khujand, Tajikistan
- Bank-e-Millie Afghan, Kabul, Afghanistan
- Bank First, Victoria, Australia
- Bank for Investment and Development of Vietnam (BIDV), Ho Chi Minh City, Vietnam
- Bank Forum, Kyiv, Ukraine
- Bank für Sozialwirtschaft, Cologne and Berlin, Germany
- Bank Gaborone, Gaborone, Botswana
- Bank Gospodarstwa Krajowego, Warsaw, Poland
- Bank Gutmann, Vienna, Austria
- Bank Handlowy w Warszawie, Warsaw, Poland
- Bank Hapoalim, Tel Aviv, Israel
- Bankhaus Löbbecke, Berlin, Germany
- Bank im Bistum Essen, Essen, Germany
- Banking Company of West Africa, Dakar, Senegal
- Bank Insinger de Beaufort, Amsterdam, Netherlands
- Bank Internasional Indonesia, Jakarta, Indonesia
- Bank Islam Brunei Darussalam, Bandar Seri Begawan, Brunei
- BankIslami Pakistan, Karachi, Pakistan
- Bank Keshavarzi (Agri Bank), Tehran, Iran
- Bank Leumi, Tel Aviv, Israel
- Bank M, Dar es Salaam, Tanzania
- Bank Mandiri, Jakarta, Indonesia
- Bank Maskan, Tehran, Iran
- Bank Massad, Tel Aviv, Israel
- Bank Mellat, Tehran, Iran
- Bank Melli Iran, Tehran, Iran
- Bank Mendes Gans, Amsterdam, Netherlands
- Bank Millennium, Warsaw, Poland
- Bank Mizrahi-Tefahot, Ramat Gan, Israel
- Bank Muamalat Indonesia, Jakarta, Indonesia
- Bank Muamalat Malaysia, Kuala Lumpur, Malaysia
- Bank Muscat, Muscat, Oman
- Bank Nederlandse Gemeenten, The Hague, Netherlands
- Bank Negara Indonesia, Jakarta, Indonesia
- Bank Norwegian, Fornebu, Norway
- Bank OCBC NISP, Jakarta, Indonesia
- Bank Ochrony Srodowiska, Warsaw, Poland
- Bank of Africa Group, Bamako, Mali
- Bank of Africa Kenya Limited, Nairobi, Kenya
- Bank of Africa Uganda Limited, Kampala, Uganda
- Bank of Africa (Red Sea), Djibouti (City), Djibouti
- Bank of Aland, Mariehamn, Finland
- Bank of Albania, Tirana, Albania
- Bank of Algeria, Algiers, Algeria
- Bank of America, Charlotte, United States
- Bank of Ayudhya, Bangkok, Thailand
- Bank of Azad Jammu & Kashmir, Muzaffarabad, Azad Kashmir
- Bank of Baghdad, Baghdad, Iraq
- Bank of Bahrain and Kuwait (BBK), Manama, Bahrain
- Bank of Baroda, Mumbai, India
- Bank of Baroda Uganda Limited, Kampala, Uganda
- Bank of Beijing, Beijing, China
- Bank of Beirut, Beirut, Lebanon
- Bank of Baroda, Gujarat, India
- Bank of Botswana, Gaborone, Botswana
- Bank of Cape Verde, Praia, Cap Verde
- Bank of Central African States, Yaoundé, Cameroon
- Bank of Ceylon, Colombo, Sri Lanka
- Bank of China, Beijing, China
- Bank of China Hong Kong, Hong Kong, Hong Kong
- Bank of China (Canada), Ontario, Canada
- Bank of Commerce, Makati City, Philippines
- Bank of Communications, Shanghai, China
- Bank of Cyprus, Nicosia, Cyprus
- Bank of Dalian, Dalian, China
- Bank of Finland, Helsinki, Finland
- Bank of France, Paris, France
- Bank of Georgia, Tbilisi, Georgia
- Bank of Ghana, Accra, Ghana
- Bank of Greenland, Aabenraa, Denmark
- Bank of Hawaii Corporation, Honolulu, United States
- Bank of India, Mumbai, India
- Bank of Industry and Mine, Tehran, Iran
- Bank of Italy, Rome, Italy
- Bank of Ireland, Dublin, Ireland
- Bank of Iwate, Morioka, Japan
- Bank of Jerusalem, Jerusalem, Israel
- Bank of Jilin, Changchun, China
- Bank of Jordan, Amman, Jordan
- Bank of Kaohsiung, Kaohsiung, Taiwan
- Bank of Khartoum, Khartoum, Sudan
- Bank of Kigali, Kigali, Rwanda
- Bank of Korea, Jung District, Seoul
- Bank of Kyoto, Kyoto, Japan
- Bank of Latvia, Riga, Latvia
- Bank of Lithuania, Vilnius, Lithuania
- Bank of London and The Middle East, London, United Kingdom
- Bank of Maldives, Male, Maldives
- Bank of Melbourne (1989), Melbourne, Australia
- Bank of Melbourne (2011), Melbourne, Australia
- Bank of Mexico, Mexico City, Mexico
- Bank of Mongolia, Ulaanbaatar, Mongolia
- Bank of Montreal, Montreal, Canada
- Bank of Montserrat, Brades, Montserrat
- Bank of Moscow, Moscow, Russia
- Bank of Mozambique, Maputo, Mozambique
- Bank of Namibia, Namibia
- Bank of New Zealand, Auckland, New Zealand
- Bank of Ningbo, Ningbo, China
- Bank of Papua New Guinea, Port Moresby, Papua New Guinea
- Bank of Punjab, Lahore, Pakistan
- Bank of Qingdao, Qingdao, China
- Bank of Queensland, Brisbane, Australia
- Bank of Shanghai, Shanghai, China
- Bank of Sierra Leone, Freetown, Sierra Leone
- Bank of Slovenia, Ljubljana, Slovenia
- Bank of South Pacific, Port Moresby, Papua New Guinea
- Bank of South Sudan, Juba, South Sudan
- Bank of Spain, Madrid, Spain
- Bank of St Lucia, Castries, St Lucia
- Bank of Syria and Overseas, Damascus, Syria
- Bank of Taiwan, Taipei, Taiwan
- Bank of Taizhou, Taizhou, China
- Bank of Tanzania, Dar es Salaam, Tanzania
- Bank of the City of Buenos Aires, Buenos Aires, Argentina
- Bank of the Nation (Peru), Lima, Peru
- Bank of the Orient, California, United States
- Bank of the Ozarks, Little Rock, United States
- Bank of the Philippine Islands, Makati City, Philippines
- Bank of the Province of Buenos Aires, Buenos Aires, Argentina
- Bank of the Republic of Haiti, Port-au-Prince, Haiti
- Bank of the Ryukyus, Naha, Japan
- Bank of the West, San Francisco, California
- Bank of Tianjin, Tianjin, China
- Bank of Tokyo Mitsubishi, Tokyo, Japan
- Bank of Uganda, Kampala, Uganda
- Bank of Valletta, Valletta, Malta
- Bank of Yokohama, Yokohama, Japan
- Bank of Zambia, Lusaka, Zambia
- Bank One Mauritius, Port Louis, Mauritius
- Bank Otsar Ha-Hayal, Israel
- Bank Pasargad, Tehran, Iran
- Bank Pekao, Warsaw, Poland
- Bank Permata, Jakarta, Indonesia
- Bank Pocztowy, Bydgoszcz, Poland
- Bank Polska Kasa Opieki, Warsaw, Poland
- Bank Pundi Indonesia, Jakarta, Indonesia
- Bank Rakyat Indonesia, Jakarta, Indonesia
- Bank Refah, Tehran, Iran
- Bank Respublika, Baku, Azerbaijan
- Bank Rossiya, St Petersburg, Russia
- Bank Saderat Iran (BSI), Tehran, Iran
- Bank Saint Petersburg, St Petersburg, Russia
- Bank Sepah, Tehran, Iran
- Bank Simpanan Nasional, Kuala Lumpur, Malaysia
- Bank SinoPac, Taipei, Taiwan
- Bank South Pacific, Port Moresby, Papua New Guinea
- Bank Sparhafen Zürich, Zürich, Switzerland
- Bank Spółdzielczy w Brodnicy, Brodnica, Poland
- Bank Stern, Paris, France
- Bank Tabungan Negara (BTN), Jakarta, Indonesia
- Bank Tejarat, Tehran, Iran
- Bank Ten Cate & Cie, Amsterdam, Netherlands
- BankVic, Melbourne, Australia
- Bankwest, Perth, Western Australia
- Bank Windhoek, Windhoek, Namibia
- Bank Zachodni WBK, Wroclaw, Poland
- Banka Kombetare Tregtare, Tirana, Albania
- BankAtlantic Bancorp, Fort Lauderdale, United States
- Bankhaus Bauer, Stuttgart, Germany
- Bankhaus Lampe, Bielefeld, Germany
- Bankhaus Reuschel & Co., Munich, Germany
- Bankia, Madrid, Spain
- Bankinter, Madrid, Spain
- Bankmecu, Kew, Australia
- BankMuscat (SAOG), Muscat, Oman
- BankNordik, Tórshavn, Faroe Islands
- Bankoa, San Sebastian, Spain
- BankSA, Adelaide, South Australia
- BankUnited, Miami Lakes, United States
- Bankwest, Perth, Australia
- Banque Bemo Saudi Fransi, Damascus, Syria
- Banque Cantonale de Fribourg, Fribourg, Switzerland
- Banque Cantonale de Geneve, Geneva, Switzerland
- Banque Cantonale du Valais, Sion, Switzerland
- Banque Cantonale Neuchateloise, Neuchâtel, Switzerland
- Banque Cantonale Vaudoise, Lausanne, Switzerland
- Banque Commerciale du Congo, Kinshasa, DRC Congo
- Banque du Développement du Mali, Bamako, Mali
- Banque de Luxembourg, Luxembourg, Luxembourg
- Banque de l'Habitat, Tunis, Tunisia
- Banque de l'Habitat du Mali, Bamako, Mali
- Banque du Liban, Beirut, Lebanon
- Banque de l'Union Haitienne, Port-au-Prince, Haiti
- Banque de Tunisie, Tunis, Tunisia
- Banque de Tunisie et des Emirats, Tunis, Tunisia
- Banque du Caire, Cairo, Egypt
- Banque et Caisse d'Épargne de l'État, Luxembourg City, Luxembourg
- Banque Francaise Commerciale Ocean Indien, Paris, France
- Banque Internationale a Luxembourg, Luxembourg, Luxembourg
- Banque Internationale Arabe de Tunisie, Tunis, Tunisia
- Banque Internationale du Benin (BIBE), Cotonou, Benin
- Banque Internationale pour la Centrafrique, Bangui, Central African Republic
- Banque Libano-Française S.A.L., Beirut, Lebanon
- Banque Misr, Cairo, Egypt
- Banque Nagelmackers, Brussels, Belgium
- Banque Nationale Agricole, Tunis, Tunisia
- Banque Nationale de Développement Agricole, Bamako, Mali
- Banque Pharaon & Chiha, Lebanon
- Banque pour le Commerce et l'Industrie – Mer Rouge, Djibouti (City), Djibouti
- Banque Populaire du Rwanda, Kigali, Rwanda
- Banque Populaire Maroco Centrafricaine, Bangui, Central African Republic
- Banque Raiffeisen, Luxembourg, Luxembourg
- Banque Sahélo-Saharienne pour l'Investissement et le Commerce, Tripoli, Libya
- Banque Saudi Fransi, Riyadh, Saudi Arabia
- Banque Transatlantique, Paris, France
- Banque Zitouna, Tunis, Tunisia
- BanRegio, Monterrey, Mexico
- Banrisul, Porto Alegre, Brazil
- Bansi, Guadalajara, Mexico
- Banobras, Mexico City, Mexico
- Banorte, Monterrey, Mexico
- Barclays, London, United Kingdom
- Barclays Africa Group, Johannesburg, South Africa
- Barclays Bank Mauritius, Ebene, Mauritius
- Barclays Bank of Kenya, Nairobi, Kenya
- Barclays Bank of Uganda, Kampala, Uganda
- Barclays Bank Tanzania, Dar es Salaam, Tanzania
- Basellandschaftliche Kantonalbank, Liestal, Switzerland
- Basrah International Bank for Investment, Baghdad, Iraq
- BASIC Bank Limited, Dhaka, Bangladesh
- Basler Kantonalbank, Basel, Switzerland
- Bausparkasse Schwäbisch Hall, Schwäbisch Hall, Germany
- BAWAG P.S.K., Vienna, Austria
- Bayerische Landesbank, München, Germany
- Bayerische Landesbank, Munich, Germany
- BayernLB, Munich, Germany
- Baylake Corp, Sturgeon Bay, United States
- BBBank, Karlsruhe, Germany
- BBCN Bancorp, Los Angeles, United States
- BBVA Argentina, Buenos Aires, Argentina
- BBVA Chile, Santiago, Chile
- BBVA Compass, Alabama, USA
- BBVA México, Mexico City, Mexico
- BBVA Perú, Lima, Peru
- BBVA Provincial, Caracas, Venezuela
- BCR Chișinău, Chisinau, Republic of Moldova
- BDO Unibank, Makati City, Philippines
- Belarusbank, Minsk, Belarus
- Belfius, Brussels, Belgium
- Bendigo Bank, Bendigo, Australia
- Beobank, Brussel, Belgium
- Bereke Bank, Almaty, Kazakhstan
- Berenberg Bank, Hamburg, Germany
- Berlin Hyp, Berlin, Germany
- Berliner Sparkasse, Berlin, Germany
- Bermuda Commercial Bank, Hamilton, Bermuda
- Bermuda Monetary Authority, Hamilton, Bermuda
- Berner Kantonalbank, Berne, Switzerland
- Bethmann Bank, Frankfurt am Main, Germany
- Beyond Bank Australia, Adelaide, South Australia
- BGFIBank Group, Libreville, Gabon
- BGL BNP Paribas, Luxembourg, Luxembourg
- BHF Bank, Frankfurt am Main, Germany
- Bhutan National Bank, Thimphu, Bhutan
- Bidvest Bank, Johannesburg, South Africa
- Bilbao Bizkaia Kutxa, Bilbao, Spain
- BIMB Holdings, Kuala Lumpur, Malaysia
- BinckBank, Amsterdam, Netherlands
- Birleşik Fon Bankası, Istanbul, Turkey
- BLOM Bank, Beirut, Lebanon
- Birleşik Fon Bankası, Istanbul, Turkey
- BLC bank, Beirut, Lebanon
- BMCI, Casablanca, Morocco
- BMO Harris Bank, Chicago, United States
- BMW Bank, Munich, Germany
- BNC Bancorp, Thomasville, United States
- BNP Paribas, Paris, France
- BNP Paribas CIB, Paris, France
- BNP Paribas Fortis, Brussels, Belgium
- BNP Paribas Investment Partners, Paris, France
- BNY, New York, United States
- BOK Financial Corporation, Tulsa, United States
- Bolig- og Næringsbanken, Trondheim, Norway
- Botswana Savings Bank, Gaborone, Botswana
- Boubyan Bank, Safat, Kuwait
- BPCE, Paris, France
- BPER Banca, Modena, Italy
- BRAC Bank Limited, Dhaka, Bangladesh
- Bradford & Bingley, Bingley, United Kingdom
- Brazilian Development Bank, Rio de Janeiro, Brazil
- BRD – Groupe Société Générale, Bucharest, Romania
- Bremer Bank (German bank), Bremen, Germany
- British Arab Commercial Bank, London, United Kingdom
- Brown Shipley, London, United Kingdom
- Banca della Svizzera Italiana, Lugano, Switzerland
- BTA Bank, Almaty, Kazakhstan
- BTA Bank, Tbilisi, Georgia
- BTG Pactual, Rio de Janeiro, Brazil
- Budapest Bank, Budapest, Hungary
- Buffalo Commercial Bank, Juba, South Sudan
- Bulgarian Development Bank, Sofia, Bulgaria
- Burgan Bank, Sharq, Kuwait
- Burj Bank, Karachi, Pakistan
- Busan Bank, Busan, South
- Butterfield Bank, Hamilton, Bermuda
- Byblos Bank, Beirut, Lebanon
- Byline Bank, Chicago, United States

== C ==
- C. Hoare & Co, London, United Kingdom
- Cairo Amman Bank, Amman, Jordan
- Caisse des dépôts et consignations, Paris, France
- Caixa Económica de Cabo Verde, Praia, Cape Verde
- Caixa Econômica Federal, Rio de Janeiro, Brazil
- Caixa Geral de Depósitos, Lisbon, Portugal
- Caixabank, Barcelona, Spain
- Caixa Rural Galega, Lugo, Spain
- Caja de Ahorros, Panama City, Panama
- Caja de Ahorros y Monte de Piedad de Madrid, Madrid, Spain
- Caja de Ahorros y Monte de Piedad de Navarra, Pamplona, Spain
- Caja General de Ahorros de Canarias, Santa Cruz de Tenerife, Spain
- Caja Murcia, Murcia, Spain
- CajaSur, Cordoba, Spain
- CAL Bank, Accra, Ghana
- California First National Bancorp, Irvine, United States
- Cambodia Asia Bank, Phnom Penh, Cambodia
- Cambodia Commercial Bank, Phnom Penh, Cambodia
- Cambodian Public Bank, Phnom Penh, Cambodia
- Camco Financial Corporation, Cambridge, United States
- Canadia Bank, Phnom Penh, Cambodia
- Canadian Imperial Bank of Commerce, Toronto, Canada
- Canadian Western Bank, Edmonton, Canada
- Canara Bank, Bangalore, India
- Capital Bank (Botswana), Gaborone, Botswana
- Capital Bank (Haiti), Pétion-Ville, Haiti
- Capital Bank of Jordan, Amman, Jordan
- Capital G Bank, Hamilton, Bermuda
- Capital One Bank, Glen Allen, United States
- Capital One Financial Corporation, McLean, United States
- Cardinal Financial Corporation, McLean, United States
- Cargills Bank, Colombo, Sri Lanka
- Carispezia, La Spezia, Italy
- Cascade Bancorp, Bend, United States
- Cassa dei Risparmi di Forlì e della Romagna, Forlì, Italy
- Cassa Depositi e Prestiti, Rome, Italy
- Cassa di Risparmio del Friuli Venezia Giulia, Gorizia, Italy
- Cassa di Risparmio della Provincia di Chieti, Chieti, Italy
- Cassa di Risparmio della Provincia di Viterbo, Viterbo, Italy
- Cassa di Risparmio di Alessandria, Alessandria, Italy
- Cassa di Risparmio di Asti, Asti, Italy
- Cassa di Risparmio di Biella e Vercelli, Biella, Italy
- Cassa di Risparmio di Bolzano-Sudtiroler Sparkasse, Bolzano, Italy
- Cassa di Risparmio di Bra, Bra, Italy
- Cassa di Risparmio di Cento, Cento, Italy
- Cassa di Risparmio di Cesena, Cesena, Italy
- Cassa di Risparmio di Fermo, Fermo, Italy
- Cassa di Risparmio di Ferrara, Ferrara, Italy
- Cassa di Risparmio di Fossano, Fossano, Italy
- Cassa di Risparmio di Genova e Imperia, Genova, Italy
- Cassa di Risparmio di Orvieto, Orvieto, Italy
- Cassa di Risparmio di Pistoia e Pescia, Pistoia, Italy
- Cassa di Risparmio di Ravenna, Ravenna, Italy
- Cassa di Risparmio di Rimini (CARIM), Rimini, Italy
- Cassa di Risparmio di Saluzzo, Saluzzo, Italy
- Cassa di Risparmio di San Miniato, San Miniato, Italy
- Cassa di Risparmio di Venezia, Venice, Italy
- Cassa di Risparmio di Volterra, Volterra, Italy
- Cassa Padana, Leno, Italy
- Catalunya Banc (CatalunyaCaixa), Barcelona, Spain
- Cater Allen, London, England
- Cathay Bank, Los Angeles, United States
- Cathedral Investment Bank, Dominica, Western Antilles
- Cathay General Bancorp, Los Angeles, United States
- Cathay United Bank, Taipei, Taiwan
- Catholic Syrian Bank, Thrissur, India
- Cavmont Bank, Lusaka, Zambia
- CCB Brasil, São Paulo, Brazil
- CDH Investment Bank, Blantyre, Malawi
- CEC Bank, Bucharest, Romania
- Centenary Bank, Kampala, Uganda
- Centennial Bank, Conway, Arkansas, United States
- Central Bank, Provo, Utah, United States
- Central Bank of Argentina, Buenos Aires, Argentina
- Central Bank of Azerbaijan, Baku, Azerbaijan
- Central Bank of Bahrain, Manama, Bahrain
- Central Bank of Barbados, Bridgetown, Saint Michael
- Central Bank of Bolivia, La Paz, Bolivia
- Central Bank of Bosnia and Herzegovina, Sarajevo, Bosnia and Herzegovina
- Central Bank of Brazil, Brasilia, Brazil
- Central Bank of Chile, Santiago, Chile
- Central Bank of Costa Rica, San José, Costa Rica
- Central Bank of Cyprus, Nicosia, Cyprus
- Central Bank of Djibouti, Djibouti (City), Djibouti
- Central Bank of Egypt, Cairo, Egypt
- Central Bank of Eswatini, Mbabane, Eswatini
- Central Bank of Iceland, Reykjavik, Iceland
- Central Bank of India, Mumbai, India
- Central Bank of Iran, Tehran, Iran
- Central Bank of Iraq, Baghdad, Iraq
- Central Bank of Kenya, Nairobi, Kenya
- Central Bank of Kuwait, Kuwait City, Kuwait
- Central Bank of Lesotho, Lesotho, South Africa
- Central Bank of Liberia, Monrovia, Liberia
- Central Bank of Libya, Tripoli, Liberia
- Central Bank of Madagascar, Malagasy, Madagascar
- Central Bank of Malta, Valletta, Malta
- Central Bank of Mauritania, Nouakchott, Mauritania
- Central Bank of Montenegro, Podgorica, Montenegro
- Central Bank of Nicaragua, Managua, Nicaragua
- Central Bank of Nigeria, Abuja, Nigeria
- Central Bank of Paraguay, Asunción, Paraguay
- Central Bank of The Gambia, Banjul, The Gambia
- Central Bank of the Democratic People's Republic of Korea, Pyongyang, North Korea
- Central Bank of the Republic of China (Taiwan), Zhongzheng, Taipei
- Central Bank of the Republic of Turkey, Ankara, Turkey
- Central Bank of the United Arab Emirates, Abu Dhabi, United Arab Emirates
- Central Bank of Tunisia, Tunis, Tunisia
- Central Bank of Turkmenistan, Ashgabat, Turkmenistan
- Central Bank of Samoa, Apia, Samoa
- Central Bank of São Tomé and Príncipe, Sao Tome, Central Africa
- Central Bank of Somalia, Mogadishu, Somalia
- Central Bank of Seychelles, Victoria, Seychelles
- Central Bank of Suriname, Paramaribo, Suriname
- Central Bank of Syria, Damascus, Syria
- Central Bank of the Republic of Guinea, Guinea
- Central Bank of the Turkish Republic of Northern Cyprus, North Nicosia, Northern Cyprus
- Central Bank of Uruguay, Montevideo, Uruguay
- Central Bank of Uzbekistan, Uzbekistan
- Central Bank of Venezuela, Caracas, Venezuela
- Central Bank of West African States, Dakar, Senegal
- Central Bank of Yemen, Aden, Yemen
- Central Cooperative Bank, Sofia, Bulgaria
- Central Pacific Financial Corp., Honolulu, United States
- Central Reserve Bank of Peru, Lima, Peru
- Century Bank Limited, Putalisadak, Kathmandu
- Československá obchodní banka, Prague, Slovakia
- Cetelem, Paris, France
- Cham Bank, Damascus, Syria
- Chang Hwa Bank, Taipei, Taiwan
- Chase Bank, New York, United States
- Chase Bank Kenya Limited, Nairobi, Kenya
- Chase UK, London, United Kingdom
- ChiantiBanca, Monteriggioni, Italy
- Chiba Bank, Chiba, Japan
- China Banking Corporation, Makati City, Philippines
- China Bohai Bank, Tianjin, China
- China Citic Bank, Beijing, China
- China Construction Bank Corporation, Beijing, China
- China Construction Bank (Macau), Macau, China
- China Everbright Bank, Beijing, China
- China Guangfa Bank, Guangzhou, China
- China Merchants Bank, Shenzhen, China
- China Minsheng Bank, Beijing, China
- China Zheshang Bank, Ningbo, China
- Chiyu Banking Corporation, Hong Kong, Hong Kong
- Chong Hing Bank, Hong Kong, Hong Kong
- CIB Bank, Budapest, Hungary
- CIBC Bank USA, Chicago, United States
- CIBC FirstCaribbean International Bank, Warrens, Barbados
- CIMB Group, Kuala Lumpur, Malaysia
- CIMB Niaga, Jakarta, Indonesia
- CIT Group, Livingston, United States
- Citadele Banka, Riga, Latvia
- Citibank Argentina, Buenos Aires, Argentina
- Citibank Australia, Sydney, Australia
- Citibank Bahrain, Manama, Bahrain
- Citibank Canada, Toronto, Canada
- Citibank (China), Shanghai, China
- Citibank Ecuador, Guayaquil, Ecuador
- Citibank Europe, Dublin, Ireland
- Citibank (Hong Kong), Hong Kong, China
- Citibank India, Mumbai, India
- Citibank Indonesia, Jakarta, Indonesia
- Citibank Korea, Seoul, South Korea
- Citibank Malaysia, Kuala Lumpur, Malaysia
- Citibank Singapore Marina View, Singapore
- Citibank Thailand, Bangkok, Thailand
- Citibank Uganda, Kampala, Uganda
- Citibank United Arab Emirates, Dubai, United Arab Emirates
- Citibank, New York, United States
- CITIC Bank International, Hong Kong, China
- Citigroup, New York, United States
- Citizens Republic Bancorp, Flint, Michigan, United States
- City National Bank (California), Los Angeles, California
- City National Corporation, Beverly Hills, United States
- City Union Bank, Kumbakonam, India
- Civil Bank Limited, Kamaladi, Kathmandu
- Clarien Bank, Hamilton, Bermuda
- Close Brothers Group, London, United Kingdom
- Clydesdale Bank, Glasgow, United Kingdom
- Comdirect, Quickborn, Germany
- Comerica, Dallas, United States
- Commerce Bancshares, Kansas City, United States
- Commercial Bank Centrafrique, Bangui, Central African Republic
- Commercial Bank Group, Douala, Cameroon
- Commercial Bank of Africa, Nairobi, Kenya
- Commercial Bank of Africa (Tanzania), Dar es Salaam, Tanzania
- Commercial Bank of Cameroon, Douala, Cameroon
- Commercial Bank of Ceylon, Colombo, Sri Lanka
- Commercial Bank of Dubai, Dubai, United Arab Emirates
- Commercial Bank of Eritrea, Asmara, Eritrea
- Commercial Bank of Ethiopia, Addis Ababa, Ethiopia
- Commercial Bank of Kuwait, Safat, Kuwait
- Commercial Bank of Syria, Damascus, Syria
- Commerzbank, Frankfurt am Main, Germany
- Commonwealth Bank, Sydney, Australia
- Community Bank Bangladesh Limited, Bangladesh
- Community Bank System, DeWitt, New York, United States
- Community West Bancshares, Goleta, United States
- CommunityOne Bancorp, Asheboro, United States
- Compagnie Financière Edmond de Rothschild, Paris, France
- Compagnie Générale de Banque, Kigali, Rwanda
- Compagnie Monégasque de Banque, Monte Carlo, Monaco
- Compartamos Banco, Mexico City, Mexico
- Consolidated Bank of Kenya, Nairobi, Kenya
- Consorsbank, Nürnberg, Germany
- Consors Finanz, Munich, Germany
- Continental Bank of Canada, Toronto, Canada
- Cooperative Bank, Skopje, Macedonia
- Cooperative Bank, Yangon, Myanmar
- Cooperative Bank, Wellington, New Zealand
- Co-operative Bank of Kenya, Nairobi, Kenya
- Cooperative Bank of Oromia, Addis Ababa, Ethiopia
- Corporate Commercial Bank, Sofia, Bulgaria
- Corporation Bank, Mangalore, India
- Cosmos Bank, Pune, India
- COTA Commercial Bank, Taichung, Taiwan
- Coventry Building Society, Coventry, United Kingdom
- Crane Bank, Kampala, Uganda
- CRDB Bank, Dar es Salaam, Tanzania
- Credins Bank, Tirana, Albania
- Crediop, Rome, Italy
- Credit Agricole, Montrouge, France
- Crédit Agricole Cariparma, Parma, Italy
- Credit Agricole CIB, Paris, France
- Credit Agricole CIB Hungary, Budapest, Hungary
- Credit Agricole CIB Ukraine, Kyiv, Ukraine
- Crédit Agricole Corporate and Investment Bank, Paris, France
- Credit Agricole Egypt, Cairo, Egypt
- Crédit Agricole Italia, Parma, Italy
- Credit Agricole Srbija, Novi Sad, Serbia
- Crèdit Andorrà, Andorra la Vella, Andorra
- Credit Bank, Ulaanbataar, Mongolia
- Credit Bank, Nairobi, Kenya
- Credit Bank of Albania, Tirana, Albania
- Credit Bank of Moscow, Moscow, Russia
- Crédit Industriel et Commercial (CIC), Paris, France
- Crédit du Nord, Paris, France
- Credit Europe Bank, Amsterdam, Netherlands
- Crédit Foncier de France, Charenton, France
- Credit Immobilier et Hotelier (CIH), Casablanca, Morocco
- Credit Industriel et Commercial (CIC), Paris, France
- Credit Lyonnais, Paris, France
- Crédit Mutuel, Paris, France
- Credit Suisse Group, Zurich, Switzerland
- Credito Bergamasco, Bergamo, Italy
- Credito Emiliano, Reggio Emilia, Italy
- Credito Fondiario (Fonspa), Rome, Italy
- Credito Siciliano, Acireale, Italy
- Credito Valtellinese, Sondrio, Italy
- Crelan, Brussels, Belgium
- Croatian National Bank, Zagreb, Croatia
- CS Alterna Bank, Ottawa, Canada
- CSCBank SAL, Beirut, Lebanon
- CTBC Bank, Taipei, Taiwan
- CTBC Bank (Canada), Vancouver, Canada
- CTBC Financial Holding, Taipei, Taiwan
- Cultura Sparebank, Oslo, Norway
- Cyprus Development Bank, Nicosia, Cyprus

== D ==
- Da Afghanistan Bank, Kabul, Afghanistan
- DAB BNP Paribas, Munich, Germany
- Daedong Credit Bank, Pyongyang, North Korea
- Dah Sing Bank, Hong Kong, China
- Danske Bank, Copenhagen, Denmark
- Danske Bank (Norway), Trondheim, Norway
- Danske Bank (Northern Ireland), Belfast, Northern Ireland
- Dar es Salaam Community Bank, Dar es Salaam, Tanzania
- Dar Es Salaam Investment Bank, Baghdad, Iraq
- Davivienda, Bogotá, Colombia
- Daycoval, São Paulo, Brazil
- DBS Bank, Singapore, Singapore
- DBS Bank (Hong Kong), Hong Kong, China
- DCB Bank, Mumbai, India
- Degussa Bank, Frankfurt am Main, Germany
- DekaBank Deutsche Girozentrale, Berlin, Germany
- DekaBank (Germany), Frankfurt am Main, Germany
- Delta Bank, Minsk, Belarus
- Delta Bank, Kyiv, Ukraine
- Dena Bank, Mumbai, India
- De Nederlandsche Bank, Amsterdam, Netherlands
- Denizbank, Istanbul, Turkey
- Denmark Bancshares, Denmark, Wisconsin, United States
- Desjardins Group, Levis, Canada
- De Surinaamsche Bank, Paramaribo, Suriname
- Deutsche Apotheker- und Ärztebank, Düsseldorf, Germany
- Deutsche Bank, Frankfurt am Main, Germany
- Deutsche Bank (Italy), Milano, Italy
- Deutsche Bundesbank, Frankfurt am Main, Germany
- Deutsche Hypothekenbank, Hannover, Germany
- Deutsche Pfandbriefbank, Unterschleißheim, Germany
- Deutsche Postbank, Bonn, Germany
- Deutsche Kreditbank, Berlin, Germany
- Deutsche WertpapierService Bank, Frankfurt am Main, Germany
- Deutsche Zentral-Genossenschaftsbank, Frankfurt am Main, Germany
- Deutscher Sparkassen- und Giroverband, Berlin, Germany
- Development Bank of Ethiopia, Addis Ababa, Ethiopia
- Development Bank of Kenya, Nairobi, Kenya
- Development Bank of the Philippines (DBP), Makati City, Philippines
- Development Bank of Vojvodina, Novi Sad, Serbia
- Development Credit Bank, Mumbai, India
- Development Finance Corporation Belize, Belmopan, Belize
- De Volksbank, Utrecht, Netherlands
- Dexia, Brussels, Belgium
- DFCC Bank, Colombo, Sri Lanka
- DFCU Group, Kampala, Uganda
- DGB Financial Group, Daegu, South Korea
- Dhaka Bank, Dhaka, Bangladesh
- Dhaka Bank Limited, Dhaka, Bangladesh
- Dhanalakshmi Bank, Thrissur, India
- Dhanlaxmi Bank, Kerala, India
- DHB Bank, Rotterdam, Netherlands
- Diamond Bank, Lagos, Nigeria
- Diamond Trust Bank Group, Nairobi, Kenya
- Diamond Trust Bank (Tanzania) Limited, Dar es Salaam, Tanzania
- Diamond Trust Bank (Uganda), Kampala, Uganda
- Die Zweite Sparkasse, Vienna, Austria
- Dime Community Bank, Brooklyn, United States
- Direktna Banka, Kragujevac, Serbia
- DNB ASA, Oslo, Norway
- Dnister, Lviv, Ukraine
- doBank, Verona, Italy
- Donner & Reuschel, Hamburg, Germany
- Doral Financial Corporation, San Juan, Puerto Rico
- DSK Bank, Sofia, Bulgaria
- DSK Hyp, Frankfurt, Germany
- Dresdner Bank, Frankfurt, Germany
- Dubai Bank, Dubai, United Arab Emirates
- Dubai Bank Kenya, Nairobi, Kenya
- Dubai Islamic Bank, Dubai, United Arab Emirates
- Dubai Islamic Bank Pakistan, Karachi, Pakistan
- Dutch Bangla Bank, Dhaka, Bangladesh
- Düsseldorfer Hypothekenbank, Düsseldorf, Germany
- DVB Bank, Frankfurt am Main, Germany
- Dyer & Blair Investment Bank, Nairobi, Kenya
- DZ Bank, Frankfurt am Main, Germany

== E ==
- Eagle Bancorp, Bethesda, Maryland, United States
- East West Bancorp, Pasadena, United States
- Eastern Bank Ltd, Dhaka, Bangladesh
- Eastern Bank, Boston, United States
- Eastern Bank Ltd, London, UK
- Eastern Caribbean Central Bank, Basseterre, St. Kitts
- Ecobank Ghana Limited, Accra, Ghana
- Ecobank Kenya, Nairobi, Kenya
- Ecobank Nigeria, Lagos, Nigeria
- Ecobank Rwanda, Kigali, Rwanda
- Ecobank Transnational, Lomé, Togo
- Ecobank Uganda, Kampala, Uganda
- Ecobank Zimbabwe, Harare, Zimbabwe
- Edekabank, Hamburg, Germany
- Educational Services of America, Knoxville, United States
- EFG Group, Geneva, Switzerland
- EFG International, Zurich, Switzerland
- Egg, London, United Kingdom
- Emigrant Savings Bank, New York, United States
- Emirates Islamic Bank, Dubai, United Arab Emirates
- Emirates NBD, Dubai, United Arab Emirates
- Emporiki Bank, Athens, Greece
- EN Bank, Tehran, Iran
- EON Bank, Kuala Lumpur, Malaysia
- eQ Bank, Helsinki, Finland
- Equatorial Commercial Bank, Nairobi, Kenya
- Equitas Small Finance Bank, Chennai, India
- Equity Bank Kenya Limited, Nairobi, Kenya
- Equity Bank Uganda Limited, Kampala, Uganda
- Equity Group Holdings Limited, Nairobi, Kenya
- E.SUN Commercial Bank, Taipei, Taiwan
- Etibank, Istanbul, Turkey
- Eritrean Investment and Development Bank, Asmara, Eritrea
- Erste Bank Novi Sad, Novi Sad, Serbia
- Erste Group, Vienna, Austria
- ESAF Small Finance Bank, Mannuthy, Thrissur
- Espírito Santo Financial Group, Luxembourg, Luxembourg
- Euler Hermes, Paris, France
- Eurasian Bank, Almaty, Kazakhstan
- Euro Bank, Wroclaw, Poland
- Eurobank a.d., Belgrade, Serbia
- Eurobank Bulgaria (Postbank), Sofia, Bulgaria
- Eurobank Ergasias, Athens, Greece
- Eurocity Bank, Frankfurt, Germany
- Eurohypo, Frankfurt, Germany
- EverBank, Jacksonville, Florida, United States
- Everest Bank, Kathmandu, Nepal
- EVO Banco, Madrid, Spain
- Evocabank, Yerevan, Armenia
- Evrofinance Mosnarbank, Moscow, Russia
- Exchange Bank of Canada, Toronto, Canada
- Exim Bank (Bangladesh), Dhaka, Bangladesh
- Exim Bank (Tanzania), Dar es Salaam, Tanzania
- Exim Bank (Uganda), Kampala, Uganda
- Export Development Bank of Iran, Tehran, Iran
- Export–Import Bank of Romania, Bucharest, Romania
- Export–Import Bank of Korea, Seoul, South Korea
- Export-Import Bank of Thailand, Bangkok, Thailand
- Export-Import Bank of the Republic of China, Taipei, Taiwan
- Export–Import Bank of the United States, Washington, D.C., United States
- Express Bank, Baku, Azerbaijan

== F ==
- F.N.B. Corp, Hermitage, United States
- Faisal Islamic Bank of Egypt, Giza, Egypt
- Faisal Islamic Bank of Sudan, Khartoum, Sudan
- Family Bank, Nairobi, Kenya
- Far Eastern Bank, Singapore, Singapore
- Faysal Bank, Karachi, Pakistan
- FCA Bank, Turin, Italy
- FDH Bank, Blantyre, Madagascar
- Federal Bank, Alwaye, India
- Federal Bank of the Middle East, Dar es Salaam, Tanzania
- FFA Private Bank, Beirut, Lebanon
- FHB Mortgage Bank, Budapest, Hungary
- Fibabanka, Istanbul, Turkey
- Fidelity Bank Ghana, Accra, Ghana
- Fidelity Bank Nigeria, Lagos State, Nigeria
- Fidelity Southern Corporation, Atlanta, United States
- Fidi Toscana, Florence, Italy
- Fidobank, Kyiv, Ukraine
- Fifth Third Bancorp, Cincinnati, United States
- FIH Erhvervsbank, Copenhagen, Denmark
- Financial Bank Benin, Cotonou, Benin
- Five Star Bank (New York), Warsaw, New York, United States
- Finansbank, Istanbul, Turkey
- Finco Services Inc, United States
- FINECO, Brescia, Italy
- First Abu Dhabi Bank, Abu Dhabi, United Arab Emirates
- First Alliance Bank Zambia Limited, Lusaka, Zambia
- First American International Bank, Brooklyn, United States
- First Bancorp, Damariscotta, United States
- First BanCorp, San Juan, Puerto Rico
- First Bancorp, Troy, North Carolina, United States
- First Bancorp, Lebanon, Virginia, United States
- First Bank of Nigeria, Lagos, Nigeria
- First Busey Corporation, Champaign, United States
- First Business Bank (FBB), Athens, Greece
- First Citizens BancShares, Dyersburg, United States
- First Citizens BancShares, Raleigh, United States
- First Citizens Bank, Port of Spain, Trinidad and Tobago
- First City Monument Bank, Lagos, Nigeria
- First Community Bank, Nairobi, Kenya
- First Community Bancshares, Killeen, Texas, United States
- First Community Bancshares, Bluefield, United States
- First Financial Bancorp, Cincinnati, United States
- First Guaranty Bancshares, Hammond, United States
- First Gulf Bank, Abu Dhabi, United Arab Emirates
- First Horizon National Corporation, Memphis, United States
- First International Bank of Israel (FIBI), Tel Aviv, Israel
- First Interstate BancSystem, Billings, United States
- First Investment Bank, Sofia, Bulgaria
- First Investment Bank (PJSC), Kyiv, Ukraine
- First Merchant Bank, Blantyre, Malawi
- First Merchants Corporation, Muncie, United States
- First Midwest Bancorp, Itasca, United States
- First MicroFinance Bank (Afghanistan), Afghanistan
- First MicroFinance Bank (Tajikistan), Tajikistan
- First National Bank of Botswana, Gaborone, Botswana
- First National Bank of Omaha, New York, United States
- First Nations Bank of Canada, Saskatoon, Canada
- First National Bank of Omaha, Omaha, United States
- First International Bank (Liberia), Monrovia, Liberia
- First National Bank (South Africa), Botswana, South Africa
- First Niagara Financial Group, Buffalo, United States
- First Security Islami Bank Limited, Dhaka, Bangladesh
- First Somali Bank, Mogadishu, Somalia
- First Ukrainian International Bank, Kyiv, Ukraine
- First Westroads Bank, Omaha, United States
- First Women Bank Limited, Karachi, Pakistan
- FirstCaribbean International Bank, St Michael, Barbados
- FirstMerit Corporation, Akron, United States
- FirstRand, Sandton, South Africa
- Fondo Común, Caracas, Venezuela
- Foreign Trade Bank of the Democratic People's Republic of Korea, Pyongyang, North Korea
- Forex Bank, Stockholm, Sweden
- Fonkoze, Port-au-Prince, Haiti
- Frankfurter Volksbank, Frankfurt, Germany
- Fransabank, Beirut, Lebanon
- François Desjardins, Montreal, Canada
- Fubon Bank (Hong Kong), Hong Kong, China
- Fubon Financial Holding Co., Taipei, Taiwan
- Fukuoka Financial Group, Fukuoka, Japan
- Fulton Financial Corp, Lancaster, United States
- Future Bank, Manama, Bahrain
- Fürst Fugger Privatbank, Augsburg, Germany
- Fürstlich Castell'sche Bank, Würzburg, Germany

== G ==
- Garanti Bank, Levent, Turkey
- Garanti BBVA, Istanbul, Turkey
- Gazprombank, Moscow, Russia
- GCB Bank, Accra, Ghana
- GEFA Bank, Wuppertal, Germany
- Geniki Bank, Athens, Greece
- Getin Bank, Warsaw, Poland
- Getin Noble Bank, Warsaw, Poland
- GFH Financial Group, Manama, Bahrain
- Ghana Commercial Bank, Accra, Ghana
- Ghavamin Bank, Tehran, Iran
- Giro Commercial Bank, Nairobi, Kenya
- Girobank, Willemstad, Netherlands Antilles
- Glacier Bancorp, Kalispell, United States
- Glarner Kantonalbank, Glarus, Switzerland
- GLS Bank, Bochum, Germany
- Global Bank Liberia, Monrovia, Liberia
- Global Commerce Bank, Georgia, United States
- Golden Bank, Housten, United States
- Golomt Bank, Ulaanbataar, Mongolia
- Government Savings Bank, Bangkok, Thailand
- Graubundner Kantonalbank, Chur, Switzerland
- Grameen Bank, Dhaka, Bangladesh
- Greater Bank, Hamilton, Australia
- Grong Sparebank, Grong, Norway
- Groupe Banque Populaire, Paris, France
- Groupe BPCE, Paris, France
- Groupe Caisse d'Epargne, Paris, France
- Grupo Financiero Banamex, Mexico City, Mexico
- Grupo Financiero Banorte, Mexico City, Mexico
- Grupo Financiero BBVA Bancomer, Mexico City, Mexico
- Grupo Financiero Galicia, Buenos Aires, Argentina
- Grupo Financiero Santander México, Mexico City, Mexico
- Guaranty Trust Bank, Lagos, Nigeria
- Guaranty Trust Bank (Kenya), Nairobi, Kenya
- Guaranty Trust Bank (Rwanda), Kigali, Rwanda
- Guaranty Trust Bank (Uganda), Kampala, Uganda
- Guardian Bank, Nairobi, Kenya
- Gulf African Bank, Nairobi, Kenya
- Gulf Bank of Kuwait, Kuwait City, Kuwait
- Gulf Commercial Bank, Baghdad, Iraq
- Gulf International Bank, Manama, Bahrain

== H ==
- Habib Bank AG Zurich, Zurich, Switzerland
- Habib Metropolitan Bank, Karachi, Pakistan
- HabibMetro, Karachi, Pakistan
- Halk Bank, Ashgabat, Turkmenistan
- Halkbank a.d., Belgrade, Serbia
- Halkbank, Ankara, Turkey
- Halyk Bank, Almaty, Kazakhstan
- Hamburger Sparkasse, Hamburg, Germany
- Hana Financial Group, Seoul, South Korea
- Hang Seng Bank, Hong Kong, Hong Kong
- Hanseatic Bank, Hamburg, Germany
- Harbin Bank, Harbin, China
- Hatton National Bank, Colombo, Sri Lanka
- Hauck & Aufhäuser, Frankfurt, Germany
- HBL Pakistan, Habib Bank Limited Karachi, Pakistan
- HBOS, Edinburgh, United Kingdom
- HBZ Bank, Durban, South Africa
- HDFC Bank, Mumbai, India
- Helaba, Frankfurt am Main, Germany
- Helgeland Sparebank, Mosjøen, Norway
- Hellenic Bank, Strovolos, Cyprus
- Hello bank!, Paris, France
- Heritage Bank, Queensland, Australia
- Himalayan Bank, Kathmandu, Nepal
- Hoerner Bank, Heilbronn, Germany
- Høland og Setskog Sparebank, Bjørkelangen, Norway
- Hokkaido Bank, Sapporo, Japan
- Hokkoku Bank, Kanazawa, Japan
- Hokuriku Bank, Toyama, Japan
- Hokuto Bank, Akita, Japan
- Home Bancshares, Conway, United States
- Home Credit and Finance Bank, Moscow, Russia
- Home Credit & Finance Bank, Moscow, Russia
- Home Credit Bank Belarus, Minsk, Belarus
- Home Credit Bank Kazakhstan, Almaty, Kazakhstan
- Home Credit Czech Republic, Brno, Czech Republic
- Home Credit Slovakia, Piestany, Slovakia
- Hong Leong Bank, Kuala Lumpur, Malaysia
- Horizon Bancorp, Michigan City, United States
- Housing Finance Company of Kenya, Nairobi, Kenya
- Housing Financing Fund, Reykjavik, Iceland
- Hrvatska poštanska banka, Zagreb, Croatia
- HSBC, London, England
- HSBC Bank, London, England
- HSBC Bank Argentina, Buenos Aires, Argentina
- HSBC Bank Australia, Sydney, Australia
- HSBC Bank Bermuda, Hamilton, Bermuda
- HSBC Bank Canada, Vancouver, Canada
- HSBC Bank (Chile), Santiago, Chile
- HSBC Bank Egypt, Cairo, Egypt
- HSBC Bank Malaysia, Kuala Lumpur, Malaysia
- HSBC Bank Malta, Valletta, Malta
- HSBC Bank Middle East, Saint Helier, Jersey
- HSBC Bank Polska, Warsaw, Poland
- HSBC Bank (Taiwan), Taipei, Taiwan
- HSBC Bank (Turkey), Istanbul, Turkey
- HSBC Bank USA, New York, United States
- HSBC France, Paris, France
- HSBC Saudi Arabia, Riyadh, Saudi Arabia
- HSBC Sri Lanka, Colombo, Sri Lanka
- HSBC Trinkaus, Düsseldorf, Germany
- HSBC México, Mexico City, Mexico
- HSH Nordbank, Hamburg, Germany
- Hua Xia Bank, Beijing, China
- Hudson City Bancorp, Paramus, United States
- Hume Bank, Albury, Australia
- Hungarian National Bank, Budapest, Hungary
- Huntington Bancshares, Columbus, United States
- Hypo Alpe Adria Bank Beograd, Belgrade, Serbia
- Hypo Alpe Adria Bank Croatia, Zagreb, Croatia
- Hypo Alpe Adria Bank dd Banja Luka, Mostar, Bosnia-Herzegovina
- Hypo Alpe Adria Bank dd Mostar, Mostar, Bosnia-Herzegovina
- Hypo Alpe Adria Bank International, Klagenfurt, Austria
- Hypo Alpe Adria Bank Italy, Unknown, Italy
- Hypo Alpe Adria Bank Montenegro, Podgorica, Montenegro
- Hypo Alpe Adria Bank Slovenia, Ljubljana, Slovenia
- Hypo Noe Landesbank, Sankt Pölten, Austria
- Hypo Real Estate Holding, Munich, Germany
- HypoVereinsbank, Munich, Germany

== I ==
- Ibercaja Banco, Zaragoza, Spain
- ICBC Turkey, Istanbul, Turkey
- ICCREA Holding, Roma, Italy
- ICICI Bank, Mumbai, India
- ICICI Bank Canada, Toronto, Canada
- IDBI, Mumbai, India
- Idea Bank, Warsaw, Poland
- Idea Bank (Romania), Bucharest, Romania
- IDFC First Bank, Mumbai, India
- IFIC Bank, Dhaka, Bangladesh
- IKB Deutsche Industriebank, Düsseldorf, Germany
- İlbank, Ulus, Turkey
- IMB Bank, Wollongong, Australia
- Imexbank, Odesa, Ukraine
- Imperial Bank Limited, Nairobi, Kenya
- Inbursa, Mexico City, Mexico
- Indian Bank, Chennai, India
- Indian Overseas Bank, Chennai, India
- Indre Sogn Sparebank, Årdalstangen, Norway
- Indo-Zambia Bank Limited, Lusaka, Zambia
- IndusInd Bank, Mumbai, India
- Industrial and Commercial Bank of China (Asia), Hong Kong, China
- Industrial and Commercial Bank of China (Macau), Macau, China
- Industrial Bank (China), Fuzhou, China
- Industrial Bank of Iraq, Baghdad, Iraq
- Industrial Bank of Korea, Seoul, South Korea
- Industrial Bank of Kuwait, Safat, Kuwait
- Industrial Bank (Washington D.C.), Washington D.C., United States
- Industrial Development Bank, Karachi, Pakistan
- InecoBank, Yerevan, Armenia
- ING Australia, Sydney, Australia
- ING Bank, Amsterdam, Netherlands
- ING Bank Śląski, Katowice, Poland
- ING Belgium, Brussels, Belgium
- ING DiBa, Frankfurt am Main, Germany
- ING Group, Amsterdam, Netherlands
- ING Vysya Bank, Bangalore, India
- Insinger de Beaufort, Luxembourg, Luxembourg
- Innwa Bank, Yangon, Myanmar
- Istituto per il Credito Sportivo, Rome, Italy
- Inter-American Development Bank, Washington D.C., United States
- Interbank, Kyiv, Ukraine
- Interbank Burundi, Bujumbura, Burundi
- Intercontinental Bank, Lagos, Nigeria
- International Bancshares Corp, Laredo, United States
- International Bank of Azerbaijan (IBA), Baku, Azerbaijan
- International Bank of Azerbaijan-Georgia, Tbilisi, Georgia
- International Bank of Qatar, Doha, Qatar
- Internationales Bankenhaus Bodensee, Friedrichshafen, Germany
- International Investment Bank, Budapest, Hungary
- Intesa Sanpaolo, Torino, Italy
- Intesa Sanpaolo Bank (Albania), Tirana, Albania
- Intesa Sanpaolo Bank Ireland, Dublin, Ireland
- Intesa Sanpaolo Bank Romania, Arad, Romania
- Intesa Sanpaolo Banka Bosnia/Herzegovina, Sarajevo, Bosnia-Herzegovina
- Investcorp, Manama, Bahrain
- Investec Bank, London, United Kingdom
- Investitionsbank Berlin, Berlin, Germany
- Investment Bank of Greece, Athens, Greece
- Investors Bank, New Jersey, United States
- Investrust Bank, Lusaka, Zambia
- Iraqi Islamic Bank, Baghdad, Iraq
- Iranian-European Bank, Hamburg, Germany
- Iran-Venezuela Bi-National Bank, Tehran, Iran
- Isbank, Moscow, Russia
- Islamic Bank of Britain, Birmingham, United Kingdom
- Islamic Cooperation Investment Bank, Tehran, Iran
- Islamic International Arab Bank, Amman, Jordan
- Islandsbanki, Reykjavik, Iceland
- Israel Discount Bank, Tel Aviv, Israel
- Istituto Centrale delle Banche Popolari Italiane, Milano, Italy
- Istrobanka, Bratislava, Slovakia
- İş Yatırım, Istanbul, Turkey
- Itaú Corpbanca, Santiago, Chile
- Itau Unibanco Holding S.A., São Paulo, Brazil
- Ivory Bank, Juba, South Sudan
- IWBank, Milan, Italy
- I&M Bank Limited, Nairobi, Kenya
- I&M Bank Tanzania Limited, Dar es Salaam, Tanzania
- I&M Bank Rwanda Limited, Kigali, Rwanda

== J ==
- Jæren Sparebank, Bryne, Norway
- Jamii Bora Bank, Nairobi, Kenya
- Jammu & Kashmir Bank, Srinagar, India
- Jamuna Bank, Dhaka, Bangladesh
- Janata Bank, Dhaka, Bangladesh
- Janata Bank Nepal Limited, Kathmandu, Nepal
- Japan Post Bank, Tokyo, Japan
- Jefferies Group, New York, United States
- Jio Payments Bank, Mumbai, India
- Johnson Financial Group, Racine, United States
- Joint Stock Commercial Bank for Foreign Trade of Vietnam, Hanoi, Vietnam
- Jordan Ahli Bank, Amman, Jordan
- Jordan Kuwait Bank, Amman, Jordan
- Joyo Bank, Mito, Japan
- JP Morgan Chase & Co, New York, United States
- JS Bank, Karachi, Pakistan
- Jubanka, Belgrade, Serbia
- Jubilee Bank, Dhaka, Bangladesh
- JUBMES banka, Belgrade, Serbia
- Julian Hodge Bank, Cardiff, United Kingdom
- Julius Baer Group, Zurich, Switzerland
- Juniper Advisory, Chicago, United States
- Jyske Bank, Silkeborg, Denmark

== K ==
- Kabul Bank, Kabul, Afghanistan
- Kanbawza Bank, Yangon, Myanmar
- Kanto Tsukuba Bank, Tsuchiura City, Japan
- Kapital Bank, Baku, Azerbaijan
- Karafarin Bank, Tehran, Iran
- Karmasangsthan Bank, Dhaka, Bangladesh
- Karnataka Bank, Mangalore, India
- Karur Vysya Bank, Karur, India
- KASB Bank, Karachi, Pakistan
- Kasikornbank, Bangkok, Thailand
- Kazkommertsbank, Almaty, Kazakhstan
- KB Financial Group Inc, Seoul, South Korea
- KBC Bank, Brussels, Belgium
- KBC Bank Ireland, Dublin, Ireland
- KCB Bank Kenya Limited, Nairobi, Kenya
- KCB Bank Rwanda Limited, Kigali, Rwanda
- KBC Group, Brussels, Belgium
- KCB Bank South Sudan Limited, Juba, South Sudan
- KCB Bank Uganda Limited, Kampala, Uganda
- KD-Bank, Dortmund, Germany
- Kempen & Co, Amsterdam, Netherlands
- Kenya Commercial Bank, Nairobi, Kenya
- KeyBank, Cleveland, United States
- KeyCorp, Cleveland, United States
- Keytrade Bank, Brussels, Belgium
- KfW Bank, Frankfurt, Germany
- KfW IPEX-Bank, Frankfurt, Germany
- KGI Bank, Taipei, Taiwan
- Khaleeji Commercial Bank, Manama, Bahrain
- Khushhali Bank, Islamabad, Pakistan
- Kiatnakin Bank, Bangkok, Thailand
- Kiwibank, Wellington, New Zealand
- Klakki, Reykjavik, Iceland
- Komercni banka, Prague, Czech Republic
- Komercijalna banka, Belgrade, Serbia
- Komercijalna banka Budva, Budva, Serbia
- Komerční banka Bratislava, Bratislava, Slovakia
- Korea Development Bank, Seoul, South Korea
- Korea Exchange Bank, Seoul, South Korea
- Kotak Mahindra Bank, Mumbai, India
- KredoBank, Lviv, Ukraine
- Kreissparkasse Ludwigsburg, Ludwigsburg, Germany
- Krung Thai Bank, Bangkok, Thailand
- Kumari Bank, Kathmandu, Nepal
- Kutxabank, Bilbao, Spain
- Kuwait Finance House, Safat, Kuwait
- Kuwait International Bank, Safat, Kuwait
- K&H Bank, Budapest, Hungary

== L ==
- La Banque Postale, Paris, France
- La Caixa, Valencia, Spain
- Laiki Bank, Thessaloniki, Greece
- Lakshmi Vilas Bank, Karur, India
- Land Bank of Taiwan, Taipei, Taiwan
- Landesbank Baden-Württemberg (LBBW), Stuttgart, Germany
- Landesbank Berlin Holding (LBB), Berlin, Germany
- Landesbank Saar, Saarbrücken, Germany
- Landkreditt Bank, Oslo, Norway
- Landsbankinn, Reykjavik, Iceland
- Landwirtschaftliche Rentenbank, Frankfurt am Main, Germany
- Lansforsakringar Bank, Stockholm, Sweden
- Latvijas Krājbanka, Riga, Latvia
- Laurentian Bank of Canada, Montreal, Canada
- Lauritzen Corporation, Omaha, United States
- Laxmi Bank, Kathmandu, Nepal
- LCL S.A., Lyon, France
- Lebanese Swiss Bank, Beirut, Lebanon
- Leeds Building Society, Leeds, United Kingdom
- Letshego Bank Tanzania, Dar es Salaam, Tanzania
- LGT Group, Vaduz, Liechtenstein
- Liberbank, Madrid, Spain
- Liberty Bank (Georgia), Tbilisi, Georgia
- Libyan Foreign Bank, Tripoli, Libya
- Liechtensteinische Landesbank, Vaduz, Liechtenstein
- Lloyds Banking Group, London, United Kingdom
- Lombard Bank, Valletta, Malta
- London Scottish Bank, Manchester, United Kingdom
- Luminor Bank, Tallinn, Estonia
- Luzerner Kantonalbank, Lucerne, Switzerland

== M ==
- M&T Bank Corporation, Buffalo, United States
- M.M. Warburg & Co., Hamburg, Germany
- Macau Chinese Bank, Macau, Macao
- Mackinac Financial Corporation, Traverse City, United States
- Macquarie Group, Sydney, Australia
- Maduro & Curiel's Bank, Willemstad, Netherlands Antilles
- MagNet Bank, Budapest, Hungary
- Makedonska banka, Skopje, Republic of Macedonia
- Malayan Banking Berhad, Kuala Lumpur, Malaysia
- Manas Bank, Kyrgyzstan
- Manulife Bank of Canada, Waterloo, Canada
- Maple Bank, Frankfurt, Germany
- Mashreqbank, Dubai, United Arab Emirates
- MauBank, Ebene Cybercity, Mauritius
- Mauritius Commercial Bank, Port Louis, Mauritius
- Maybank, Kuala Lumpur, Malaysia
- mBank, Warsaw, Poland
- MBCA Bank, Harare, Zimbabwe
- MCB Bank, Lahore, Pakistan
- MCB Bank Limited, Lahore, Pakistan
- MCB Madagascar, Antananarivo, Madagascar
- MCB Islamic Bank Limited, Lahore, Pakistan
- MDM Bank, Novosibirsk, Russia
- ME Bank, Melbourne, Australia
- Mediobanca, Milano, Italy
- Mediocredito Italiano, Milan, Italy
- Mediterranean Bank, Valletta, Malta
- MeesPierson, Rotterdam, Netherlands
- Meem (bank), Manama, Bahrain
- Meezan Bank, Karachi, Pakistan
- MeDirect Bank Malta, Sliema, Malta
- Mega Bank Nepal Limited, Nepal, India
- Mega International Commercial Bank, Taipei, Taiwan
- Meghna Bank, Dhaka, Bangladesh
- Mekong Housing Bank, Ho Chi Minh City, Vietnam
- Melhus Sparebank, Melhus, Norway
- Mellat Bank, Yerevan, Armenia
- Mellat Investment Bank, Tehran, Iran
- ME Bank, Melbourne, Australia
- Mercantil Servicios Financieros, Caracas, Venezuela
- Mercantile Bank (Bangladesh), Dhaka, Bangladesh
- Mercantile Bank Limited, South Africa, Sandown, Gauteng, South Africa
- Mercantile Discount Bank, Tel Aviv, Israel
- Mercedes-Benz Bank, Stuttgart, Germany
- Merck Finck & Co, Munich, Germany
- Merkur Bank, Munich, Germany
- Metbank, Harare, Zimbabwe
- Metrocorp Bancshares, Houston, United States
- Metzler Bank, Frankfurt, Germany
- Mendelssohn & Co., Berlin, Germany
- MEVAS Bank, Hong Kong, China
- Michinoku Bank, Aomori, Japan
- Middle East Bank (Kenya), Nairobi, Kenya
- MidWestOne Financial Group, Iowa City, United States
- Migros Bank, Zurich, Switzerland
- Millennium BCP, Lisbon, Portugal
- Mir Business Bank, Moscow, Russia
- Mitsubishi UFJ Financial Group, Tokyo, Japan
- Mizuho Corporate Bank, Tokyo, Japan
- Mizuho Financial Group, Tokyo, Japan
- MKB Bank, Budapest, Hungary
- MKB Unionbank, Sofia, Bulgaria
- Modhumoti Bank Limited, Bangladesh
- Moldova Agroindbank, Chisinau, Moldova
- M Oriental Bank, Nairobi, Kenya
- Monetary Authority of Brunei Darussalam, Bandar Seri Begawan, Brunei
- Monet Investment Bank, Ulaanbaatar, Mongolia
- Moody Bancshares, Galveston, United States
- Mora Banc Grup, Andorra la Vella, Andorra
- Morgan Stanley, New York, United States
- MP Bank, Reykjavik, Iceland
- MPS Capital Services, Florence, Italy
- Münchner Bank, Munich, Germany
- Municipal Bank of Rosario, Rosario, Argentina
- MUFG Bank, Tokyo, Japan
- MUFG Union Bank, New York, United States
- Mutiara Bank, Jakarta, Indonesia
- Mutual Trust Bank Limited, Dhaka, Bangladesh
- Myanma Apex Bank, Nay Pyi Taw, Myanmar
- Myanma Economic Bank, Naypyidaw, Myanmar
- Myanma Foreign Trade Bank, Yangon, Myanmar
- Myanma Investment and Commercial Bank, Yangon, Myanmar
- MyState, Hobart, Australia

== N ==
- N26, Berlin, Germany
- Nabil Bank, Kathmandu, Nepal
- Nadra Bank, Kyiv, Ukraine
- Nainital Bank, Nainital, India
- Nanto Bank, Nara, Japan
- Nanyang Commercial Bank, Hong Kong, China
- Nathan Bostock, Maidstone, England
- National Agricultural Cooperative Federation, South Korea
- National Australia Bank, Melbourne, Australia
- National Bank Limited, Dhaka, Bangladesh
- National-Bank, Essen, Germany
- National Bank Limited, Bengali, Bangladesh
- National Bank of Abu Dhabi, Abu Dhabi, United Arab Emirates
- National Bank of Angola, Luanda, Angola
- National Bank of Bahrain, Manama, Bahrain
- National Bank of Belize, Belmopan, Belize
- National Bank of Canada, Montreal, Canada
- National Bank of Commerce (Tanzania), Dar es Salaam, Tanzania
- National Bank of Dominica, Roseau, Dominica
- National Bank of Egypt, Cairo, Egypt
- National Bank of Fujairah, Fujairah, United Arab Emirates
- National Bank of Georgia, Tbilisi, Georgia
- National Bank of Greece, Athens, Greece
- National Bank of Greece, NBG Malta, Sliema, Malta
- National Bank of Kenya, Nairobi, Kenya
- National Bank of Kazakhstan, Almaty, Kazakhstan
- National Bank of Kuwait, Safat, Kuwait
- National Bank of Liechtenstein, Vaduz, Liechtenstein
- National Bank of Malawi, Blantyre, Malawi
- National Bank of Moldova, Chisinau, Moldova
- National Bank of Oman, Ruwi, Oman
- National Bank of Pakistan, Karachi, Pakistan
- National Bank of Rwanda, Kigali, Rwanda
- National Bank of Samoa, Apia, Samoa
- National Bank of Slovakia, Bratislava, Slovakia
- National Bank of Sudan, Khartoum, Sudan
- National Bank of Tajikistan, Dushanbe, Tajikistan
- National Bank of the Republic of Belarus, Minsk, Belarus
- National Bank of the Kyrgyz Republic, Bishkek, Kyrgyz Republic
- National Bank of Ukraine, Kyiv, Ukraine
- National Bank of Uzbekistan, Tashkent, Uzbekistan
- National Bank of Vanuatu, Port Vila, Vanuatu
- National Bank of Yemen, Aden, Yemen
- National Commercial Bank, Al Bayda, Libya
- National Commercial Bank, Jeddah, Saudi Arabia
- National Development Bank, Colombo, Sri Lanka
- National Industrial Credit Bank, Nairobi, Kenya
- National Investment Bank, Accra, Ghana
- National Microfinance Bank, Dar es Salaam, Tanzania
- National Reserve Bank, Moscow, Russia
- National Savings Bank (Sri Lanka), Colombo, Sri Lanka
- Nations Trust Bank, Colombo, Sri Lanka
- Nationwide Building Society, Northampton, United Kingdom
- Natixis, Paris, France
- NatWest, London, United Kingdom
- NBD Bank, Nizhny Novgorod, Russia
- NBS Bank, Blantyre, Malawi
- NBT Bancorp, Norwich, United States
- NCC Bank, Dhaka, Bangladesh
- Nedbank Group, Johannesburg, South Africa
- Nederlandse Waterschapsbank, The Hague, Netherlands
- Nepal Bank, Kathmandu, Nepal
- Nepal Bangladesh Bank, Kathmandu, Nepal
- Nepal Investment Bank, Kathmandu, Nepal
- Nepal Rastra Bank, Kathmandu, Nepal
- Nepal SBI Bank, Kathmandu, Nepal
- Netherlands Development Finance Company, The Hague, Netherlands
- New Bank of Santa Fe, Santa Fe Province, Argentina
- Newcastle Building Society, Newcastle upon Tyne, United Kingdom
- Newcastle Permanent Building Society, Newcastle, Australia
- New York Community Bancorp, Westbury, United States
- New Kabul Bank, Kabul, Afghanistan
- Nexi, Milan, Italy
- NIB Bank, Karachi, Pakistan
- NIBC Bank, The Hague, Netherlands
- NIC Bank Group, Nairobi, Kenya
- NIC Bank Tanzania, Dar es Salaam, Tanzania
- Nicolet Bankshares, Green Bay, United States
- Nile Commercial Bank, Juba, South Sudan
- NLB Group, Ljubljana, Slovenia
- NMB Bank Nepal, Kathmandu, Nepal
- Nomos Bank, Moscow, Russia
- Nomura Holdings, Tokyo, Japan
- Nonghyup Bank, Seoul, South Korea
- Noor Bank, Dubai, United Arab Emirates
- Norddeutsche Landesbank (NORD LB), Hanover, Germany
- Nordea Bank Finland, Helsinki, Finland
- Nordea Bank Norge, Oslo, Norway
- Nordea Bank Polska, Gdynia, Poland
- Nordlandsbanken (NB), Bodø, Norway
- Norges Bank, Oslo, Norway
- Norinchukin Bank, Tokyo, Japan
- Norisbank, Bonn, Germany
- Norne Securities, Oslo, Norway
- North Valley Bancorp, Redding, United States
- Northeast Bancorp, Lewiston, United States
- Northern Trust Corporation, Chicago, United States
- Norvik Banka, Riga, Latvia
- Norwich and Peterborough Building Society, Peterborough, United Kingdom
- Nottingham Building Society, Nottingham, United Kingdom
- Nova Ljubljanska Banka (NLB), Ljubljana, Slovenia
- Novikombank, Moscow, Russia
- Novo Banco, Lisbon, Portugal
- NRB Bank, Dhaka, Bangladesh
- NRW.BANK, Düsseldorf, Germany
- Nuevo Banco de Santa Fe, Santa Fe, Argentina
- Nurol Bank, Maslak, Turkey
- Nykredit, Copenhagen, Denmark

== O ==
- Oberbank, Linz, Austria
- OCBC Wing Hang Bank, Hong Kong, China
- Ocean Bank, Hai Duong, Vietnam
- Ocean Bankshares, Miami, United States
- Oceanic Bank, Abuja, Nigeria
- ODDO BHF, Paris, France
- OFG Bancorp, San Juan, Puerto Rico
- Old National Bancorp, Evansville, United States
- Oldenburgische Landesbank, Oldenburg, Germany
- Oman Arab Bank, Ruwi, Oman
- Omni Bank (California), Alhambra, United States
- One Bank Limited, Dhaka, Bangladesh
- Openbank, Madrid, Spain
- OP Financial Group, Helsinki, Finland
- OP-Pohjola Group, Helsinki, Finland
- Orienbank, Dushanbe, Tajikistan
- Orient Bank, Kampala, Uganda
- Orient Bank, Ho Chi Minh City, Vietnam
- Oriental Bank of Commerce, New Delhi, India
- Oriental Commercial Bank, Nairobi, Kenya
- Oromia International Bank, Addis Ababa, Ethiopia
- Ostsächsische Sparkasse Dresden, Dresden, Germany
- Otkritie Financial Corporation, Moscow, Russia
- Otkritie FC Bank, Moscow, Russia
- OTP Bank, Budapest, Hungary
- Oversea Chinese Banking Corporation (OCBC), Singapore, Singapore

== P ==
- Pacific & Western Bank of Canada, London, Canada
- Pacific Capital Bancorp, Santa Barbara, United States
- Pacific Global Bank, Chicago, United States
- Pacific Mercantile Bancorp, Costa Mesa, United States
- Pacific Premier Bancorp, Irvine, United States
- Pacwest Bancorp, San Diego, United States
- Padma Bank Limited, Dhaka, Bangladesh
- Pan Asia Banking Corporation PLC, Colombo, Sri Lanka
- Paramount Universal Bank, Nairobi, Kenya
- Parsian Bank, Tehran, Iran
- Pashtany Bank, Kabul, Afghanistan
- Patria Bank, Bucharest, Romania
- Pax-Bank, Cologne, Germany
- Peoples Bancorp of North Carolina, Newton, United States
- People's Bank (Sri Lanka), Colombo, Sri Lanka
- People's Bank of Zanzibar, Zanzibar, Tanzania
- People's Savings Bank (Celje), Celje, Slovenia
- Persia International Bank, London, United Kingdom
- Philippine Bank of Communications, Makati City, Philippines
- Philippine National Bank, Pasay, Philippines
- Philippine Veterans Bank, Makati City, Philippines
- Philtrust Bank, Manila, Philippines
- Phnom Penh Commercial Bank, Phnom Penh, Cambodia
- Ping An Bank, Shenzhen, China
- Pinnacle Financial Partners, Nashville, United States
- Piraeus Bank Group, Athens, Greece
- Piraeus Bank Romania, Bucharest, Romania
- PKO Bank Polski, Warsaw, Poland
- PlainsCapital Corporation, Dallas, United States
- P&N Bank, Perth, Australia
- PNB Banka, Riga, Latvia
- PNC Financial Services Group, Pittsburgh, United States
- Polaris Bank Limited, Lagos, Nigeria
- Police Bank, Sydney, Australia
- Popular, Inc., Hato Rey, San Juan, Puerto Rico
- Post Bank (Russia), Moscow, Russia
- Post Bank of Iran, Tehran, Iran
- Postal Savings Bank of China, Beijing, China
- Poste Italiane, Rome, Italy
- Poštová banka, Bratislava, Slovakia
- Prabhu Bank, Kathmandu, Nepal
- Pravex Bank, Kyiv, Ukraine
- Preferred Bank, Los Angeles, United States
- Premier Bank, Dhaka, Bangladesh
- President's Choice Bank, Toronto, Canada
- Prime Bank (Kenya), Nairobi, Kenya
- Prime Bank Limited, Dhaka, Bangladesh
- Prime Commercial Bank, Kathmandu, Nepal
- Primorska banka, Rijeka, Croatia
- Principality Building Society, Cardiff, United Kingdom
- PrivatBank, Riga, Latvia
- PrivatBank, Dnipro, Ukraine
- Privatebancorp, Chicago, United States
- Privredna banka Zagreb, Zagreb, Croatia
- Probank, Athens, Greece
- Probashi Kallyan Bank, Dhaka, Bangladesh
- ProCredit Bank (Romania), Bucharest, Romania
- Prometey Bank, Yerevan, Armenia
- Prominvestbank, Kyiv, Ukraine
- Promsvyazbank, Moscow, Russia
- Prosperity Bancshares, Houston, United States
- Provident Financial Services, Jersey City, United States
- Prva banka Crne Gore, Podgorica, Montenegro
- PSD Bank, Bonn, Germany
- PSD Bank München, Augsburg, Germany
- Pubali Bank, Dhaka, Bangladesh
- Public Bank, Kuala Lumpur, Malaysia
- Public Bank (Hong Kong), Hong Kong, China
- Punjab & Sind Bank, New Delhi, India
- Punjab National Bank, New Delhi, India

== Q ==
- Qarz Al-Hasaneh Mehr Iran Bank, Tehran, Iran
- Qatar Central Bank, Doha, Qatar
- Qatar Development Bank, Doha, Qatar
- Qatar Islamic Bank (QIB), Doha, Qatar
- Qatar National Bank, Doha, Qatar
- QCR Holdings, Moline, United States
- Qudos Bank, Sydney, Australia
- Quontic Bank, New York, United States
- Queensland National Bank, Brisbane, Australia

== R ==
- Rabobank, Utrecht, Netherlands
- Rabobank New Zealand, Wellington, New Zealand
- Rafidain Bank, Baghdad, Iraq
- Raiffeisen (Albania), Albania
- Raiffeisenbank (Bulgaria), Sofia, Bulgaria
- Raiffeisenbank (Russia), Moscow, Russia
- Raiffeisen Bank Aval, Kyiv, Ukraine
- Raiffeisen Bank International, Vienna, Austria
- Raiffeisen Bank (Romania), Bucharest, Romania
- Raiffeisenlandesbank Niederösterreich-Wien, Vienna, Austria
- Raiffeisenlandesbank Oberösterreich, Linz, Austria
- Raiffeisen Landesbank Tirol, Innsbruck, Austria
- Raiffeisen Zentralbank, Vienna, Austria
- Rajshahi Krishi Unnayan Bank, Rajshahi, Bangladesh
- Rakbank, Ras Al-Khaimah, United Arab Emirates
- Rasheed Bank, Baghdad, Iraq
- Rastriya Banijya Bank, Kathmandu, Nepal
- Ratnakar Bank, Kolhapur, India
- Rawbank, Kinshasa, DRC Congo
- Raymond James Financial, St Petersburg, Florida, United States
- RBL Bank, Mumbai, India
- RCI Banque, Paris, France
- Real Bank, Kharkiv, Ukraine
- Real Estate Bank of Iraq, Baghdad, Iraq
- Refah Bank, Tehran, Iran
- Regional Australia Bank, Armidale, Australia
- Regions Financial Corp, Birmingham, United States
- Reisebank, Frankfurt, Germany
- Renaissance Credit, Moscow, Russia
- Renasant Corporation, Tupelo, United States
- Renta 4 Banco, Madrid, Spain
- Republic Bancorp, Louisville, United States
- Republic Bank, Port of Spain, Trinidad and Tobago
- Republic First Bancorp, Philadelphia, United States
- Reserve Bank of Australia, Sydney, Australia
- Reserve Bank of India, Mumbai, India
- Reserve Bank of Malawi, Malawi
- Reserve Bank of Zimbabwe, Harare, Zimbabwe
- Resona Holdings, Osaka, Japan
- Reverta, Riga, Latvia
- RHB Bank Berhad, Kuala Lumpur, Malaysia
- Ridgewood Savings Bank, New York, United States
- Rietumu Banka, Riga, Latvia
- Riyad Bank, Riyadh, Saudi Arabia
- Rodovid Bank, Kyiv, Ukraine
- Rogers Bank, Toronto, Canada
- Rokel Commercial Bank, Freetown, Sierra Leone
- Rosbank, Moscow, Russia
- Rossiya Bank, Saint Petersburg, Russia
- Rossiysky Kredit Bank, Moscow, Russia
- Rothschild & Co, Paris, France
- Rothschild Martin Maurel, Marseille, France
- Royal Bank of Canada, Toronto, Canada
- Royal Bank of Scotland, Edinburgh, United Kingdom
- Royal Bank Zimbabwe, Harare, Zimbabwe
- Royal Business Bank, Los Angeles, United States
- Royal Monetary Authority of Bhutan, Thimphu, Bhutan
- Rupali Bank Limited, Dhaka, Bangladesh
- Russian Agricultural Bank, Moscow, Russia
- Russian National Commercial Bank, Moscow, Russia
- Russian Standard Bank, Moscow, Russia
- Russtroybank, Moscow, Russia
- Rwanda Development Bank, Kigali, Rwanda

== S ==
- Safra National Bank of New York, New York, United States
- Sahara Bank, Tripoli, Liberia
- Sainsbury's Bank, London, United Kingdom
- Saitama Bank, Urawa, Japan
- Salaam Somali Bank, Mogadishu, Somalia
- Sal. Oppenheim, Cologne, Germany
- Saman Bank, Tehran, Iran
- Samba Financial Group, Riyadh, Saudi Arabia
- Sampath Bank, Colombo, Sri Lanka
- Sanasa Development Bank, Kirulapone, Sri Lanka
- Sandnes Sparebank, Sandnes, Norway
- Santander Bank, Massachusetts, USA
- Santander Bank Polska, Wroclaw, Poland
- Santander Brasil, São Paulo, Brazil
- Santander Consumer Bank (Deutschland), Mönchengladbach, Germany
- Santander México, Mexico City, Mexico
- Santander UK, London, United Kingdom
- Saraswat Bank, Mumbai, India
- Sarmayeh Bank, Tehran, Iran
- Sasfin Bank, Waverley, South Africa
- Saudi British Bank, Riyadh, Saudi Arabia
- S-Bank, Helsinki, Finland
- Sberbank of Russia, Moscow, Russia
- Sberbank Europe Group, Vienna, Austria
- SBI Shinsei Bank, Tokyo, Japan
- SBM Bank Kenya Limited, Nairobi, Kenya
- Schroders, London, United Kingdom
- Scotiabank, Toronto, Canada
- SEB Group, Stockholm, Sweden
- Security Bank Corporation, Makati City, Philippines
- Sekerbank, Istanbul, Turkey
- Seven Bank, Tokyo, Japan
- Seylan Bank, Colombo, Sri Lanka
- Shahjalal Islami Bank Limited, Dhaka, Bangladesh
- Shamrao Vithal Co-operative Bank, Mumbai, India
- Shanghai Commercial Bank, Hong Kong, Hong Kong
- Shanghai Commercial and Savings Bank, Taipei, Taiwan
- Shanghai Pudong Development Bank, Shanghai, China
- Sharjah Islamic Bank, Sharjah, United Arab Emirates
- Shawbrook Bank, Manchester, United Kingdom
- Shengjing Bank, Shenyang, China
- Shimanto Bank, Dhaka, Bangladesh
- Shinhan Bank, Seoul, South Korea
- Shinhan Financial Group, Seoul, South Korea
- Shizuoka Bank, Shizuoka, Japan
- Shoko Chukin Bank, Tokyo, Japan
- Shonai Bank, Tsuruoka, Japan
- Siam Commercial Bank, Bangkok, Thailand
- Siddhartha Bank, Kathmandu, Nepal
- Sierra Leone Commercial Bank, Freetown, Sierra Leone
- Signature Bank, New York, United States
- Sidian Bank, Nairobi, Kenya
- Silkbank Limited, Karachi, Pakistan
- Sina Bank, Tehran, Iran
- Sindh Bank, Karachi, Pakistan
- Skipton Building Society, Skipton, United Kingdom
- Skue Sparebank, Nesbyen, Norway
- Skye Bank, Lagos, Nigeria
- Slovenská sporiteľňa, Bratislava, Slovakia
- Slovenska zarucna a rozvojova banka, Bratislava, Slovakia
- Social Islami Bank Limited, Dhaka, Bangladesh
- Société Générale, Paris, France
- Société Marseillaise de Crédit, Marseille, France
- Société Nationale de Crédit et d'Investissement, Luxembourg City, Luxembourg
- Societe Tunisienne de Banque, Tunis, Tunisia
- Sofitasa, San Cristobal, Venezuela
- Sogebank, Port-au-Prince, Haiti
- Sonali Bank, Dhaka, Bangladesh
- Soneri Bank, Lahore, Pakistan
- South African Reserve Bank, Pretoria, South Africa
- South Bangla Agriculture and Commerce Bank Limited, Dhaka, Bangladesh
- South Indian Bank, Thrissur, India
- Southeast Bank Limited, Dhaka, Bangladesh
- Southern Bank, Mount Olive, United States
- Southwestern National Bank, Houston, United States
- Sovereign Bancorp, Philadelphia, United States
- Spar Nord Bank, Aalborg, Denmark
- Sparda-Bank, Frankfurt, Germany
- SpareBank 1 BV, Sandefjord, Norway
- SpareBank 1 Nøtterøy–Tønsberg, Nøtterøy, Norway
- SpareBank 1 Østfold Akershus, Moss, Norway
- SpareBank 1 Ringerike Hadeland, Hønefoss, Norway
- SpareBank 1 SMN, Trondheim, Norway
- SpareBank 1 SR-Bank, Stavanger, Norway
- Sparebanken Hedmark, Hamar, Norway
- Sparebanken More, Aalesund, Norway
- Sparebanken Nord-Norge, Tromsø, Norway
- Sparebanken Nordvest, Kristiansund, Norway
- Sparebanken Sør, Kristiansand, Norway
- Sparebanken Sogn og Fjordane, Sogn og Fjordane, Norway
- Sparebanken Vest, Bergen, Norway
- Sparkasse Hagen, Hagen, Germany
- Sparkasse Leipzig, Leipzig, Germany
- Sparkasse Mittelholstein, Rendsburg, Germany
- Sparkasse zu Lübeck, Lübeck, Germany
- Spire Bank, Nairobi, Kenya
- Spitamen Bank, Dushanbe, Tajikistan
- St.George Bank, Sydney, Australia
- Stadtsparkasse München, München, Germany
- Stanbic Bank, Johannesburg, South Africa
- Stanbic Bank Uganda Limited, Kampala, Uganda
- Stanbic Holdings plc, Nairobi, Kenya
- Stanbic IBTC Holdings, Lagos, Nigeria
- Standard Bank Group (Stanbank), Johannesburg, South Africa
- Standard Bank Limited, Dhaka, Bangladesh
- Standard Bank Malawi, Lilongwe, Malawi
- Standard Bank Namibia, Windhoek, Namibia
- Standard Chartered, London, United Kingdom
- Standard Chartered Bangladesh, Dhaka, Bangladesh
- Standard Chartered Bank Ghana, Accra, Ghana
- Standard Chartered Bank Hong Kong, Hong Kong, Hong Kong
- Standard Chartered Kenya, Nairobi, Kenya
- Standard Chartered Korea, Seoul, South Korea
- Standard Chartered Nepal, New Baneshwor, Kathmandu, Nepal
- Standard Chartered Pakistan, Karachi, Pakistan
- Standard Chartered Uganda, Kampala, Uganda
- Standard Chartered Zambia, Lusaka, Zambia
- Standard Chartered Zimbabwe, Harare, Zimbabwe
- State Bank of Bikaner and Jaipur, Jaipur, India
- State Bank of Hyderabad, Hyderabad, India
- State Bank of India, Mumbai, India
- State Bank of Mauritius, Port Louis, Mauritius
- State Bank of Mysore, Bangalore, India
- State Bank of Patiala, Patiala, India
- State Bank of Travancore, Thiruvananthapuram, India
- State Export-Import Bank of Ukraine, Kyiv, Ukraine
- State Savings Bank of Ukraine, Kyiv, Ukraine
- State Street Corp, Boston, United States
- Sterling Bancorp, New York, United States
- Sterling Financial Corporation, Spokane, United States
- Steyler Bank, Sant Augustin, Germany
- Stifel Financial Corp, St Louis, United States
- Südwestbank, Stuttgart, Germany
- Stusid Bank, Tunis, Tunisia
- Stuttgarter Volksbank, Stuttgart, Germany
- Sudtiroler Volksbank, Bolzano, Italy
- Sumitomo Mitsui Banking Corporation, Tokyo, Japan
- Sumitomo Mitsui Financial Group, Tokyo, Japan
- Sumitomo Mitsui Trust Bank, Tokyo, Japan
- Summit Bancorp, Arkadelphia, Arkansas, United States
- Summit Bank, Karachi, Pakistan
- Suncorp Bank, Brisbane, Australia
- Suncorp Metway, Brisbane, Australia
- Sunny Bank, Taipei, Taiwan
- Sunrise Bank, Kathmandu, Nepal
- SunTrust Banks, Atlanta, United States
- Suomen AsuntoHypoPankki, Helsinki, Finland
- Susquehanna Bancshares, Lititz, United States
- Svenska Handelsbanken, Stockholm, Sweden
- Swedbank, Stockholm, Sweden
- Sydbank, Aabenraa, Denmark
- Syndicate Bank, Manipal, India
- Synovus Financial Corp, Columbus, United States
- Syria International Islamic Bank, Damascus, Syria

== T ==
- T Bank, Athens, Greece
- Tadhamon International Islamic Bank, Sana'a, Yemen
- Taichung Commercial Bank, Taichung, Taiwan
- Taipei Fubon Bank, Taiwan
- Taishin International Bank, Taipei, Taiwan
- Taiwan Cooperative Bank, Taipei, Taiwan
- Taiwan Financial Holdings Group, Taipei, Taiwan
- Takarékbank, Budapest, Hungary
- Talmer Bancorp, Troy, United States
- Tamilnad Mercantile Bank, Tuticorin, India
- Tangerine Bank, Toronto, Canada
- Tanzania Investment Bank, Dar es Salaam, Tanzania
- Targobank, Düsseldorf, Germany
- Tatra banka, Bratislava, Slovakia
- Taunus Corporation, New York, United States
- TBC Bank, Tbilisi, Georgia
- TBI Bank, Sofia, Bulgaria
- TCF Financial Corporation, Detroit, United States
- Teachers Mutual Bank, Homebush, Australia
- Tejarat Bank, Tehran, Iran
- Tesco Bank, Edinburgh, United Kingdom
- Texas Capital Bancshares, Dallas, United States
- Texim Bank, Sofia, Bulgaria
- The 77 Bank, Tohoku, Japan
- Thanachart Bank, Bangkok, Thailand
- The Bank of East Asia, Hong Kong, Hong Kong
- The BANK of Greenland, Nuuk, Greenland
- The City Bank, Dhaka, Bangladesh
- The Commercial Bank of Qatar, Doha, Qatar
- The Farmers Bank Limited, Dhaka, Bangladesh
- The Hongkong and Shanghai Banking Corporation, Hong Kong, Hong Kong
- The National Bank TNB, Palestine
- The Senshu Bank, Japan
- Theodoor Gilissen Bankiers, Amsterdam, Netherlands
- Thüringer Aufbaubank, Thüringen, Germany
- TIAA Bank, Florida, United States
- TIB Development Bank, Dar es Salaam, Tanzania
- Time Bank Zimbabwe, Harare, Zimbabwe
- Tinkoff Bank, Moscow, Russia
- Tinkoff Credit Systems, Moscow, Russia
- Tirana Bank, Tirana, Albania
- TMB Bank, Bangkok, Thailand
- Toho Bank, Fukushima, Japan
- Tohoku Bank, Morioka, Japan
- Tokyo Star Bank, Tokyo, Japan
- Tomato Bank, Okayama, Japan
- Tompkins Financial Corporation, Ithaca, United States
- Toronto Dominion Bank (TD Bank), Toronto, Canada
- Tourism Development Bank, Kathmandu, Nepal
- Trade and Development Bank, Ulaanbataar, Mongolia
- Trade Bank of Iraq, Baghdad, Iraq
- Transcapitalbank, Moscow, Russia
- Transnational Bank, Nairobi, Kenya
- Triodos Bank, Zeist, Netherlands
- Tropical Bank, Kampala, Uganda
- Truist Financial, Charlotte, United States
- Trust Bank Limited (Bangladesh), Dhaka, Bangladesh
- Trust Merchant Bank (TMB), Kinshasa, DRC Congo
- Trustco Bank Namibia, Ongwediva, Namibia
- TSB Bank (United Kingdom), Edingburgh, United Kingdom
- Turk Ekonomi Bankasi (TEB), Istanbul, Turkey
- Turkish Bank, Istanbul, Turkey
- Turkiye Is Bankasi, Istanbul, Turkey
- Türk Ekonomi Bankası, Istanbul, Turkey
- Türk Ticaret Bankası, Istanbul, Turkey
- Türkiye İş Bankası, Levent, Istanbul, Turkey
- Tyro Payments, Sydney, Australia

== U ==
- UBank, Sydney, Australia
- UBI Banca, Bergamo, Italy
- UBS, Zurich, Switzerland
- UCO Bank, Calcutta, India
- Uganda Development Bank Limited, Kampala, Uganda
- Ukrainian Credit-Banking Union, Kyiv, Ukraine
- UkrSibbank, Kyiv, Ukraine
- Ukrsotsbank, Kyiv, Ukraine
- Ulster Bank Ireland, Dublin, Ireland
- Umpqua Holdings Corporation, Portland, United States
- Umweltbank, Nürnberg, Germany
- Unibank, Baku, Azerbaijan
- Unibank, Port-au-Prince, Haiti
- Unibank Ghana, Accra, Ghana
- Unibank (Azerbaijan), Baku, Azerbaijan
- Unicaja, Malaga, Spain
- UniCredit, Milan, Italy
- UniCredit Bank Czech Republic and Slovakia, Prague, Czech Republic
- UniCredit Bank Romania, Bucharest, Romania
- UniCredit Bank Russia, Moscow, Russia
- UniCredit Bank Serbia, Belgrade, Serbia
- UniCredit Bank Slovenia, Ljubljana, Slovenia
- UniCredit Bulbank, Sofia, Bulgaria
- UniCredit Tiriac Bank, Bucharest, Romania
- Union Bancaire Privée, Geneva, Switzerland
- Union Bank (Albania), Tirana, Albania
- Union Bank of Colombo, Colombo, Sri Lanka
- Union Bank of India, Mumbai, India
- Union Bank of Israel, Tel Aviv, Israel
- Union Bank of Nigeria, Lagos, Nigeria
- Union Bank of Taiwan, Taipei, Taiwan
- Union Bank UK, London, United Kingdom
- Union National Bank, Abu Dhabi, United Arab Emirates
- Union Trust Bank, Freetown, Sierra Leone
- Unione di Banche Italiane, Bergamo, Italy
- Unione Fiduciaria, Milan, Italy
- Unipol Banca, Bologna, Italy
- Unistream, Russia
- United Amara Bank, Yangon, Myanmar
- United Bank for Africa, Lagos, Nigeria
- United Bank for Africa (Uganda), Nigeria
- United Bank of Albania, Tirana, Albania
- United Bank of India, Calcutta, India
- United Bank Limited (Pakistan), Karachi, Pakistan
- United Bankshares, Charleston, United States
- United Bulgarian Bank, Sofia, Bulgaria
- United Coconut Planters Bank (UCPB), Makati City, Philippines
- United Commercial Bank, Dhaka, Bangladesh
- United Commercial Bank Ltd, Dhaka, Bangladesh
- United Community Banks, Blairsville, United States
- United Gulf Bank, Manama, Bahrain
- United International Bank, New York, United States
- United Orient Bank, New York, United States
- United Overseas Bank, Singapore, Singapore
- United Security Bancshares, Thomasville, United States
- Unity Bank, Abuja, Nigeria
- Unity Trust Bank, Birmingham, United Kingdom
- Urner Kantonalbank, Altdorf, Switzerland
- Uralsib, Moscow, Russia
- Urban Partnership Bank, Chicago, United States
- Urwego Opportunity Bank, Kigali, Rwanda
- US Bancorp, Minneapolis, United States
- UT Bank, Accra, Ghana
- Uttara Bank, Dhaka, Bangladesh

== V ==
- VakıfBank, Levent, Istanbul, Turkey
- Valley National Bancorp, Wayne, United States
- Vancouver City Savings Credit Union, Vancouver, Canada
- Van Lanschot Kempen, 's-Hertogenbosch, Netherlands
- Varengold Bank, Hamburg, Germany
- Vattanac Bank, Phnom Penh, Cambodia
- VBS Mutual Bank, Louis Trichardt, South Africa
- VBU Volksbank im Unterland eG, Schwaigern, Germany
- VDK Spaarbank, Belgium
- VEB.RF, Moscow, Russia
- VEM Aktienbank, Munich, Germany
- Veneto Banca, Montebelluna, Italy
- Victoria Commercial Bank, Nairobi, Kenya
- Vietnam Bank for Agriculture and Rural Development, Hanoi, Vietnam
- Vijaya Bank, Bangalore, India
- Viking Bank, Saint Petersburg, Russia
- Virginia Commerce Bancorp, Arlington, United States
- Vnesheconombank, Moscow, Russia
- Volksbank Bielefeld-Gütersloh, Gütersloh, Germany
- Volksbank Neckartal, Eberbach, Germany
- Volt Bank, Sydney, Australia
- Voss Veksel- og Landmandsbank, Voss, Norway
- Vostochny Bank, Blagoveshchensk, Russia
- Vozrozhdenie Bank, Moscow, Russia
- VP Bank AG, Vaduz, Liechtenstein
- Všeobecná úverová banka, Bratislava, Slovakia
- VTB Bank, St Petersburg, Russia
- VTB Bank Deutschland, Frankfurt am Main, Germany

== W ==
- WaFd Bank, Seattle, United States
- Walser Privatbank, Hirschegg, Austria
- Warka Bank, Baghdad, Iraq
- WeBank (Italy), Milan, Italy
- Webster Financial Corp, Waterbury, United States
- Wegagen Bank, Addis Ababa, Ethiopia
- Wells Fargo & Co, San Francisco, United States
- West Bromwich Building Society, West Bromwich, United Kingdom
- Westpac, Sydney, Australia
- WGZ Bank, Düsseldorf, Germany
- Wing Hang Bank, Hong Kong, Hong Kong
- Wing Lung Bank, Hong Kong, Hong Kong
- Wintrust Financial Corp, Lake Forest, United States
- Wirecard, Munich, Germany
- Woodforest Financial Group, The Woodlands, United States
- Woori Bank, Seoul, South Korea
- Woori Financial Group, Seoul, South Korea
- Workers United, New York, United States
- Wüstenrot Bank, Ludwigsburg, Germany
- Wüstenrot & Württembergische, Stuttgart, Germany

== X ==
- XacBank, Ulaanbataar, Mongolia
- Xiamen International Bank, Xiamen, China
- Xinja, Sydney, Australia

== Y ==
- yA Bank, Oslo, Norway
- Yamagata Bank, Tokyo, Japan
- Yamaguchi Bank, Shimonoseki, Japan
- Yapi Kredi Bank Azerbaijan, Baku, Azerbaijan
- Yapı ve Kredi Bankası, Istanbul, Turkey
- Yemen Commercial Bank, Sana'a, Yemen
- Yes Bank, Mumbai, India
- Yoma Bank, Yangon, Myanmar
- Yorkshire Building Society, Bradford, United Kingdom

== Z ==
- Zag Bank, High River Canada
- Zagrebacka Banka, Zagreb, Croatia
- Zamanbank, Kazakhstan
- Zambia National Commercial Bank, Lusaka, Zambia
- Zarai Taraqiati Bank Limited, Islamabad, Pakistan
- ZAO Raiffeisenbank, Moscow, Russia
- Zenith Bank, Lagos, Nigeria
- Zhejiang Chouzhou Commercial Bank, Yiwu, China
- Zhejiang Tailong Commercial Bank, Taizhou, China
- Zions Bancorporation, Salt Lake City, United States
- Ziraat Bankası, Ulus, Ankara, Turkey
- Ziraat Katılım, Turkey
- Zuger Kantonalbank, Zug, Switzerland
- Zurich Cantonal Bank, Zurich, Switzerland

== See also ==
- List of banks in Africa
- List of banks in the Americas
- List of banks in Asia
- List of banks in Europe
