= United Security Bancshares =

- Type: Public
- Traded as: Nasdaq: UBFO; Russell 2000 Index component
- Industry: Banking
- Founded: 2001; 25 years ago
- Headquarters: Fresno, California
- Key people: Dennis R. Woods (president & CEO); Bhavneet Gill (CFO)
- Revenue: ▲$0.033 billion (2016)
- Net income: ▲$0.007 billion (2016)
- Total assets: ▲$0.787 billion (2016)
- Total equity: ▲$0.096 billion (2016)
- Number of employees: 132
- Website: unitedsecuritybank.com

United Security Bancshares is a bank holding company based in Fresno, California, that operates eleven branches. On April 1, 2026, it was announced that the merger of its operations with those of Community West Bancshares had been completed, with Community West Bank remaining as the surviving bank.

== History ==
United Security Bank was formed on December 21, 1987. In March 2001, it became a subsidiary of United Security Bancshares, a bank holding company.

In June 2009, it entered into an agreement with the Federal Reserve Bank of San Francisco as a result of its level of non-performing assets.

In 2014, the bank settled a dispute with TRC Operating Company over fraudulent wire transfers for $350,000. The authentication credentials for TRCs account had been compromised which allowed hackers to transfer the money.
