= Credit Bank of Albania =

Bank of Albania

- Type: Private
- Industry: Banking
- Founded: 2003; 23 years ago
- Founder: Jassim al-Kharafi; Nasser al-Kharafi; Fauzi al-Kharafi
- Defunct: 23 October 2020
- Headquarters: Tirana
- Products: Banking services
- Website: creditbankofalbania.al

Credit Bank of Albania (CBA) was a private commercial bank headquartered in Tirana, Albania. It launched operations in March 2003. The bank's founders and shareholders were Kuwaiti entrepreneurs Jassim al-Kharafi, Nasser al-Kharafi and Fauzi al-Kharafi.

CBA's core lending activity focused on corporate clients but it also offered traditional banking products and services, such as checking accounts, saving accounts, time deposits and lending services.

The bank was dissolved in 2019.
