= Banco Paris =

Bank of Chile

Logo of the disappeared Chilean bank Banco Paris

Banco Paris was a bank in Chile.

== Overview ==
It was created in 2004 with the Santiago Express division of Banco Santander-Chile. Horst Paulmann, the CEO of Cencosud, sits on the Board of Directors.
