= Myanma Investment and Commercial Bank =

Myanma state-owned bank

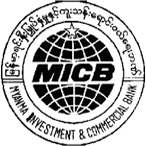
- Native name: မြန်မာ့ရင်းနှီးမြှုပ်နှံမှုနှင့် ကူးသန်းရောင်းဝယ်ရေးဘဏ်
- Industry: Banking
- Founded: July 4, 1990
- Headquarters: No. 170-176, Bo Aung Kyaw Street, Botataung Township, Yangon, Myanmar
- Website: www.micb.gov.mm

The Myanma Investment and Commercial Bank (Burmese: မြန်မာ့ရင်းနှီးမြှုပ်နှံမှုနှင့် ကူးသန်းရောင်းဝယ်ရေးဘဏ်; abbreviated MICB) is a state-owned bank. MICB has branches mainly in Yangon and Mandalay and focuses primarily on business and domestic currency-denominated lending for commercial, investment, and development activities. MFTB also manages Burma's official foreign currency reserves. MICB also acts as a banking intermediary for foreign investment activities.

The bank was established under the Financial Institutions of Myanmar Law of 1990, which separated the bank from Myanma Economic Bank.

The Myanmar entities that were slapped with sanctions by the US Treasury Department on June 21, 2023 included the Ministry of Defense, the Myanmar Foreign Trade Bank, and the Myanmar Investment and Commerce Bank.
