= Quontic Bank =

US-based bank

Quontic
- Company type: Private company
- Industry: Banking
- Founded: Great Neck, New York, U.S. 2009
- Headquarters: Astoria, New York City, New York, United States
- Key people: George Lazaridis (Interim CEO)
- Products: Retail Banking; Mortgage loan
- Total assets: US$ 1 billion (2020)
- Number of employees: 200

Quontic is a U.S.-based digital bank headquartered in Astoria, New York City. Quontic has additional loan office locations in New York; Melville, New York; Flushing, New York; and Miami, Florida. Quontic offers personal checking, savings and certificate of deposits accounts as well as a variety of mortgage loan products with an emphasis on non-traditional borrowers.

== History ==
In late 2009, real estate developer and entrepreneur Steven Schnall bought Golden First Bank; a small, troubled bank in Great Neck, New York with $24 million in assets. Terms of the sale allowed Schnall to buy the bank with a clean balance sheet. Schnall assembled a new team, injected fresh capital, and renamed it "Quontic Bank." In March 2011, Quontic opened a second branch in the Astoria, Queens neighborhood of New York City Later in 2011, it shuttered the Great Neck location and moved its headquarters to Astoria. Since its humble beginnings, Quontic has gone branchless and expanded to serve bank and mortgage customers across the US. Though Quontic had expanded its loan offices to states such as Georgia, New Jersey, and Massachusetts, it now has locations in just 2 states: Florida and New York.

In 2015, Quontic was awarded the title of Community Development Financial Institution and is the only all-digital CDFI bank in the United States. In 2020, Quontic became the first US bank to offer Bitcoin Rewards Checking, and in 2022 became the first US bank to offer a Pay Ring contactless payment device for its checking accounts and was the first bank to open an outpost in the Metaverse. Quontic was named Best Savings Account 2023 by Bankrate, Best Overall Online Bank of 2022 by Forbes, America's Best Banks 2022 by Newsweek and Most Innovative Online Bank 2022-2023 by Money.com.

== Locations ==
=== New York ===
Quontic was founded in New York and headquartered in the Astoria, Queens neighborhood of New York City. The Astoria location has a home mortgage office, which has gained media attention for its lending to Queens' large immigrant community.

Quontic operated a home mortgage office in Jericho, Long Island before moving to Melville in October 2016.

=== Florida ===
Quontic operates a home mortgage office in Coral Gables, a city southwest of Downtown Miami.
