= Tourism Development Bank =

Nepali national development bank

Tourism Development Bank Limited
- Company type: Public
- Traded as: NEPSE: TDBL
- Industry: Banking
- Founded: October 28, 2009
- Headquarters: Gyaneshwor, Kathmandu, Nepal
- Area served: Nepal
- Key people: Mahesh Sharma Dhakal (CEO)
- Products: Loans, Savings, Investments, Remittance, International Travel Card
- Number of employees: 330
- Website: www.tdbl.com.np

Tourism Development Bank Ltd (Nepali: टुरिजम डेभलपमेण्ट बैंक लिमिटेड; NEPSE: TDBL) was a national level development bank in Nepal with its corporate office located in Kathmandu. The bank was established in 2009 and offered a wide range of financial products and services. It had a paid up capital of NPR 780 million and had 15 branches. The bank was also a member of society for worldwide international financial telecommunications SWIFT.

== Expansion ==
Tourism Development Bank completed the acquisition of Kalinchowk Development Bank & Matribhumi Bikas Bank and started joint operation on January 8, 2017. After the acquisition and further expansion of its business and capital, the bank's paid-up capital reached Rs 2002.7 million. The deposit base reached Rs 13100 million, and the bank floated loans worth Rs 12000 million. The development bank provided services to more than 100000 customers all over the country from 36 branches, 5 extension counters, and 19 ATM centers.

== See also ==
- List of banks in Nepal
