= Metals-banka =

Serbian commercial and investment bank

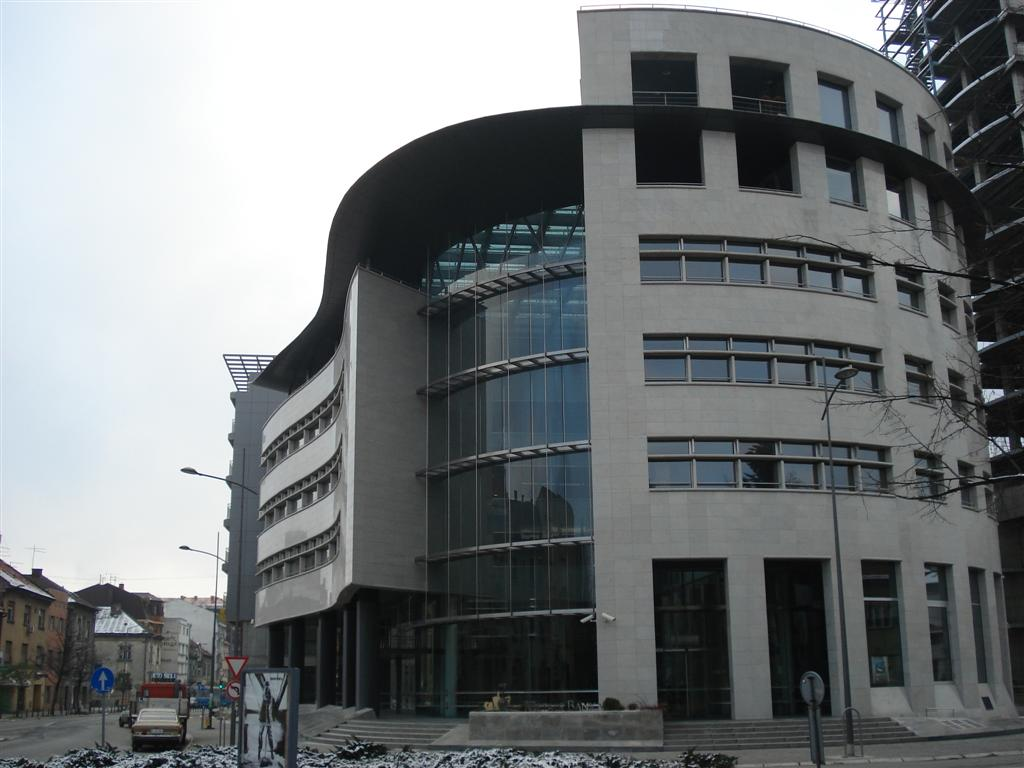
- Head office in Novi Sad
- Type: Joint-stock company
- Industry: Financial services
- Founded: 1990
- Fate: Bankruptcy procedure (since 2013)
- Headquarters: Novi Sad, Serbia
- Services: Commercial and investment banking

Metals-banka (Serbian: Металс-банка) or Development Bank of Vojvodina (Serbian Cyrillic: Развојна Банка Војводине), is a Serbian commercial and investment bank, which declared bankruptcy in 2013.

== History ==
The bank was founded in 1990 by metal processing enterprises.

Since 2001, Metals Banka has strengthened its position on the market, becoming the majority owner of the banks DTD banka and DDOR banka, which later merged with Metals banka. The bank maintains a strategic partnership with the insurance company DDOR Novi Sad, which is the bank's main shareholder with 15.12% of the capital. Metals banka was included in the BELEX15 index on December 12, 2006 on the Belgrade Stock Exchange. In July 2009, the Vojvodina government took over 61.9% of the shares.

In 2005, the bank acquired its rival "DDOR banka" in 2005 for an undisclosed amount. In 2010, a majority of shares of Metals-banka was acquired by the provincial government of Vojvodina and turned into the "Development Bank of Vojvodina". In April 2013, the bank went into bankruptcy procedure due to insolvency. It was caused by issuing loans without proper guarantees, which cost the bank around 20 million euros.

== Activities ==
Razvojna banka Vojvodina offers various operations, such as current accounts, deposits, transfers, loans, currency exchange, money transfer, as well as other services such as electronic banking or credit cards. Elle propose également des services de courtage.
