= Union Bank UK =

Union Bank UK plc (UBUK) was a UK-incorporated bank that specialized in services to Nigeria and West Africa. Established in London in 1983, it operated for decades as a subsidiary of the Union Bank of Nigeria before becoming an independent UK entity in 2004. In 2023, following its acquisition by Fidelity Bank, the institution was renamed FidBank UK Limited.

== History ==
Union Bank UK plc was formerly a subsidiary of the Union Bank of Nigeria but was fully divested in 2020. The bank operated from the City of London beginning in 1983, initially as the London branch of its parent institution, and from October 2004 as an independently incorporated UK bank authorized by the Financial Services Authority (later the UK Financial Conduct Authority). UBUK offered banking services to customers engaged in business with Nigeria and other West African countries. Its portfolio included trade finance, personal banking, business banking, treasury services, commercial lending, and private banking. The bank was particularly active in trade finance, providing instruments such as letters of credit and export finance. These services were vital for businesses involved in cross-border transactions, ensuring secure and efficient payment mechanisms.

== Origins ==
UBUK traced its origins to the Union Bank of Nigeria, itself descended from the Union Bank of India, which began in 1917 as the Colonial Bank. In 1925, the institution was acquired by Barclays, becoming Barclays Bank Dominion, Colonial and Overseas, a name it retained until the early 1970s. In 1971, Barclays incorporated the bank locally in Nigeria as Barclays Bank of Nigeria plc, selling a significant shareholding to the Federal Government and the Nigerian public. In 1979, the bank was renamed Union Bank of Nigeria plc to reflect its new ownership structure. During the early 1990s, the Nigerian Government pursued a privatization policy for state-owned enterprises. In 1993, both the Government and Barclays sold their remaining stakes, creating a fully publicly owned bank.

== Divestment and acquisition ==
In 2020, Union Bank UK was divested from Union Bank of Nigeria to become an independent UK entity. In September 2023, following a deal announced the previous year, Fidelity Bank completed the acquisition of 100% of Union Bank UK. The bank was subsequently renamed FidBank UK Limited and remains in operation under this name.
