= Pacific Mercantile Bancorp =

American bank

- Traded as: Nasdaq: PMBC
- Industry: Banking
- Founded: March 1999; 27 years ago
- Fate: Acquired by Banc of California
- Headquarters: Costa Mesa, California
- Key people: Denis P. Kalscheur, Chairman; Brad R. Dinsmore, CEO & President; Curt Christianssen, CFO
- Net income: ▼$5 million (2019)
- Total assets: ▲$1.416 billion (2019)
- Total equity: ▲$149 million (2019)
- Number of employees: 160 (2019)
- Website: www.pmbank.com

Pacific Mercantile Bancorp was a bank holding company based in Costa Mesa, California.

== History ==
In March 1999, the bank opened its first branch.

In September 2003, the bank opened a branch in La Habra, California.

In 2000, the company became a public company via an initial public offering.

In October 2004, the bank opened a branch in Long Beach, California.

In 2005, the company exited the wholesale mortgage business.

In April 2013, Raymond E. Dellerba, the founding chairman and chief executive officer, retired.

In June 2016, the company was added to the Russell 3000 Index.

In October 2021, the company was acquired by Banc of California and delisted from the Nasdaq.
