= New Omni Bank =

New Omni Bank N.A.
- Company type: Private
- Industry: Finance and Insurance
- Founded: Alhambra, California (2011)
- Headquarters: Alhambra, California
- Key people: Chris Huang, CEO
- Products: Banking
- Website: www.newomnibank.com

New Omni Bank, N.A. (Chinese: 華采商業銀行) is an FDIC-Insured commercial bank, headquartered in Alhambra, California, United States. It has branch offices in Alhambra, California, Arcadia, California, Rowland Heights, California, and Irvine, California.

New Omni Bank, N.A. was originally chartered as "Monterey Park National Bank" in 1980 to serve the influx of Taiwanese immigrants. The original headquarters was in Monterey Park, California, at the time nicknamed "Little Taipei" because of the many Taiwanese immigrants settled in the area.
