= United Orient Bank =

New York Bank

- Company type: Private
- Industry: Finance and Insurance
- Founded: April 9, 1981
- Founder: James S. C. Chao
- Headquarters: Chinatown, Manhattan; New York City, New York, U.S.
- Products: Banking
- AUM: USD $98,200,000
- Website: www.uobusa.com

United Orient Bank (Chinese: 東方銀行; lit. 'Bank of the East / Eastern Bank') is an American bank established to serve the Chinese-American community of New York City. Headquartered in New York City, with branch offices in Chinatown, Manhattan, the bank is privately held and claims itself as the first indigenous community bank in Chinatown, Manhattan when it was established on April 9, 1981. The bank operates two full-service branches in the Chinatown section of Manhattan: its main branch at 10 Chatham Square, located in a low-income census tract, and a second branch on Canal Street, located in a middle-income census tract. The bank is designated a minority depository institution ("MDI") by the New York State Department of Financial Services. Its products and services include checking accounts, savings accounts, certificates of deposit, safe deposit boxes, commercial loans, and wire transfer services. As of December 31, 2023, the bank received a Community Reinvestment Act ("CRA") rating of "Satisfactory", a score of 2 on a 1-to-4 scale, from the New York State Department of Financial Services.

The slogan of the bank is: “to put the area's resources to work locally”. It was one of the first US Banks established to serve the Chinese community in the United States as well as one of the first to provide Individual Retirement Accounts for its clients.

In August 1987, the United Orient Bank was indicted by a federal grand jury in Manhattan for failing to report cash transactions exceeding $10,000. The indictment was pronounced by Rudolph Giuliani, then the US Attorney for the Southern District of New York.

In 1995, Yungman Lee was named President and CEO of the United Orient Bank, where he served for seven years.

== Governance ==
- 1994–1995: William D. Hoffman (President and CEO)
- 1995–2002: Yungman Lee (President and CEO)
