= California First Leasing Corporation =

California First National Bancorp
- Company type: Public
- Traded as: OTCQX: CFNB
- Industry: Financial
- Founded: 1977; 49 years ago
- Headquarters: Irvine, California, US
- Key people: Patrick E. Paddon (chairman & CEO)
- Services: Leasing and banking services
- Operating income: ▲US$ 21.403 million (2013)
- Net income: ▲US$ 18.464 million (2013)
- Total assets: ▲US$ 558.903 million (2013)
- Total equity: ▲US$ 180,879 million (2013)
- Number of employees: 102 (2013)
- Website: calfirstbancorp.com

California First National Bancorp, headquartered in California, is a registered financial holding company for California First National Bank and California First Leasing Corp. The company currently operates with two primary businesses including an FDIC-insured national bank and a leading leasing company specializing in financing high-technology capital assets. The company offers various leasing and banking services including leasing and financing capital assets, leasing non-high technology property, accepting various deposit products and various commercial loans for corporations, companies, educational institute and other social organizations.
