= Abhyudaya Co-operative Bank =

Bank in India

Abhyudaya Bank
- Company type: Co-Operative
- Industry: Banking; Financial services
- Founded: June 1967
- Headquarters: Mumbai, India
- Key people: SITARAM CHIMAJI GHANDAT (managing director)
- Products: Forex & trade Mortgages; Demat Services internet banking
- Revenue: ▲₹131,452.844 million (US$1.4 billion)(2012–13)
- Net income: ▲₹912.177 million (US$9.5 million)(2012–13)
- Website: www.abhyudayabank.co.in

Abhyudaya Co-operative Bank Ltd is an urban multi-state Cooperative banking institution based in Maharashtra, India and operating as a co-operative bank since 1965.

== History ==
In the year 1964 several social workers and activists came together and formed Abhyudaya Co-operative Credit Society Ltd with a relatively small share capital of ₹5,000 (US$52).
Within a short period of time Abhyudaya Co-op, Credit Society got converted into an Urban Co-operative bank.
In June 1965 Abhyudaya Co-operative Bank Ltd was finally established as a full-fledged co-operative Bank.
It was conferred with Scheduled bank status by the Reserve Bank of India in the year 1988.
On 11 January 2007 the Bank was registered as a multi-state co-operative bank by the Central Registrar, New Delhi.

== Branches ==
It has branches in Metropolitan Mumbai, Navi Mumbai, Pune, Thane, Raigad, Nagpur, Nashik, Nanded, Kankavali and Aurangabad in Maharashtra State, Vadodara and Ahmedabad in Gujarat State, Udupi and Mangalore in Karnataka State.

The area of operation of the bank is confined to 3 States

- Maharashtra
- Gujarat
- Karnataka.

The Bank further proposes to extend its area of operation to other States.

== Acquisitions ==
- Pune based Citizens Co-op Bank
- Vadodara based Shree Krishna Co-operative Bank
- Ahmedabad based Manekchowk Co-operative Bank
- Udupi based Janatha Co-op. Bank Ltd.

== Controversy ==
RBI imposes Rs 58 lakh penalty on Abhyudaya Co-operative Bank for not following norms. Maharashtra based Multi-State Scheduled Bank- Abhyudaya also failed to perform well on several financial parameters in the 2020-21 FY. The profit of the bank has decreased by over 12 crore and the Gross and Net NPA levels have increased.

== See also ==
- Co-operative banking
