= Bank Forum =

- Company type: JSC
- Industry: Financial services
- Founded: 1994
- Headquarters: Kyiv, Ukraine
- Key people: Vadym Berezovyk, CEO; Sascha Klaus, Chairman of the Supervisory
- Products: Retail, commercial and commercial real estate banking
- Number of employees: 3,500 (end 2010)
- Website: www.forum.ua

Bank Forum (full name – Public Joint-Stock Company Bank Forum) was a Ukrainian bank headquartered in Kyiv, Ukraine. Founded in 1994, the bank was acquired by Smart Holding in 2012.

== Ownership and management ==
On September 17, 2007, the shareholders of PJSC Bank Forum and Commerzbank AG (Germany) have signed an agreement on acquisition by Commerzbank AG of 60% plus one share of Bank Forum. As of 01.11.2011, Commerzbank AG owns a 96.06% stake in PJSC Bank Forum. Shareholders: Commerzbank AG - 96,06% State Street Bank and Trust Company - 1,50% Other shareholders - 2.44% The chairman of the Board of Bank Forum Commerzbank Group is Vadym Berezovyk.

July 30, 2012, Commerzbank sold its stake to Ukrainian Smart Group.

The bank is currently under liquidation according to the National Bank of Ukraine.

== Activities ==
Bank Forum was founded in 1994 and operated in Ukraine.

Bank Forum was a universal bank which offered a range of banking services.

The bank’s annual financial statements were confirmed by independent international auditors. Every year Bank Forum was rated by Moody's Investors Service (since 2004; ratings as of 1 December 2011: B1/B3) and Fitch Ratings (since 2006; rating as of 1 December 2011 is B).

Since 2001 Bank Forum cooperated with the European Bank for Reconstruction and Development (EBRD), implementing in Ukraine several joint programs. Programs included a Lending Program for Small and medium-sized Businesses, a Microlending Program, a Trade Facilitation Program, Mortgage Lending Program. In December 2007 Bank Forum became a participant in the all-Ukrainian EBRD program on energy efficiency increase.

Bank Forum was the first Ukrainian banking institution to conduct private placement of 10% of its shares among foreign investors (in 2005), and in 2006 issued and successfully placed Eurobonds.

== Bank Membership ==
- MasterCard International
- VISA International (principal member)
- Association of Ukrainian Banks (AUB)
- EBRD Agent for a number of business financing programs
- American Chamber of Commerce in Ukraine (ACCU)
- Deposit Guarantee Fund
- First All-Ukrainian Bureau of Credit Histories
- Ukrainian Interbank Currency Exchange
- Professional Association of Registrars and Depositories
- Ukrainian Credit-Bank Union
- PFTS Stock Exchange
- Joint ATM network ATMoSfera
- Joint ATM network Euronet
