= Russtroybank =

Russian commercial bank

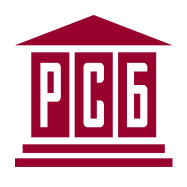
- Native name: Русстройбанк
- Company type: Private (ЗАО)
- Industry: Banking; Financial services
- Founded: 1995; 31 years ago
- Headquarters: Moscow, Russia
- Key people: Nikolay Ivaschuk, (Chairman); Andrey Strukov, (CEO)
- Products: Retail banking, corporate banking, finance and insurance, mortgage loans, savings, credit cards
- Total assets: ▲US$ 772.9 million (2013)
- Total equity: ▲US$ 86.1 million (2014)
- Number of employees: 796 (2013)
- Website: www.russtroybank.ru

Russtroybank (Russian: Русстройбанк) is a Russian commercial bank. Its full name is Closed Joint Stock Company RUSSIAN CONSTRUCTION BANK. The bank is headquartered in Moscow.

== History ==
The bank was founded in 1995.

It has held a general license for banking operations issued by the Central Bank of Russia since September 7, 2012. It is also License to conduct banking operations with precious metals No. 3205 since July 6, 2006.

== Ratings ==
As of 2013, the Bank was ranked among the top 150 banks in Russia. According to Moody's Interfax Rating Agency, based on 2012 results, it took the 145th place in terms of assets. According to the "RBC" agency ranking, at the end of 2012, the bank took the 120th place in terms of size of liquid assets, ranked 116th largest on its loan portfolio (91st place on loans to legal entities), on loans to individuals it ranked 159th, and 116th was its position in terms of deposit portfolio.

Russian credit ratings agency Expert RA assigned the bank's credit rating at A level: "high level of creditworthiness".
