= Mackinac Financial Corporation =

Holding company

- Type: Public
- Traded as: Nasdaq: MFNC
- Industry: Finance
- Founded: 1974; 52 years ago
- Fate: Acquired by Nicolet Bankshares
- Headquarters: Manistique, Michigan, United States
- Key people: Paul Tobias (chairman and CEO)
- Products: Financial services
- Net income: $19.824 million (Dec. 31, 2012)
- Total assets: $545.980 million (Dec. 31, 2012)
- Total equity: ▲US$ 72.448 million (2012)
- Website: www.bankmbank.com

Mackinac Financial Corporation was a Manistique, Michigan-based bank holding company for Michigan bank mBank. It provided commercial and retail banking products and services and was incorporated on December 16, 1974. The company's common stock was traded on the NASDAQ stock market under the symbol of "MFNC" until the company was acquired by Nicolet National Bank in September 2021.

== Operations ==
The company, through the operation of its subsidiary mBank, offered loan and deposit products, customary retail services, and commercial banking services including time deposits, interest-bearing transaction accounts, real estate mortgage lending, commercial lending, and lease financing. Apart from the bank, the company also operated non-bank subsidiaries: First Manistique Agency, First Rural Relending Company, and North Country Capital Trust to offer financial services.

== Acquisitions ==
- The company completed the acquisition of UP Financial, Inc in 1997.
- The company completed the acquisition of South Range State Bank in 1996.
- The company completed the acquisition of Bank of Stephenson in 1993.
- The company announced a stock buyback program at its 2013 February meeting, which authorized the repurchase of $600,000 of the company's outstanding common stock over two years.
- The company announced the acquisition of the First National Bank of Eagle River, making it the largest bank headquartered in the Upper Peninsula with $900 million in assets.
- The company completed its acquisition of First Federal of Northern Michigan Bancorp Inc. for $41.6 million in 2018.
