= Banque Bemo Saudi Fransi =

- Company type: Public
- Industry: Banking
- Founded: 2004
- Headquarters: Damascus, Syria
- Area served: Syria, Saudi Arabia, Lebanon
- Key people: Riyad Obegi (Chairman)
- Number of employees: 700+
- Website: http://www.bbsfbank.com/

Banque Bemo Saudi Fransi (Arabic: بنك بيمو السعودي الفرنسي) is a Syrian private bank. BBSF was the first operational private bank in Syria in almost 20 years when it launched its operations on January 4, 2004. Its main shareholders are the Lebanese bank Banque Bemo S.A.L. and the Saudi bank Banque Saudi Fransi.
