= Future Bank =

- Industry: Financial services
- Founded: 2004; 22 years ago
- Headquarters: Manama, Bahrain
- Total assets: $1.51 billion (2015)
- Owner: Bank Melli Iran (33%); Bank Saderat Iran (33%); Ahli United Bank (33%)
- Website: futurebank.com.bh

Future Bank B.S.C. (Arabic: بنك المستقبل) is a commercial bank that was based in Manama, Bahrain. It started as a joint venture by Ahli United Bank and two Iranian state-owned banks, Bank Melli and Bank Saderat.

Central Bank of Bahrain closed down the bank in 2016 after Bahrain cut diplomatic ties with Iran. In 2017, Central Bank of the Islamic Republic of Iran licensed the bank to open a branch in Kish Island.
