= United Bank of Albania =

Albanian bank based in Tirana

- Company type: Privately held company
- Industry: Financial services
- Founded: 1994; 32 years ago
- Headquarters: Tirana, Albania
- Products: Banking services
- Website: uba.com.al

The United Bank of Albania, formerly known as the Arab-Albanian Islamic Bank, is an Albanian bank that provides banking services with headquarters in Tirana.

In 2021, United Bank of Albania had a market share of 0.67%, making it the smallest bank in Albania.

== History ==
The bank was founded by the state-owned National Commercial Bank of Albania (NCBA) and a group of Islamic investors. In 2000 NCBA was privatized and its 40% stake in UBA was acquired by the Ministry of Finance. In March 2009 the Ministry of Finance agreed to sell 40% of its shares to the Islamic Development Bank.
