= Golden Bank =

Golden Bank, N.A.

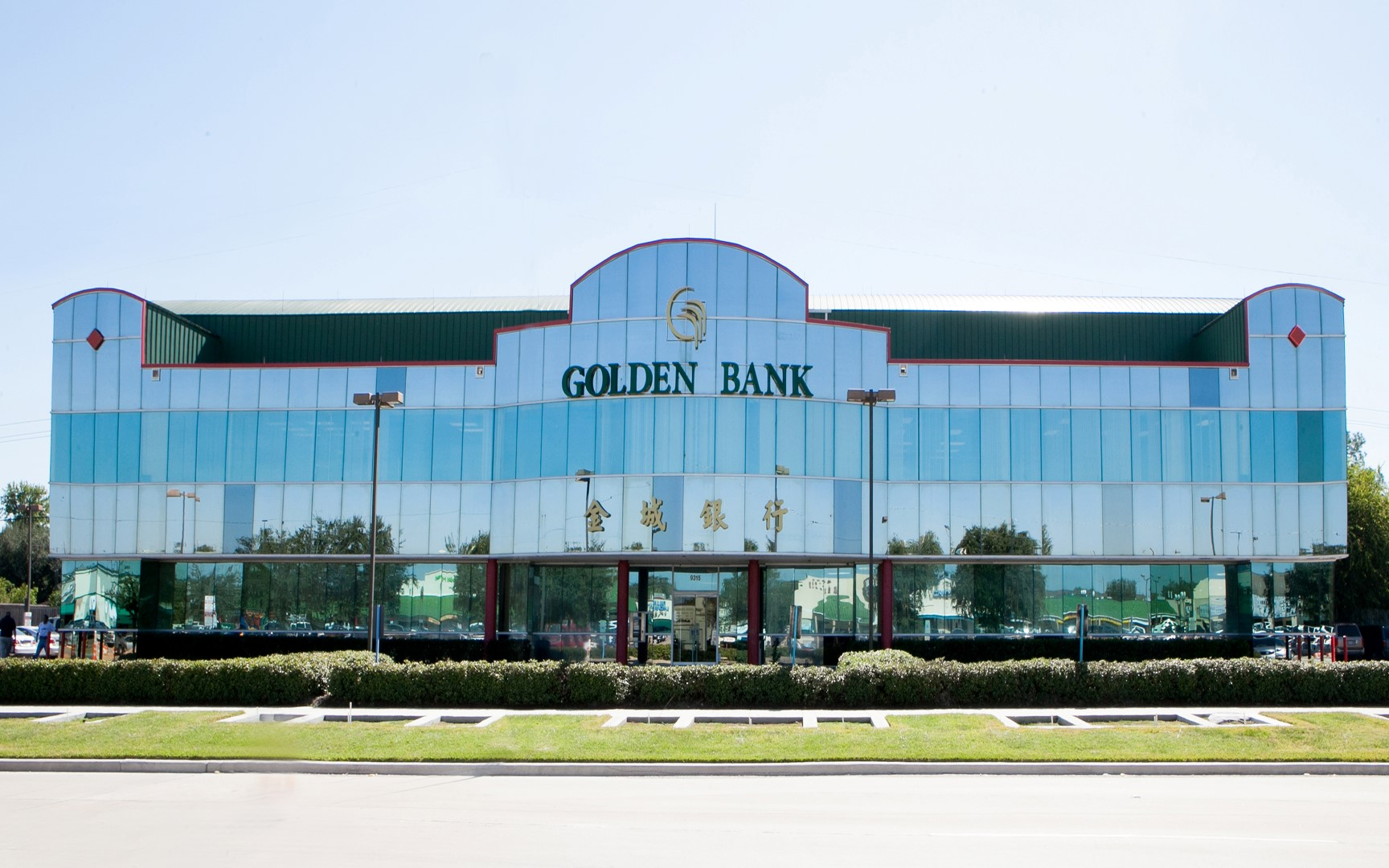
- Golden Bank, headquarters in Chinatown, Houston
- Native name: 金城銀行
- Formerly: Texas First National Bank
- Company type: Private
- Industry: Financial services
- Founded: May 3, 1985; 41 years ago in Houston, Texas
- Headquarters: Houston, Texas, United States
- Number of locations: 12
- Key people: Kenneth Wu, Chairman David Lin, CEO Herbert Ng, President
- Services: Banking

Golden Bank (Chinese: 金城銀行; pinyin: Jīnchéng yínháng) is the first and one of the largest Asian American banks based in Texas. It is the second minority-owned bank in the Greater Houston area and one of the largest Asian American banks that are still privately owned. Golden Bank currently has branches in the Greater Houston area and Dallas-Fort Worth area and branches in California.

== History ==
Golden Bank was first founded under the name of Texas First National Bank by a group of Taiwan immigrants in Houston on May 3, 1985. The Bank changed its name to Golden Bank in 2006.

== Overview ==
Golden Bank was established in Houston, Texas in 1985. As the first minority-owned bank in Greater Houston area, Golden Bank has provided commercial banking services including taking deposits (DDA, NOW, Money Market, Savings, Time Deposits, Traditional and Roth IRAs), extending loans (Commercial, Construction, Real Estate, Consumer, Small Business, Mortgages, etc.), providing trade finance, online/mobile banking, cash management and other banking services to businesses and residents within its service areas.

Golden Bank's branch network that contains three branch offices in Greater Houston area (Bellaire Blvd., Harwin Drive, and Sugar Land), two branch offices in Dallas-Fort Worth area (Richardson and Plano), three branch offices in Southern California (Tustin, Alhambra and Rowland Heights) and three branch offices in Northern California (Cupertino, Fremont and Millbrae). It also operates one loan production office in Southern California (Irvine).
