= Bank Sparhafen Zürich =

- Native name: Bank Sparhafen Zürich AG
- Industry: Financial services
- Founded: 1850; 176 years ago
- Headquarters: Fraumünsterstrasse 21, CH-8001 Zürich, Switzerland
- Website: www.sparhafen.ch

Bank Sparhafen Zürich is a Swiss regional bank based in Zürich, Switzerland. Its business is traditionally in retail banking, mortgage loans, private banking and banking with small and medium-sized enterprises.

== History ==
In 1850 the company was founded as an association and converted to a cooperative in 1906.

In 1977 it bought several multi-family houses and entered the real estate business, subsequently built via further purchases. To divide the bank business and real estate activities, a new organization was founded in 2004. The former cooperative bank Sparhafen Zürich was converted to the roofing company BSZ Genossenschaft. The existing banking was incorporated to the new subsidiary Bank Sparhafen Zürich, and the properties management was transferred to the subsidiary BSZ Immobilien AG.

In 2009 the bank was included to the RBA-Holding AG, where it belongs to the subgroup of client banks.
