= Community West Bancshares =

- Company type: Public
- Traded as: Nasdaq: CWBC
- Industry: Financial services
- Founded: 1996; 30 years ago
- Headquarters: Goleta, California, US
- Key people: William Peeples (chairman); Martin Plourd (president & CEO)
- Operating income: ▲US$ 31.309 million (2012)
- Net income: ▲US$ 8.245 million (2020)
- Total assets: ▲US$ 975.435 million (2020)
- Total equity: ▲US$ 89.0 million (2020)
- Number of employees: 119(2012)
- Website: communitywestbank.com/index.php

Community West Bancshares is a registered bank holding company headquartered in California. It wholly owns Community West Bank under the Bank Holding Company Act.

The company delivers a wide range of commercial and retail financial services such as various loan and deposit products through the operation of the bank. As of December 31, 2020, the Company had $975.4 million in total assets, $89 million in total stockholders' equity and $766.1 million in deposits.

== History ==
Community West Bank was established in 1989 to provide financial services including relationship banking, mortgage lending and SBA lending. On November 26, 1996, Community West Bancshares was incorporated as the bank holding company for Community West Bank.

On December 31, 1997, Community West Bancshares completed the acquisition of Goleta National Bank. On September 1, 2004, the bank changed its name to Community West Bank, also the currently name.

On May 14, 2013, the company declared plans to consolidate the Roseville SBA administrative office functions into the existing loan servicing operations in Goleta.

In April 2024, it was announced that Community West Bancshares had merged its operations with Central Valley Community Bank, totaling 27 locations. The agreement was valued at 143 million dollars.

== Leadership ==
The main managers are listed as follows:

- William Peeples - Independent Chairman of the Board
- Martin Plourd - President, Chief Executive Officer
- Susan Thompson- Chief Financial Officer
