= Loans in Japan =

Personal loans in Japan are provided by three types of providers. First, there are large, traditional banks, with a long service history. Their big advantage is the availability of loans and branches throughout the country. Loans are also provided by specialized consumer credit companies. These are often owned by large, multi-national corporations. For example, Acom, one of the leading consumer credit companies in Japan, is owned by Mitsubishi UFJ Financial Group. The advantage of these loans is their availability, with companies willing to serve customers who do not have a bank loan. The psychology of lending is also a major factor, as many people feel shame after applying for a loan while also often needing a guarantor.

On the Japanese market, there are companies that operate at a so-called gray zone, called sarakin. According to estimations, about 10% of the population borrowed from them and there are about 10,000 such companies on the Japanese market. Interest rates were as high as 29.2%. This rate was capped to 15-20% p.a.

Banks and credit companies use their own credit rating model without assistance from credit bureaus, in contrast with western markets' use of credit scores.

Many regional banks are facing obstacles such as the high risk-aversion of the Japanese population in general, increasing competition and stricter legal frameworks. With a tendency to move to big cities, young people's loans are mostly handled by big banks. This led to the merger of the Bank of Yokohama and Higashi-Nippon Bank.

The last and most recent platform, is P2P lending, a minor platform run by only few operators in Japan.

== List of top 15 biggest retail banks in Japan ==
Rank	Company
1	Mitsubishi UFJ Financial Group
2	Mizuho Financial Group
3	Sumitomo Mitsui Financial
4	Resona Holdings
5	Sumitomo Mitsui Trust
6	Bank of Yokohama
7	Fukuoka Financial Group
8	Chiba Bank
9	Hokuhoku Financial Group
10	Shizuoka Bank
11	Yamaguchi Financial Group
12	Shinsei Bank
13	Joyo Bank
14	Nishi-Nippon City Bank
15	Sapporo Hokuyo

== List of biggest consumer credit companies ==
- Acom - currently a market leader with 713 billion yen in outstanding unsecured loans to consumers
- Aiful - with 216 billion yen in outstanding unsecured loans to consumers
- Takefuji
- Sumitomo Mitsui Banking Corporation - (formerly Promise Co.) – with market name Mobit - with 181 billion yen in outstanding unsecured loans to consumers

== List of biggest P2P platforms ==
- maneo, Inc. - the first P2P platform in Japan, established in 2007. It started as a consumer loan provider, but changed its focus on SME soon. It focused on customer-credit and extended product variety to real-estate collateralized loans.
- AQUSH - second P2P platform in Japan, established in 2009
- SBI Social Lending Co – established in 2008, launched in 2011. This platform focused on collateralized loans too.
- Crowdfunding, Inc., announced in 2013

== Loan demand ==
Demand for loans in Japan is rising again. After a drop in 2010 and 2011 slow recovery become visible again. Concerning year 2014, demand grew slightly especially due to auto loan demand, which driven positive performance of entire market. Performance in first four months of 2014 year was driven by VAT increase that made a high demand for expensive items in order to save taxes.

In June 2015, banking lending grew by 2.6%. Key drivers were regional banks, with growth 3.8% comparing to the same month last year. Major banks grew by 1.2%.

Key product on Japanese market are still credit cards with current boom of contactless payments that allows faster processing of every payment at POS terminal. This trend moves cash payments to card/contactless payments. Nevertheless, Japanese attitude is stable – risk-averse. Japanese are using their credit cards often as free riders – repaying their balance at the end of the month.

== The 2010 Money Lending Business Act ==
The 2010 act caused many small companies on the edge of the market went to bankruptcy. Many other were sold according to decreasing profitability of the business. For example, GE was selling Lake, their consumer-credit division.

== See also ==
- List of banks in Japan
- Economy of Japan
- Loan
- Interest
