= Aomori Michinoku Bank =

Japanese regional bank

The Aomori Michinoku Bank, Ltd. 株式会社青森みちのく銀行
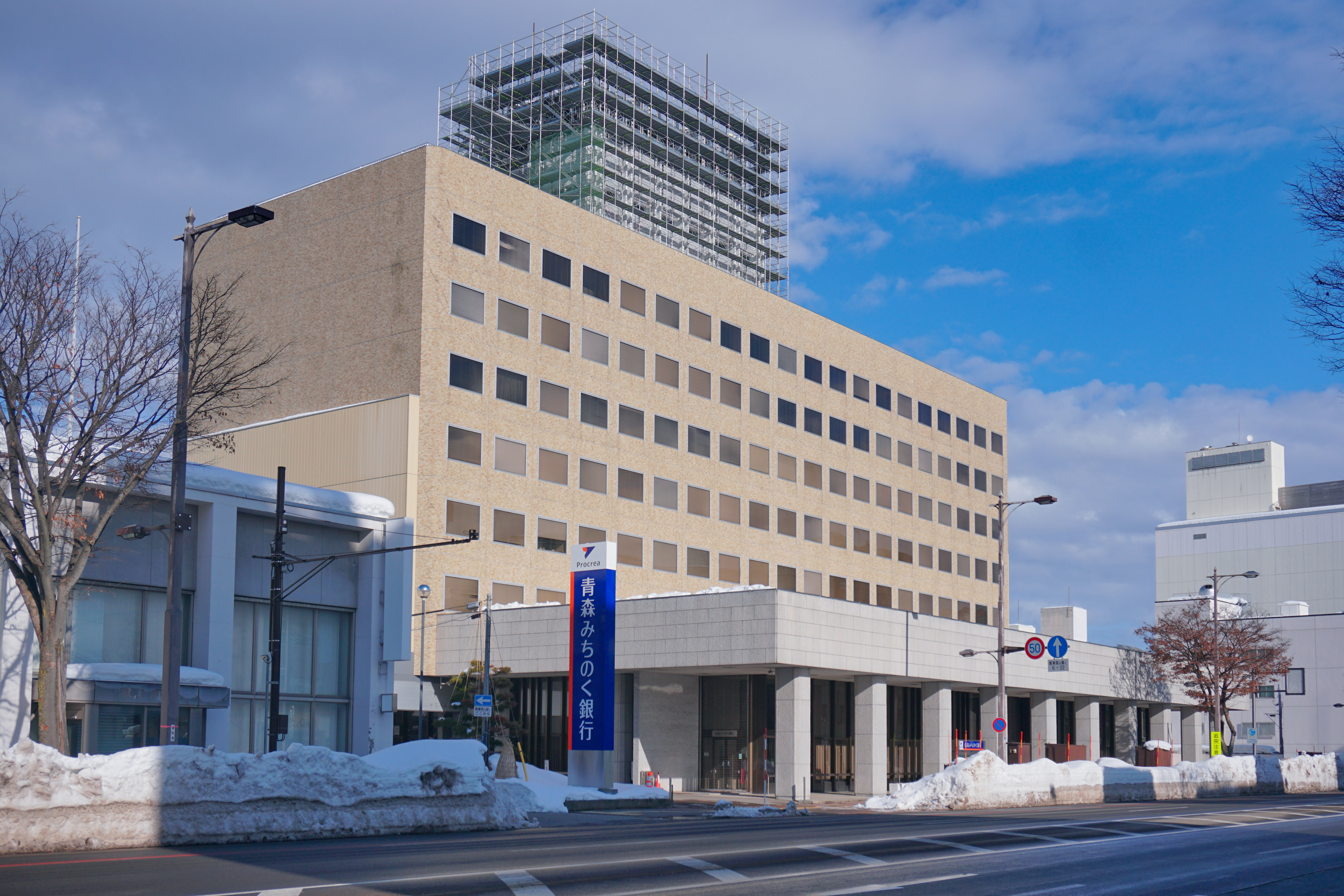
- Aomori Michinoku Bank head office
- Type: Public KK
- Traded as: TYO: 8342
- Industry: Banking; Financial services
- Predecessor: Aomori Bank, Michinoku Bank
- Founded: Hirosaki, Aomori, Japan
- Headquarters: Hashimoto, Aomori, Japan
- Number of locations: 178
- Area served: Tōhoku region, Japan
- Key people: Takayuki Fujisawa; (Chairman of the Board), Keitaro Ishikawa(President and CEO)
- Products: Retail Banking; Payday advance Mortgages; Consumer Finance; Investment Banking
- Net income: 2,166 million yen
- Total assets: 3,681.4 billion yen
- Total equity: 19.5 billion yen
- Number of employees: 2,346
- Subsidiaries: Aogin Koda Co., Ltd. Aogin Card Service Co., Ltd. Michinoku Credit Guarantee Co., Ltd. Michinoku Card Co., Ltd. Seigin Koda Co., Ltd.
- Website: am-bk.co.jp

The Aomori Michinoku Bank, Ltd. (株式会社青森みちのく銀行, kabushiki-gaisha aomori michinoku ginkō) is a Japanese regional bank headquartered in Aomori, Aomori Prefecture, in the Tōhoku region of northern Honshū. The new bank, with antecedent institutions dating back to 1879, was formed on 1 January 2025, when Aomori Bank (continuing) and Michinoku Bank (dissolving) merged their operations. It is the largest (80% share) and only bank based in Aomori Prefecture.

== History ==
Aomori Bank and Michinoku Bank, which had been competing with each other in the prefecture for many years, announced a basic joint agreement in May 2021. They then co-established Procrea Holdings on 1 April 2022. This merger was the first case to be subject to the Special Measures Act on Antimonopoly, which allows for an oligopoly on an exceptional basis. The full merger of the banks was approved on 20 December 2024 and effective from 1 January 2025.

=== Aomori Bank ===
Aomori Bank (株式会社青森銀行, kabushiki-gaisha aomori ginkō) was headquartered in Aomori City and provided financial services for individual and corporate customers, including deposits, loans, securities trading and investment, foreign exchange, and bond underwriting and registration services as well as credit card services. The forerunner of the Aomori Bank was The 59th National Bank (第五十九国立銀行, dai-gojūku kokuritsu ginkō), was established January 20, 1879, in Hirosaki by the former karō of Hirosaki Domain and many former samurai, as a vehicle to invest the stipends issued by the new Meiji government in compensation for their loss in samurai status. The bank was privatized on September 1, 1897, becoming The 59th Bank (第五十九銀行, dai-gojūku ginkō). It opened numerous branch offices throughout Aomori Prefecture in the 1920s and 1930s, but suffered great losses due to the financial crisis following the Great Depression.

On October 1, 1943, it merged with the Hachinohe Bank, Tsugaru Bank, Itayanagi Bank, and the former Aomori Bank to form the new Aomori Bank. The bank was listed on the second section of the Tokyo Stock Exchange from October 1973, and in the first section since 1975. It adopted its logo mark in 1990. Aomori Bank cooperated with other banks in the region (including Iwate Bank and Akita Bank) to create a no-fee ATM network; this has declined due to the departure of one of the participant members, Michinoku Bank, in July 2005.

=== Michinoku Bank ===
Michinoku Bank (株式会社みちのく銀行, kabushiki-gaisha michinoku ginkō) was also headquartered in Aomori City. “Michinoku” is distinctive in that it was the first use of hiragana in the name of a Japanese bank. Michonoku Bank, while focused on the Tōhoku region, had a network of branches and subsidiary companies that expands beyond the region. In Japan, Michinoku had offices in Hokkaidō, Akita, Iwate, Miyagi, and Saitama Prefectures, as well as a branch in Tokyo. It also had branches in China and Russia.

Michinoku Bank traced its origins to 1894, when the Aomori Shogyo Bank was established. In 1976, Seiwa Bank, the successor to the Aomori Shogyo Bank, merged with the Hirosaki Sogo Bank to form the current Michinoku Bank. In January 1980, Michinoku adopted the use of Tom and Jerry as mascots for the bank. These mascots were used until 2004, when the bank decided to stop using the characters in order to rehabilitate its image as the “Tom and Jerry Bank.”

In 1995, Michinoku opened a representative office in Yuzhno-Sakhalin, and four years later established a subsidiary in Moscow. Outside Japan, Michinoku has established Michinoku Finance (Hong Kong) Ltd in Hong Kong, established representative offices in Wuhan and Shanghai, China, and has opened three branches throughout Russia in Moscow, Khabarovsk, and Yuzhno-Sakhalinsk, through a subsidiary corporation, The Michonoku Bank (Moscow), though expansion into Russia has met with some controversy.

As of March 31, 2005:

Assets: approximately 1.8 trillion yen (approximately US$16.3 billion)
Employees: 1,212 (excluding subsidiary corporations)
Branches: 111 (87 in Aomori Prefecture, 21 outside of Aomori, 3 in Russia)
President: Yasuo Sugimoto
Member: Regional Banks Association of Japan

==== Points of interest ====
Kappei Ina, a local radio talk show host, allegedly claimed that when customers withdrew money at Michinoku ATMs, the display did not display the honorific suffix “-sama” that is often used with a company's customers. However, the ATMs used this suffix when customers deposited money. Ina speculated that the reason for this was that those customers that deposited money into the bank were true customers, while those who withdrew money were not customers. One week after this was aired, the Michinoku ATMs displayed the honorific “-sama” suffix.

Michinoku Bank was the bank that was used in the “Anita Scandal.” This scandal involved a Japanese businessman for the Aomori Prefectural Public Housing Corporation who was arrested for funneling funds in excess of 13 million US dollars to his Chilean wife, Anita Alvadoro. Some of this money was used to build a lavish house in Chile. In April 2005, Michinoku came under fire again for losing information over an estimated 1.3 million customers. This prompted a response from the Japanese Financial Services Agency that Michinoku reform its business practices. In May, the company's long-serving president, Kosaburo Daidōji, left the company. Daidōji died on July 21, 2005, at the age of 80.

==== Russian business expansion ====
One distinctive feature of Michinoku was its expansion into the Russian financial market. This has been said to be one legacy from Daidōji. Daidōji was said to have developed an interest in Russia after hearing from his father, who had studied in Europe, say that Russians were different from other Europeans in that they did not discriminate against Japanese. Daidōji had eyed the Russian market since the collapse of the Soviet Union, and finally established the subsidiary on July 7, 1999, becoming the first subsidiary of a Japanese bank to open in Russia. Following this, Michinoku opened a branch in Yuzhno-Sakhalinsk on August 12, 2002, and then a branch in Khabarovsk on July 7, 2003.

Presently, the Russian operations are said to have a scale of around 10 billion yen and around 7,300 personal accounts, including an account held by Russian pop group t.A.T.u. There was some controversy behind this move, however. When Daidōji first initiated the Russian operations, he said that he did not expect to turn profits for 5–10 years. Industry experts and former employees have criticized this move, claiming that “while the reason for the expansion was that the market in the prefecture was saturated, it was a really risky move,” and “the expansion of business into Russia has come at the expense of the development of the firm.” While the Russian subsidiary claimed a 240 million yen in pretax profits in December 2004, Michinoku injected 2.1 billion yen of capital into the subsidiary in August of that year. One former employee said that Michinoku was using capital injections to eliminate the losses by the subsidiary.

== Consolidation ==
The new combined bank has 178 branches in Aomori Prefecture, in addition to others in Hokkaido Prefecture (9 stores), Akita Prefecture (4 stores), Iwate Prefecture (3 stores), Miyagi Prefecture (2 stores), and Tokyo Prefecture (2 stores). Aomori Bank’s credit rating, systems, online banking, cash cards, and passbooks were continued (with rebranding) in the new entity, with Michinoku customers being required to change theirs over.

Consolidated subsidiaries include:

- Aogin Card Service Co., Ltd.
- Aogin Lease Co., Ltd.
- Aogin Credit Guarantee Co., Ltd.
- Michinoku Credit Guarantee Co., Ltd.
- Michinoku Card Co., Ltd.
- Michinoku Lease Co., Ltd.
- Michinoku Debt Collection Co., Ltd.
- Seigin Koda Co., Ltd.

== See also ==
- List of banks in Japan
