= Yamagata Bank =

The Yamagata Bank, Ltd

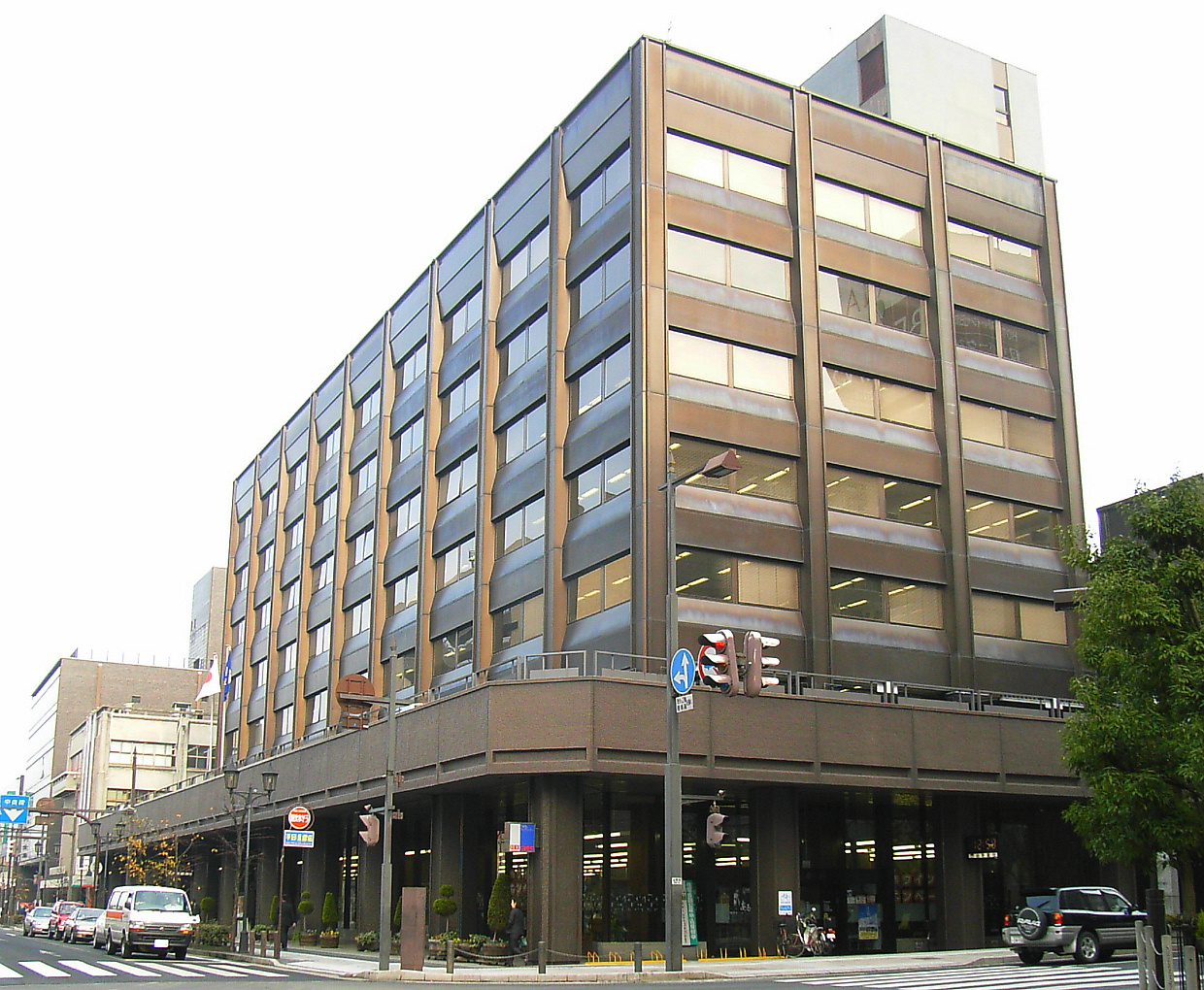
- Company type: Public
- Traded as: TYO: 8344
- Industry: Financial services
- Founded: April 14, 1896
- Headquarters: Yamagata, Yamagata, Japan
- Number of locations: 83 (74 inside Yamagata prefecture)
- Area served: Tōhoku region
- Key people: Kichishige Hasegawa (president)
- AUM: 1.6 trillion yen (approximately 14 billion USD) (2005)
- Number of employees: 1,492
- Website: www.yamagatabank.co.jp

The Yamagata Bank (株式会社山形銀行, Kabushiki-gaisha Yamagata Ginkō) is a Japanese regional bank that is based out of Yamagata city, Yamagata prefecture. Most of the bank's branches are in Yamagata prefecture, or other major cities in the Tohoku region, with a branch in Tokyo as well. The principal shareholders as of March 2005 were The Bank of Tokyo-Mitsubishi, Ltd. and Meiji Yasuda Life Insurance Company.

== History ==
Yamagata Bank can trace its origins to 1878, when The 81st National Bank was founded. In 1897, this bank was later absorbed by the Ryouu Bank, which was established one year earlier. The bank merged with numerous small financial institutions over the first half of the 20th century, and finally changed its name to its present form in 1965.

In October 2005, Yamagata Bank, along with the Saitama Resona Bank, 82 Bank and Hokkoku Bank jointly injected funds into Allegro MicroSystems, an American subsidiary of Sanken Electric Co. Ltd., after Sanken purchased Minnesota-based semiconductor producer PolarFab.

In March 2025, scammers impersonating Yamagata Bank targeted the bank's clients through automated voice calls. One victim, Yamagata Railway, lost 100 million yen in the scheme.

== See also ==
- List of banks
- List of banks in Japan
