= Shonai Bank =

Japanese regional bank

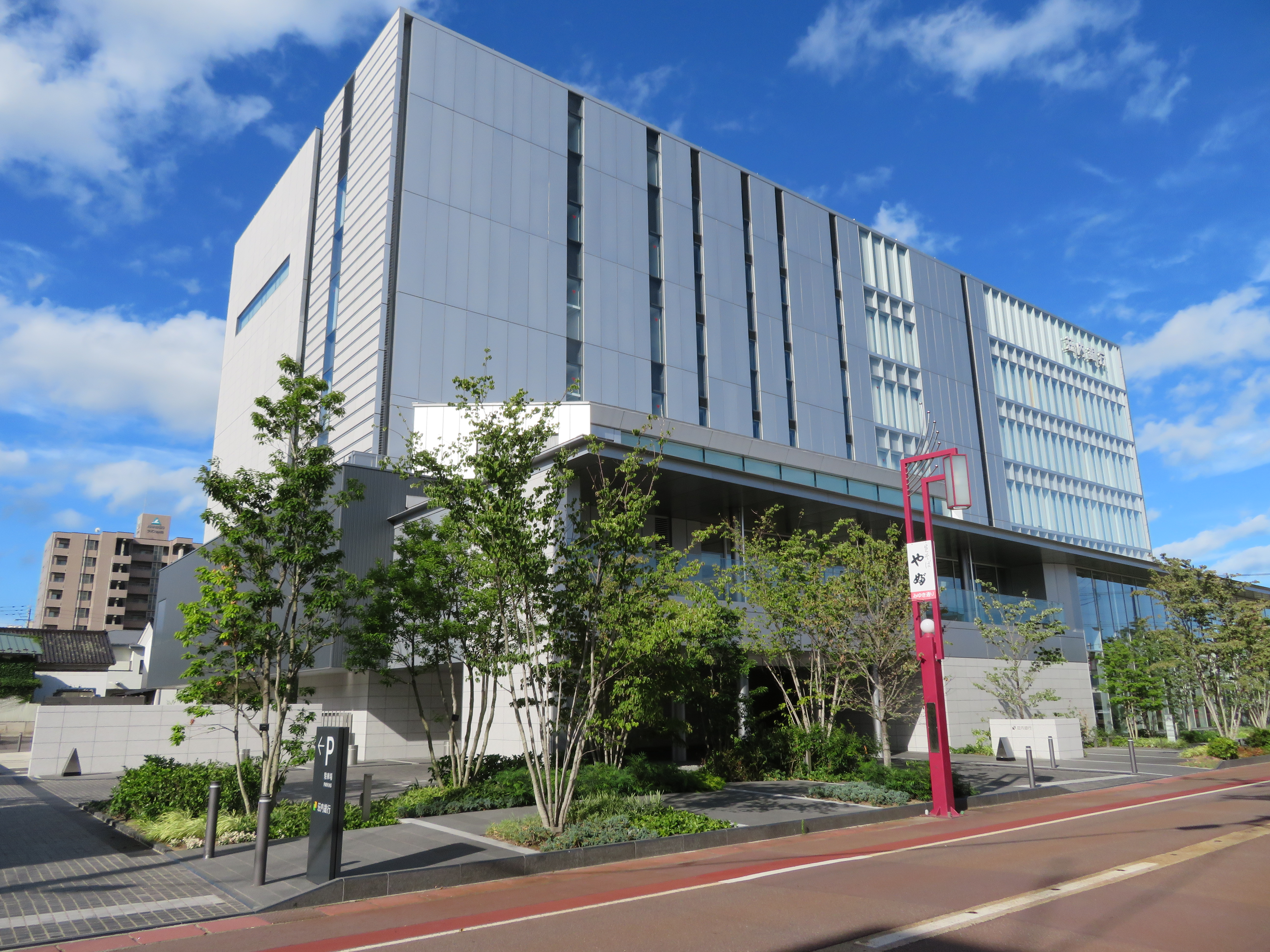
- Company type: Public
- Traded as: TYO: 8347
- Industry: Financial services
- Founded: December 1, 1878
- Headquarters: Tsuruoka, Japan
- Number of locations: 73 branches
- Area served: Tōhoku region
- Key people: Masahiko Matsuta (CEO)
- Revenue: ¥24,376 million (2023)
- Net income: ¥2,390 million (2023)
- Total assets: ¥58,581 million (2023)
- Number of employees: 542 (2023)
- Parent: Fidea Holdings
- Website: www.shonai.co.jp

The Shonai Bank, Ltd. (株式会社 荘内銀行, Kabushikigaisha Shōnai Ginkō) is a Japanese regional bank that is headquartered in Tsuruoka, Yamagata Prefecture. Since 2009, its shares have been 100% owned by Fidea Holdings.

The bank is relatively small, even among Japanese regional banks; it operates primarily in Yamagata, though it also operates branches in Sendai, Tomiya, Fukushima, Akita in neighboring prefectures, as well as in the capital of Tokyo. Unlike common banking practices, Shogin, as the bank is abbreviated in Japanese, maintains full teller-supported services on the weekends and holidays at all its branches.

== History ==
The Shonai Bank can trace its roots to the Meiji era when The 67th National Bank was established in 1878. In 1881, it merged with the 140th National Bank. The bank has merged with other local institutions, adopting its present name in 1941 through a merger with Kazama Bank, Tsuruoka Bank, and Dewa Bank. In 1943, it merged with Shonai Savings Bank.

On March 9, 2004, the government-sponsored Shoko Chukin Bank, a financial institution that provides credit and loans to small and medium-sized enterprises, announced that it would carry out limited business cooperation with the bank in order to serve the small and medium enterprises of that area.

In February 2024, Fidea Holdings announced that a committee had been set up to investigate the merger of the bank with Hokuto Bank, another Fidea owned institution. In November, a merger scheduled for 1 January 2027 was announced, with Shonai continuing and Hokuto dissolving. The new Fidea Bank’s headquarters will be in the Shonai office.
