= City bank (Japan) =

MUFG Bank

Sumitomo Mitsui Bank

Mizuho Bank

Resona Bank

A city bank is a Japanese term (Japanese: 都市銀行 = "Toshi ginkō" or 都銀 = "Togin") for one of the several mega-banks, with their head offices in Tokyo or Osaka, Japan's two largest cities. These banks have wide networks of branches in major cities all over Japan. There are five such banks: MUFG Bank, Sumitomo Mitsui Bank, Mizuho Bank, and two Resona Banks.

The city bank is used in contrast to the regional bank (地方銀行 ="Chihō ginkō" or 地銀 = "Chigin") with its head office in the capital city of each of the 47 prefectures. They mainly serve their prefectural customers.

== See also ==
- Big Four (banking)
- List of banks in Japan#M&A Tree
- Regional bank (Japan)
- Shinkin bank
