= Yamaguchi Bank =

- Industry: Financial services
- Headquarters: Shimonoseki, Japan
- Services: Banking
- Website: www.yamaguchibank.co.jp

The Yamaguchi Bank, Ltd. (山口銀行, Yamguchi ginkō) is a Japanese regional bank, primarily in the Yamaguchi Prefecture. It has 156 branches and offices in Japan and four overseas offices.

The bank's history dates back to 1878 when its predecessor, the Hyakuju (110th) National Bank was founded.

== See also ==
- List of banks
- List of banks in Japan
