= Aichi Bank =

Japanese bank

The Aichi Bank, Ltd. 株式会社愛知銀行
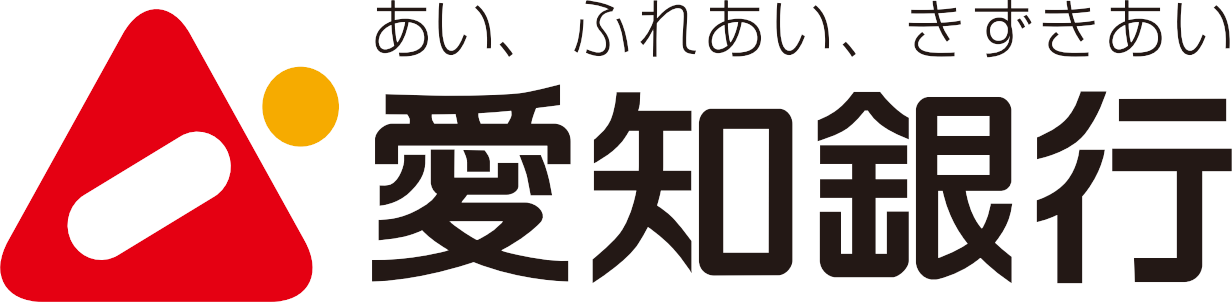

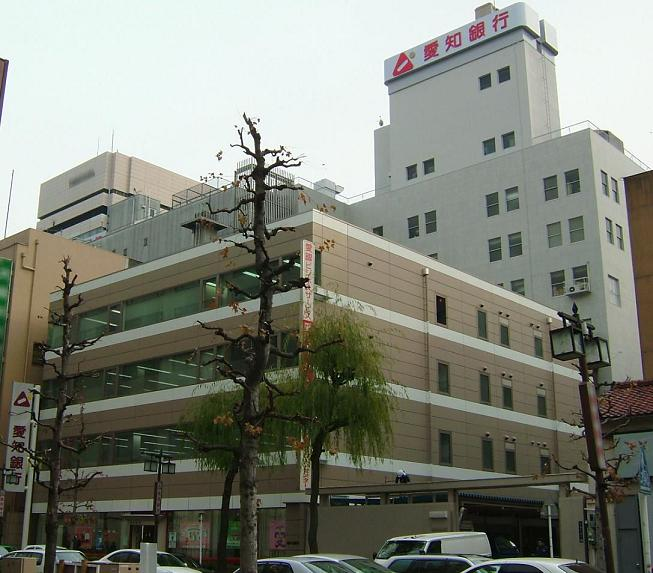
- Aichi Bank head office
- Company type: Public KK
- Traded as: TYO: 8527; NAG: 8527
- Industry: Financial services
- Founded: 1910
- Headquarters: Nagoya, Aichi, Japan
- Services: Banking

Aichi Bank (株式会社愛知銀行, Kabushiki-gaisha Aichi Ginkō) (TYO: 8527) is a Japanese regional bank, listed on the Tokyo Stock Exchange and Nagoya Stock Exchange. It is descended from a company founded in 1910.

== See also ==
- Tokai Bank
- List of banks
- List of banks in Japan
