= 泉州 (disambiguation) =

泉州 may refer to:

- Izumi Province, a country under the Rei system corresponding to the present-day southwestern part of Osaka Prefecture
  - The Senshu Bank, a Japanese bank
- Quanzhou, a city in Fujian, China
