= Chiba Bank =

Japanese regional bank

The Chiba Bank, Ltd.

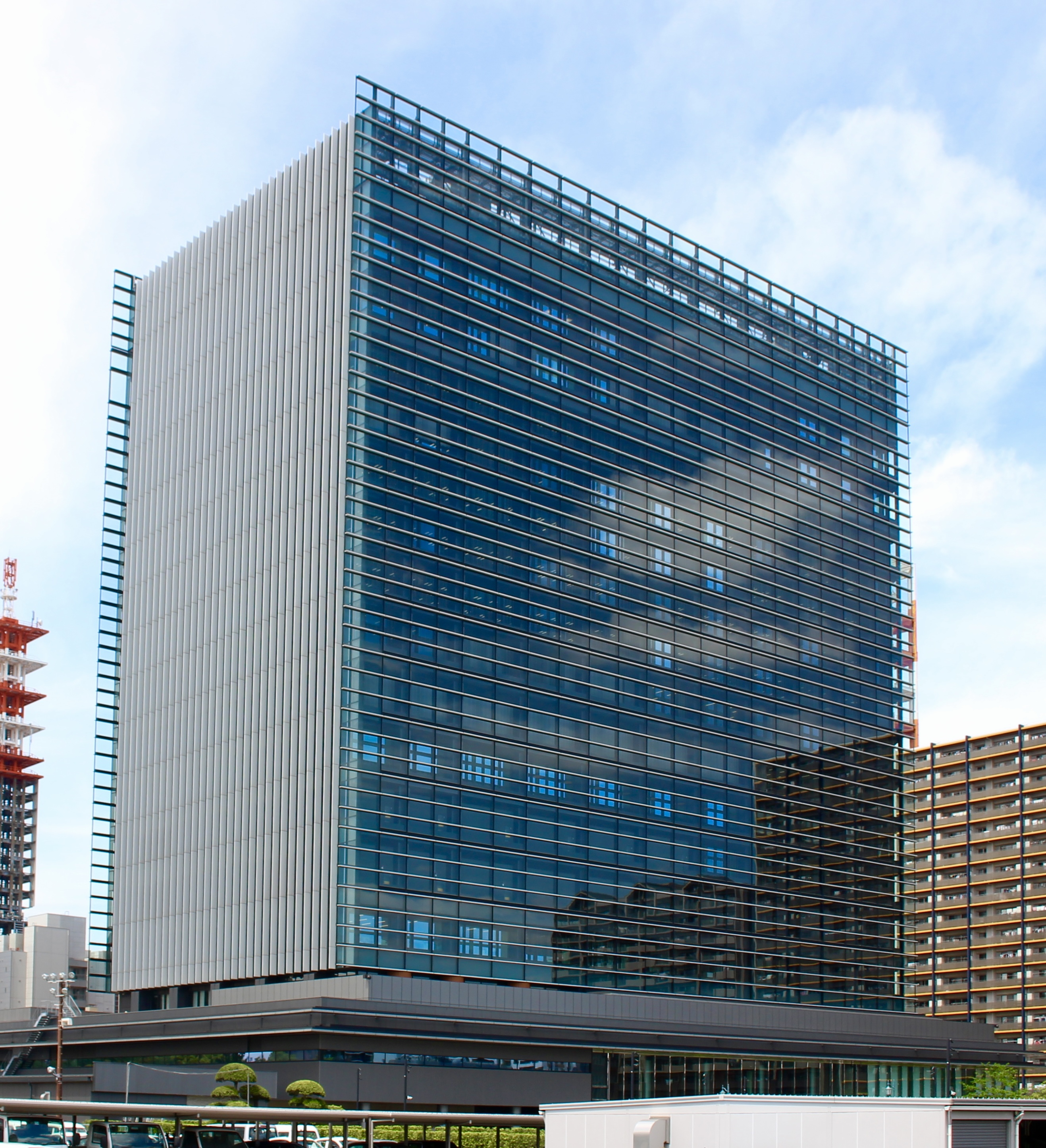
- Headquarters in Chūo-ku, Chiba
- Native name: 株式会社千葉銀行
- Romanized name: Kabushiki-gaisha Chiba Ginkō
- Type: Public
- Traded as: TYO: 8331
- Industry: Financial services
- Founded: 1943; 83 years ago
- Headquarters: Chiba Port, Chūō-ku, Chiba, Chiba Prefecture, Japan
- Area served: Japan
- Key people: Hidetoshi Sakuma (President)
- Products: Retail, corporate, investment and private banking
- Total assets: ¥14,611.9 billion (2017)
- Owner: Nippon Life (3.52%); Dai-ichi Life (3.44%); Oriental Land Company (0.11%); Keisei Electric Railway (0.06%)
- Number of employees: 4,394
- Website: www.chibabank.co.jp

The Chiba Bank, Ltd. (株式会社千葉銀行, Kabushiki-gaisha Chiba Ginkō) is a Japanese regional bank and is the biggest bank in Chiba Prefecture, Japan. Listed on the Nikkei 225, it also has branches in Osaka, New York City, London, and Hong Kong. In 2015, its assets were $106.1 billion.

== History ==
Chiba Bank was established in March 1943.

In June 1998, Standard & Poor's downgraded the bank's credit rating from A-minus to BBB-plus because of negative long-term ratings.

In October 2008, Chiba Bank, jointly with The Daishi Bank and Hokkoku Bank, hired IBM to build a Call Center System common for the three banks. In July 2010, Chiba Bank joined the United Nations Environment Programme Finance Initiative (UNEP FI).

In October 2014, the bank was the first Japanese regional bank to sell dollar bonds, issuing $300 million of notes in US dollars that month.

On February 3, 2025, The Chiba Bank, Ltd. announced the completion of its share repurchase program, which was authorized by the Board of Directors on November 11, 2024.

In March 2026, Chiba Bank and Chiba Kōgyō Bank signed a definitive agreement to establish Chiba Financial Group as their joint holding company, with formation planned for 1 April 2027, subject to shareholder and regulatory approval. On 30 September, the banks approved the share-transfer plan, under which holders of common shares in either bank would receive one holding-company share for each share held.

== Description ==
The bank is headquartered in Chiba Prefecture, which lies adjacent to Japan's capital Tokyo on Tokyo Bay and has one of the most important industrial concentrations anywhere in Japan. The bank's strategy is to expand its branch network into adjacent prefectures along Tokyo-bound commuter rail lines. It is also putting an emphasis on developing southern Chiba Prefecture as a tourist and resort area, particularly around the city of Kamogawa.

Chiba Bank has a 36.6% market share of lending and a 23.0% share of all deposits in the prefecture. Of the bank's network of 173 branches, 154 are within Chiba Prefecture. Chiba Bank is the third-largest of Japan's 64 regional banking groups in terms of total assets. As of March 2008, it had total assets of ¥9.8 trillion and a loan portfolio topping ¥6.6 trillion, which also made it one of the world's 200 largest banks. The bank is one of the few banks that discloses net interest margins (NIM) on their lending.
