= Bank of Iwate =

Japanese regional bank

The Bank of Iwate Co Ltd 岩手銀行

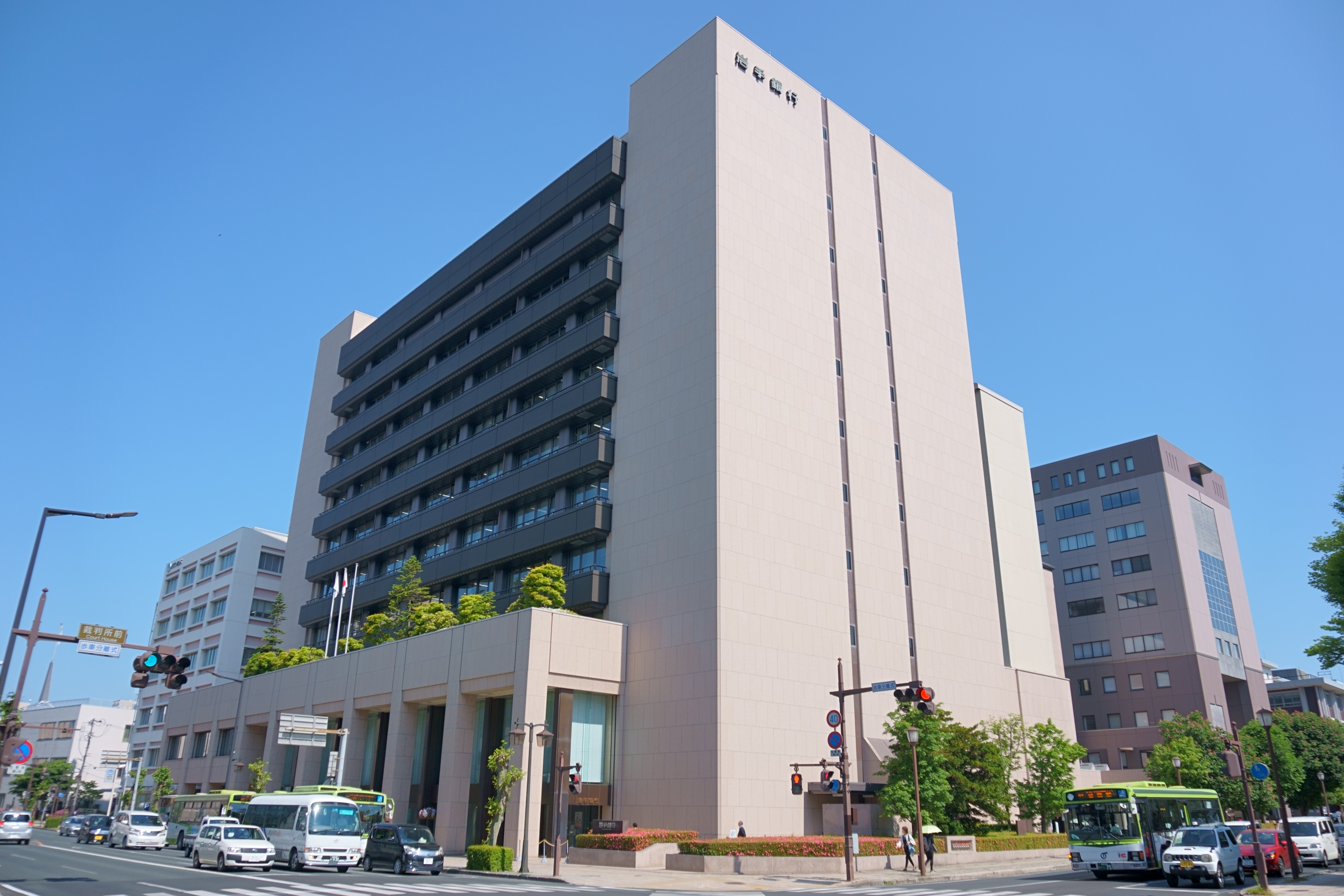
- head office of the Bank of Iwate
- Type: Public (TYO: 8345)
- Industry: Banking financial services
- Predecessor: Iwate Shokusan Bank (May 2, 1932)
- Headquarters: Morioka, Iwate, Japan
- Number of locations: 109
- Area served: Tōhoku region, Japan
- Key people: Masahiro Takahashi (President)
- Products: Retail Banking; Payday advance Mortgages; Consumer Finance; Investment Banking
- Revenue: ▲US$427 million (2016)
- Net income: ▲US$97 million (2016)
- Total assets: ▲US$28,3 Billion (2016)
- Number of employees: 1,492
- Subsidiaries: Iwagin Lease Data Co; Iwagin Business Service Co Ltd; Iwagin Daisy Card Service Co Ltd
- Website: Iwate Bank homepage

The Bank of Iwate, Limited (株式会社岩手銀行, Kabushiki-gaisha Iwate Ginkō) is a Japanese regional bank that is based out of Morioka, the capital of Iwate prefecture in the Tohoku region. The Morioka branch building, the site of the old Morioka Bank, is a historic landmark in the prefecture. The bank has branches in Sendai and Hachinohe; unfavorable business conditions forced the bank to close a branch in Sapporo.

== History ==
The bank was created from capital from Iwate prefecture in the wake of a 1932 banking crisis that affected other regional banks, including the Morioka Bank. Originally established as the Iwate Shokusan Bank, the bank changed its name to its current form in 1960.

During the bubble economy era of the late 1980s, the Bank of Iwate was known for its sound lending practices, and as a result, was relatively stable during the period following the collapse of the bubble. While the bank has dropped in its rankings in recent years, it is said to maintain high standards. The bank has recently diversified, offering insurance and securities services for customers.

On October 2, 2026, Bank of Iwate, Akita Bank and Procrea Holdings, the parent company of Aomori Michinoku Bank, announced that they would begin discussions on a business integration targeting April 2028. The lenders cited regional population decline and increasing investment requirements as reasons for the proposed integration.

== Financial issues ==
The Bank of Iwate faces competition from national banks that are continuing to expand business services in Morioka, including the Bank of Tokyo-Mitsubishi, and the Sumitomo Mitsui Banking Corporation. One long-term issue that will face Japan's regional banks will be the level of competition from Japan Post, the Japanese postal system which is also the world's largest savings institution, by assets, when it is privatized in 2007.
