= Chiba Kōgyō Bank =

Japanese regional bank

Chiba Kōgyō Bank Ltd
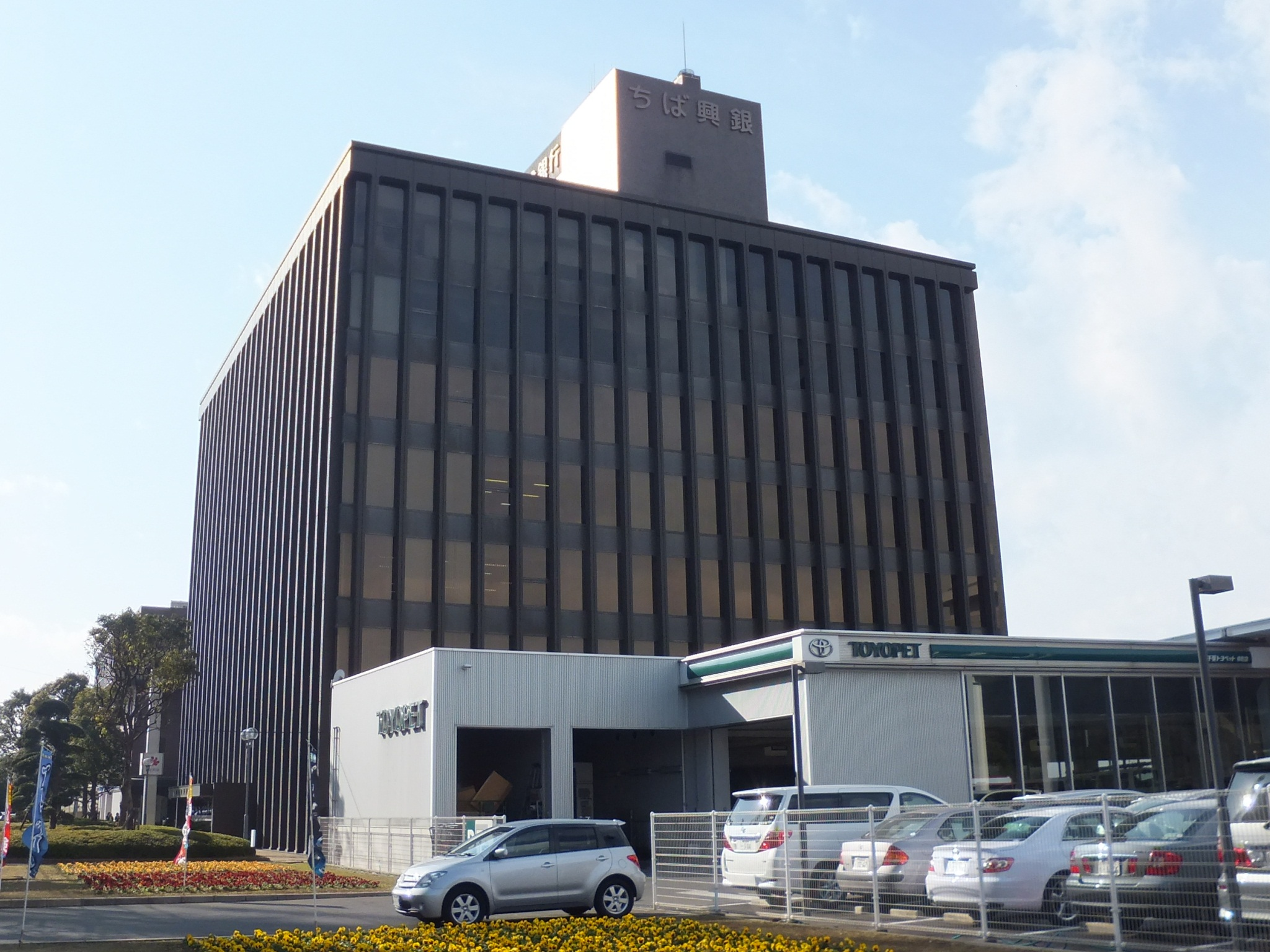
- Head Office Sales Department (December 2011)
- Native name: 千葉興業銀行
- Industry: Financial services
- Founded: 1952
- Headquarters: 2-1-2, Saiwai-cho, Mihama-ku, 261-0001 Chiba, Japan
- Key people: Shunichi Aoyagi (CEO)
- Number of employees: about 1490
- Website: www.chibakogyo-bank.co.jp

The Chiba Kōgyō Bank is a Japanese regional bank founded in 1952 and located in Chiba City, the capital of Chiba Prefecture.

In 2016, the bank was number 1935 on the list of Forbes Global 2000 biggest public companies.

== History ==
- 1952 - Chiba Kogyo Bank was founded on 18 January
- 1972 - in March the current head office was completed and in September the bank was listed on the Tokyo Stock Exchange, part 2
- 1973 - in August introduction to the Tokyo Stock Exchange, part 1
- 1974 - in May, the administrative center was completed
- 1977 - in April started the Foreign exchange online operation and the Chiba Warranty Service (now Chiba Kogyo Card Service)
- 1983 - introduced the Chiba general lease.
- 1986 - started the Chiba Kogyo Business Service
- 1991 - founded the Chiba Nikko Bank Computer Software
- 2004 - accounting system moved to the NTT DATA Regional Bank Collaboration Center
- 2012 - started the partnership to share ATMs with the Joyo Bank, Kanto Tsukuba Bank, Tokyo Tomin Bank, Musashino Bank, Yamanashi Chuo Bank and Bank of Yokohama.
- 2009 - merge of the Chiba Guarantee Service and the Chiba Bank UCS Card
- 2013 - public repayment of ¥60 billion of public funds.

== See also ==
- List of banks in Asia
