= Amagasaki Shinkin Bank =

Regional bank in Japan

Amagasaki Shinkin Bank 尼崎信用金庫
- Industry: Financial services
- Founded: 1921
- Headquarters: Amagasaki, Japan
- Area served: Hyogo Prefecture, Osaka Prefecture
- Services: Banking
- Number of employees: 1,474 (as of 31 March 2015)
- Website: amashin.co.jp

Amagasaki Shinkin Bank (尼崎信用金庫, Amagasaki Shinyō Kinko) is a Japanese regional bank based in Amagasaki, in Hyogo Prefecture, Japan. It was founded in 1921. As of 31 March 2015, the bank has 94 branches in Osaka and Hyogo Prefectures.

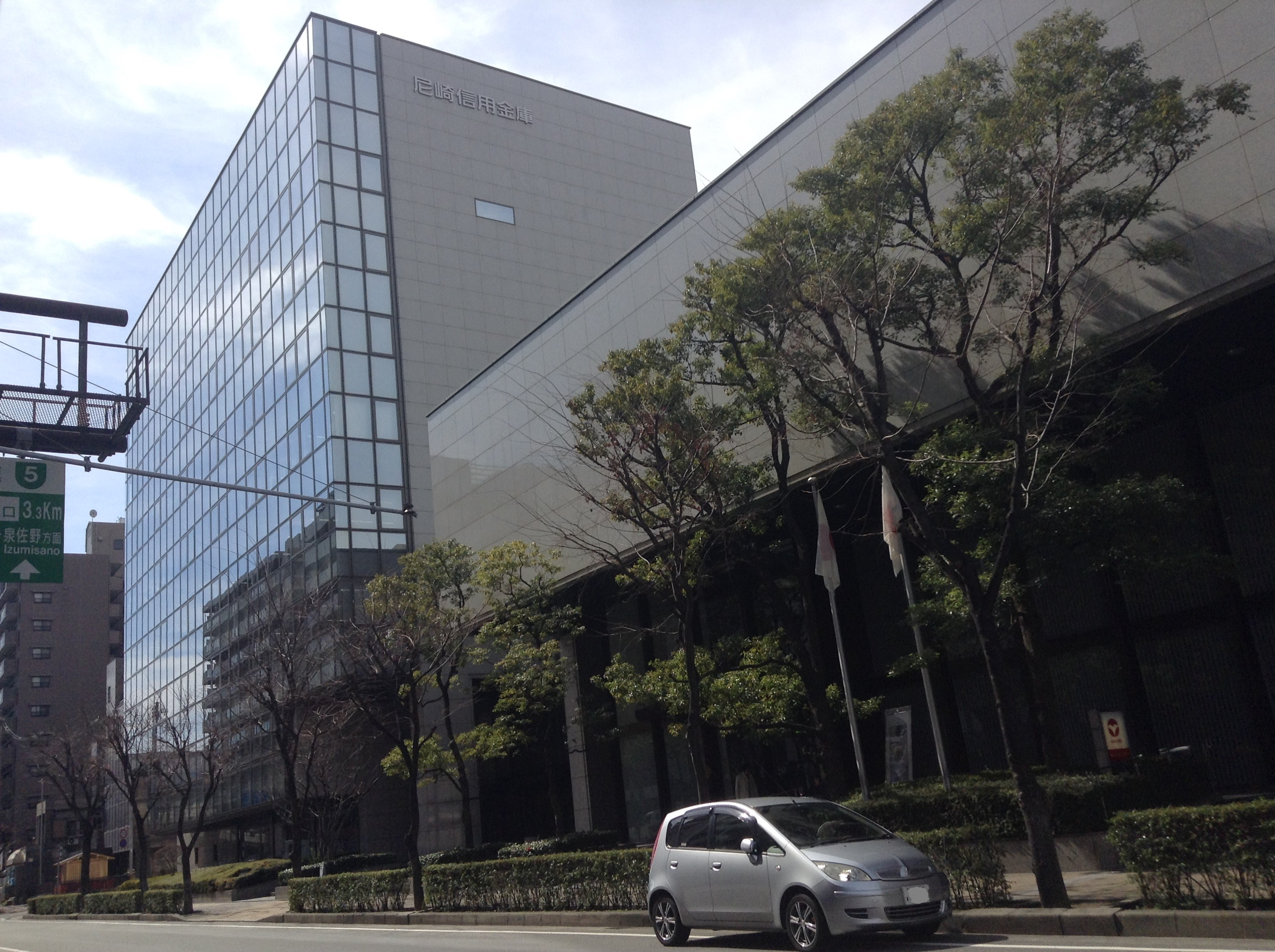
The head office of The Amagasaki Shinkin Bank, 2014.

== See also ==
- List of banks
- List of banks in Japan
