= Nanto Bank =

Regional bank in Nara Prefecture, Japan

The Nanto Bank, Ltd. 株式会社南都銀行
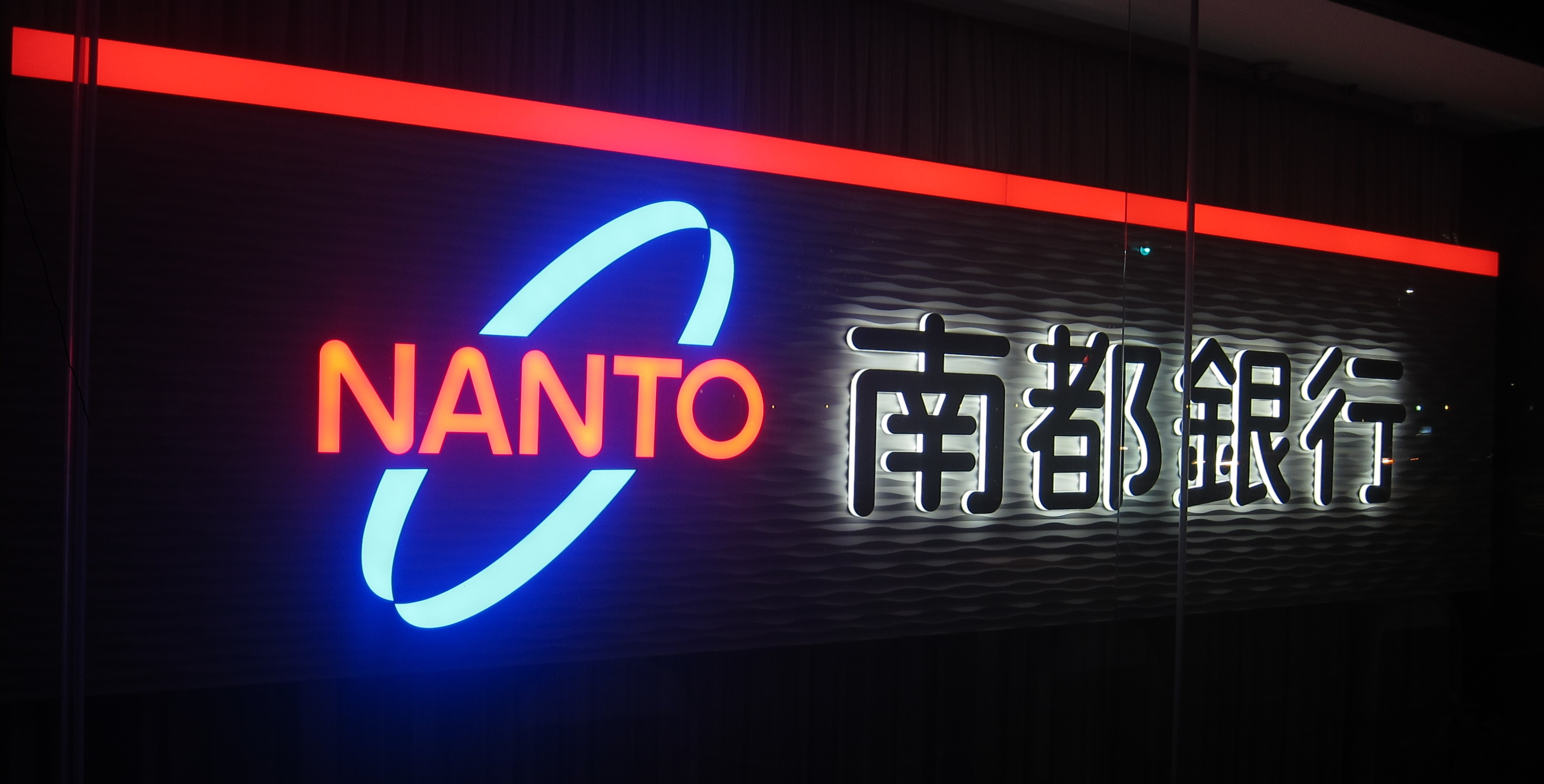
- Company type: Public (TYO: 8367) (OSE: 8367)
- Industry: Financial services
- Predecessor: The Sixty-Eighth Bank, Ltd. The Yoshino Bank, Ltd. The Yagi Bank, Ltd. The Gose Bank, Ltd.
- Founded: June 1, 1934
- Headquarters: Nara City, Nara, Japan
- Number of locations: 136 branches 2 rep. offices(as of March 31, 2009)
- Area served: Central Japan, Tokyo, Hong Kong, and Shanghai
- Key people: Yasuo Ueno (President)
- Services: Personal Banking; Corporate Banking
- Revenue: ¥81.869 billion (2015)
- Operating income: ¥18.012 billion (2015)
- Net income: ¥9.874 billion (2015)
- Total assets: ¥5.329 trillion (as of March 31, 2015)
- Total equity: ¥186.4 billion (as of March 31, 2015)
- Number of employees: 2,697 (as of March 31, 2015)
- Subsidiaries: Nanto Credit Guarantee Co., Ltd. Nanto Lease Co., Ltd. Nanto Computer Service Co., Ltd. Nanto DC Card Co., Ltd. Nanto Card Services Co., Ltd. Nanto Estate Co., Ltd. Nanto Business Service Co., Ltd. Nanto Staff Service Co., Ltd. Nangin Agency Co., Ltd. Nanto Investment Management Co., Ltd.
- Website: http://www.nantobank.co.jp

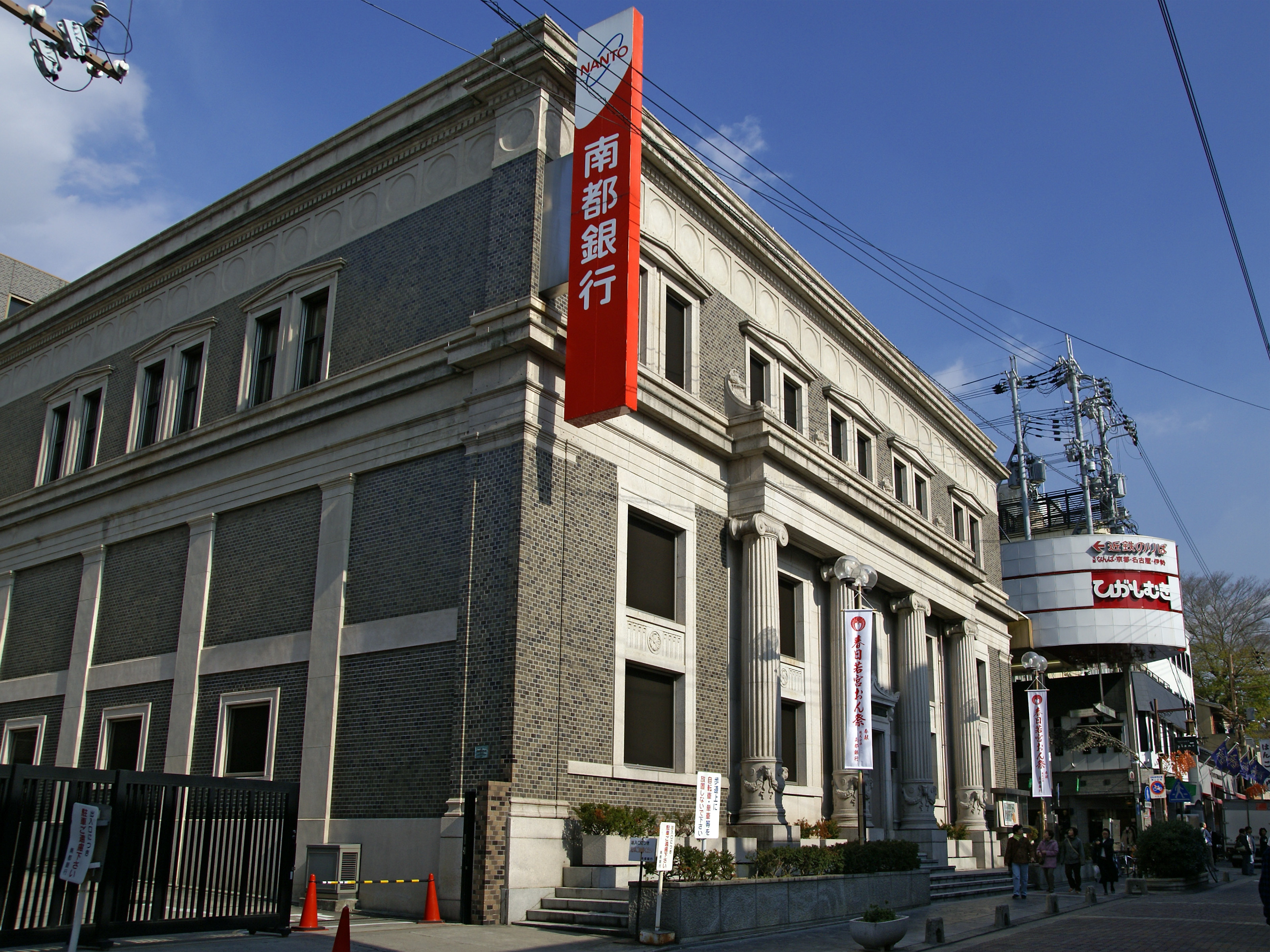
Headquarters

The Nanto Bank, Ltd. (株式会社南都銀行, Nanto ginkō) is a Japanese regional bank that mainly operates in Nara Prefecture, Japan. The bank, established in June 1934, has 136 domestic branches in Nara, Osaka, Kyoto, Hyogo, Mie, Wakayama, and Tokyo as well as representative offices in Hong Kong and Shanghai, China.

The Nanto Bank commands 48.4% of all deposits and 50.5% of all lending in Nara Prefecture that mainly serves as bedroom communities for neighboring Osaka, with a population of 1,421,000. The total assets of the bank reached 4.61 trillion yen as of March 2009.

The bank provides general banking services such as deposits, loans, and exchange transactions, as well as other financial services including securities brokerage, letter of credit, credit cards, leasing, and software development. Due to the recent shrinking tendency in population in Nara, the strategy of the Nanto Bank is to seek growth in neighboring Osaka while providing wealth management products to the retail banking market in Nara.

India's largest power producer NTPC has agreed a loan of Rs 3,582 crore with Nanto Bank in 2020. The loan funds are for Flue Gas Desulphurization (FGD) and renewable energy projects.

Nanto Bank has initiated structural reforms in 2020, under which it plans to reduce the number of branches by about 30 per cent in 10 years and also reduce the number of employees to about 2,000 (from 2,500) in five years.

== Major Stockholders ==
As of March 31, 2015, the top 10 stockholders of Nanto Bank are:

Stockholders	Number of shares (thousands)	Percentage (%)
The Bank of Tokyo-Mitsubishi UFJ, Ltd.	10,283	3.77
Japan Trustee Services Bank, Ltd.	8,991	3.29
Nippon Life Insurance Co.	8,531	3.12
Meiji Yasuda Life Insurance Co. (standing proxy: Trust & Custody Services Bank, Ltd.)	8,430	3.09
The Nanto Bank Employees’ Shareholders Association	7,940	2.91
Sumitomo Life Insurance Co. (standing proxy: Japan Trustee Services Bank, Ltd.)	5,420	1.98
DMG MORI Co., Ltd.	4,766	1.74
Kitamura Forestry Co., Ltd.	4,063	1.48
The Shiga Bank, Ltd. (standing proxy: Trust & Custody Services Bank, Ltd.)	3,204	1.17
The Master Trust Bank of Japan, Ltd.	3,094	1.13
Total	64,724	23.72
