= Hachijuni Bank =

Regional bank in Japan

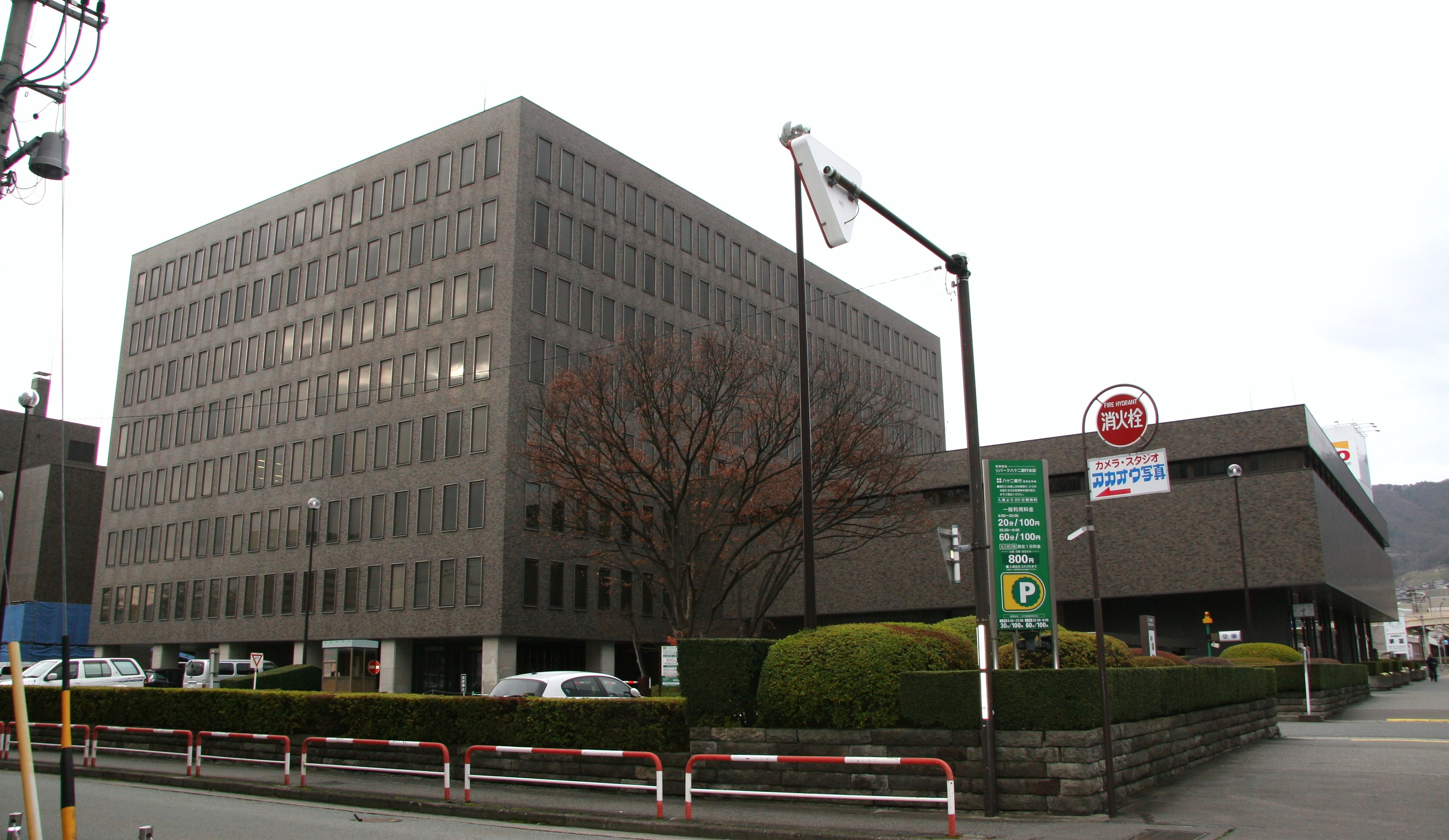
Hachijuni Bank head office

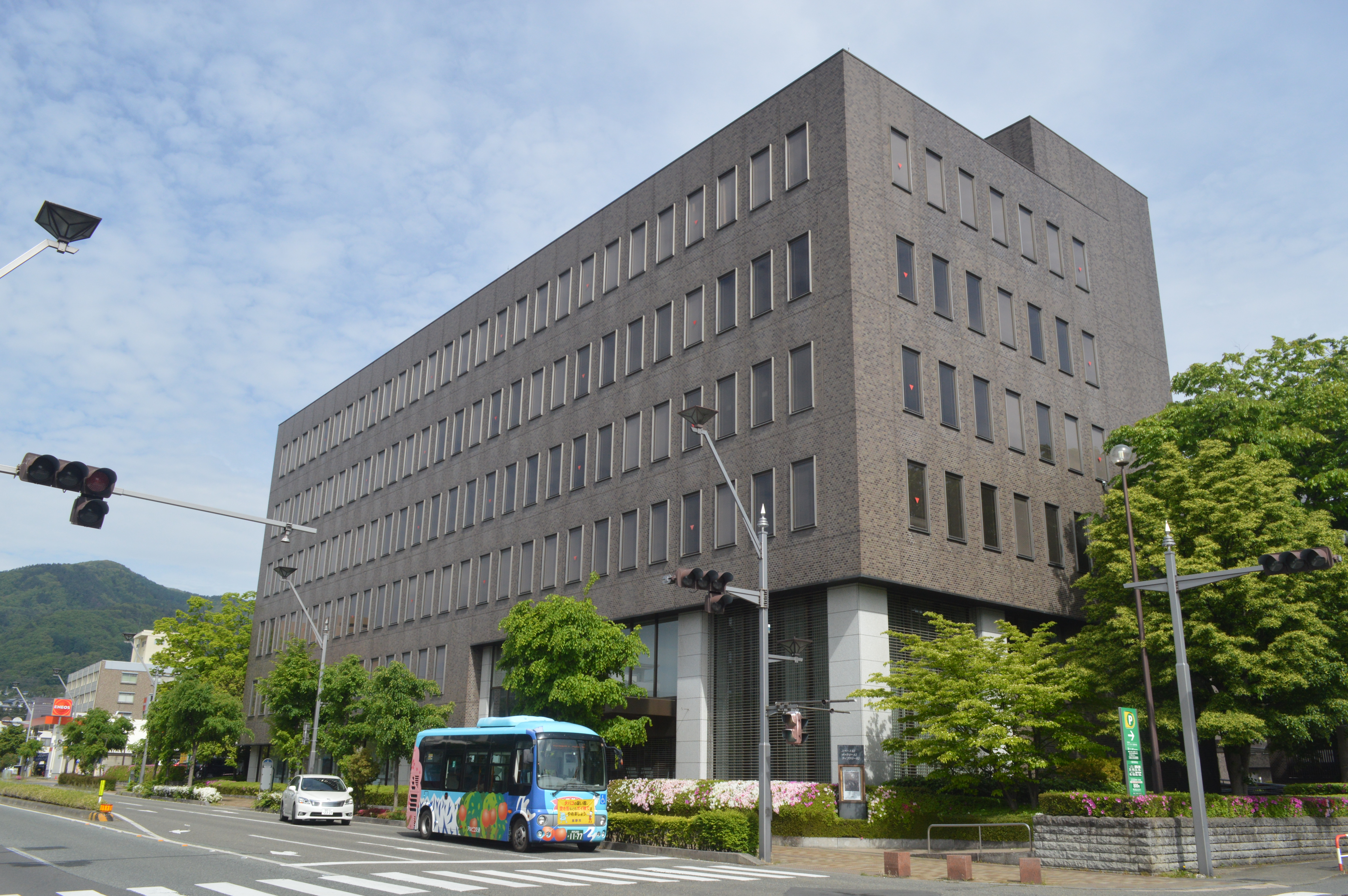
Hachijuni Bank head office annex

Hachijuni Bank (Japanese: 八十二銀行) is a Japanese regional bank with its head office in Nagano City, Nagano Prefecture, Japan. Its name means the 82nd Bank, as it was established in 1931 as the merger of 19th NationalBank, established in 1877 in Ueda, Nagano, and 63th National Bank, established in 1888 in Matsushiro, Nagano, reflecting the good banker's arithmetic sense of 19 plus 63 equals 82. The bank moved its head office to the current address of Nakagosho Okda-machi (中御所岡田町, 36°38′38.6″N 138°10′59.5″E), Nagano City, in 1969.

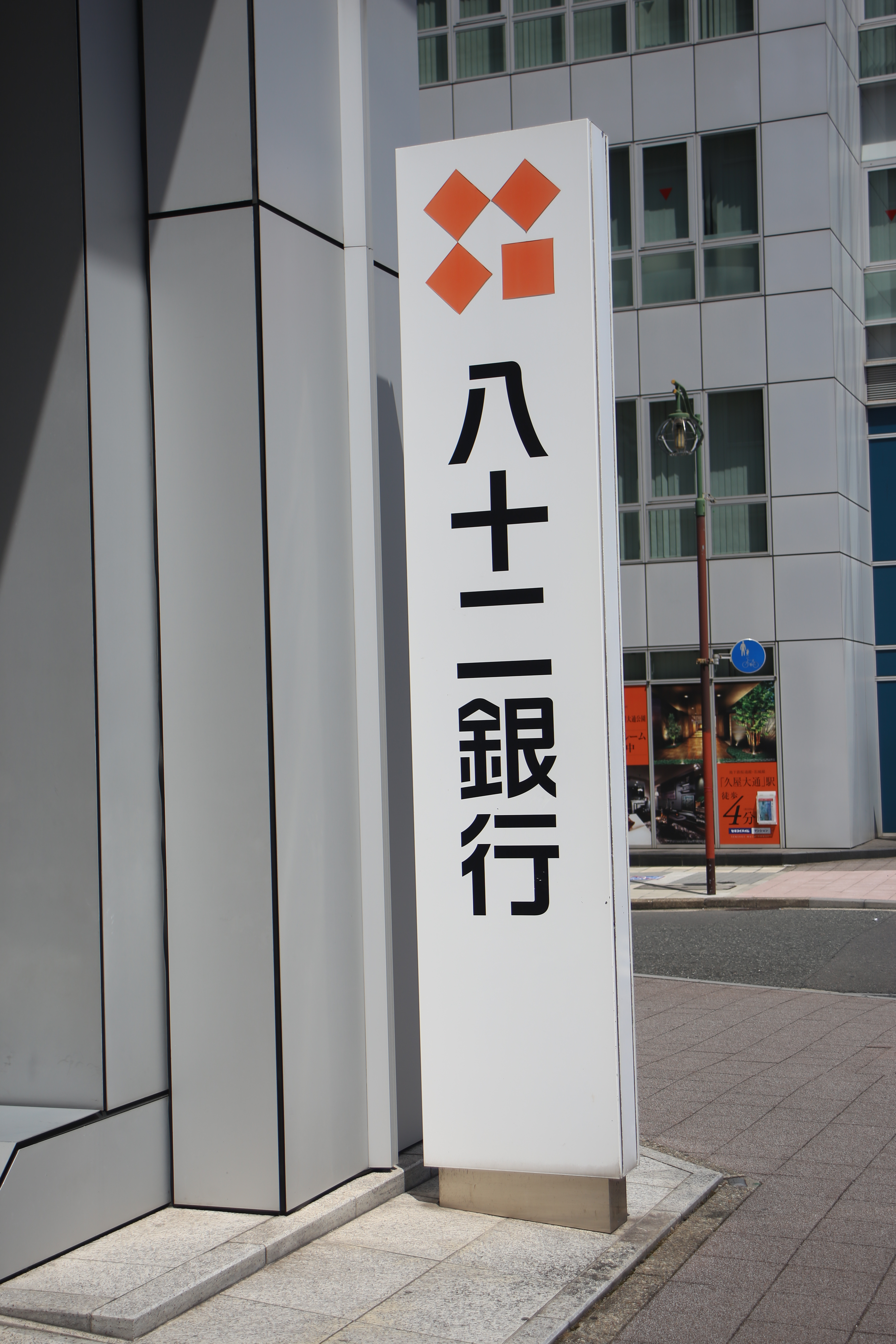
Nagoya Branch, Aichi Prefecture

Hachijuni Bank has its branch offices not only in the major cities of Nagano Prefecture, but also in other major cities of Japan's Central, Kanto and Kansai Regions. It also has its overseas branch in Hong Kong, and business offices in Bangkok, Shanghai and Singapore.

== See also ==
- Economy of Nagano Prefecture
- Economy of Nagano City
