= Bank of the Ryukyus =

- Native name: 琉球銀行
- Romanized name: Ryukyu Ginko KK
- Company type: Public company (K.K.)
- Industry: Banking, financial services
- Founded: May 1, 1948; 78 years ago
- Headquarters: Naha, Okinawa, Japan
- Area served: Okinawa Prefecture
- Key people: Yasushi Kawakami (CEO)
- Revenue: ¥ 63,027 million (2017)
- Net income: ¥ 8,884 million (2017)
- Total assets: ¥ 23.587 billion (2017)
- Total equity: ¥ 1.179 billion (2017)
- Members: 1,285 (2018)
- Rating: JCR: A (7/2018)
- Website: Official website

Bank of The Ryukyus, Limited (株式会社琉球銀行, Kabushiki gaisha Ryūkyū Ginkō) is a Japanese regional bank serving Okinawa Prefecture in Japan.

== History ==
It was founded in 1948 by order of the U.S. military administration of Okinawa to serve as a central bank for occupied Okinawa, and was originally modeled after the Federal Reserve System of the United States and the Central Bank of the Philippines. During the U.S. administration, it was empowered to issue currency and oversee the financial administration of Okinawa in addition to serving as a commercial and retail bank. Following the repatriation of Okinawa in 1972, it was reorganized as a regional bank. It had an initial public offering on the Tokyo Stock Exchange in 1983.
