= Tohoku Bank =

The Tohoku Bank Ltd 青森銀行

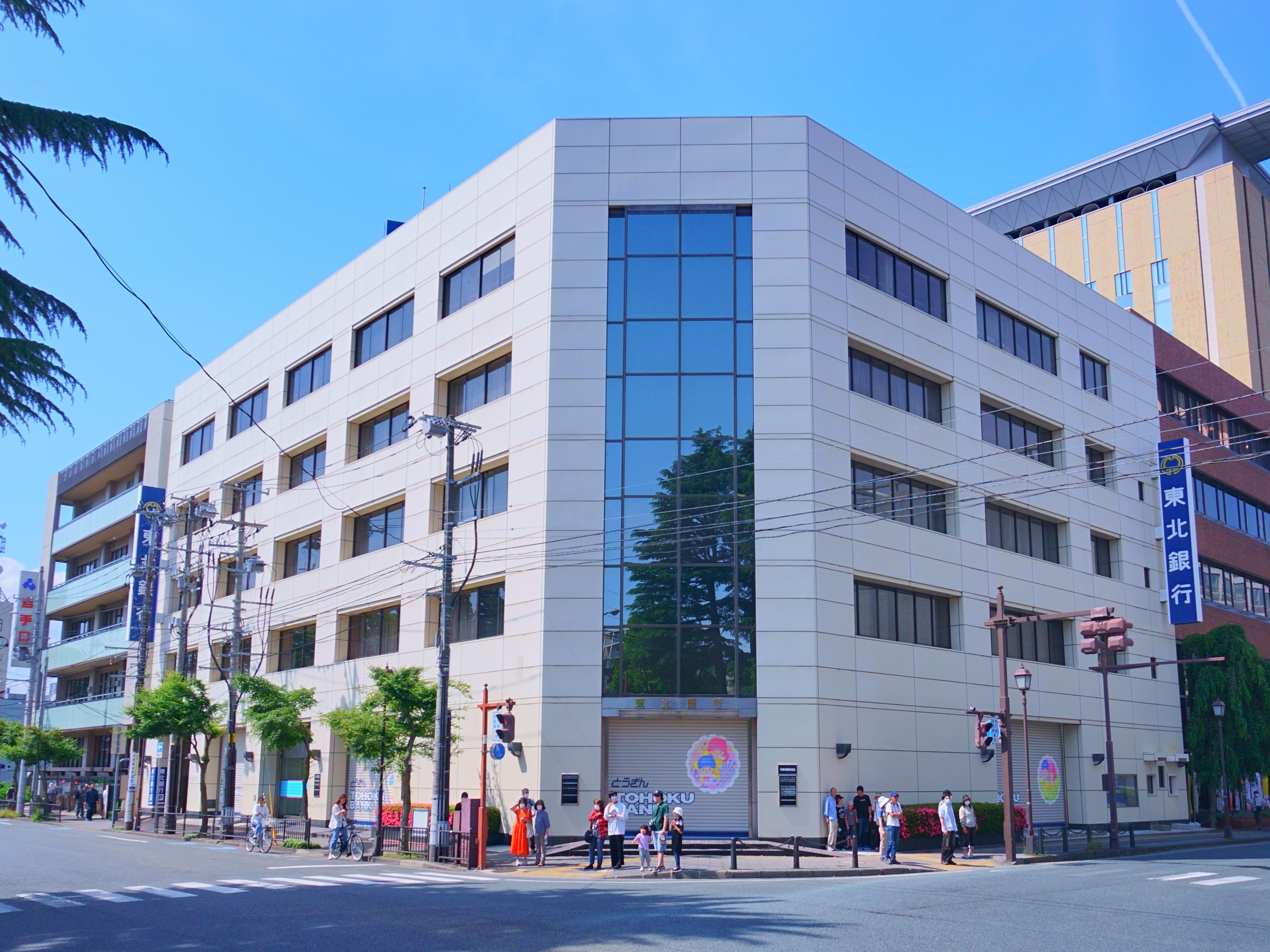
- Type: Public (TYO: 8349)
- Industry: Banking; Financial services
- Founded: November 1, 1950
- Headquarters: Morioka, Iwate, Japan
- Number of locations: 48
- Area served: Tōhoku region, Japan
- Key people: Shin Asanuma (President)
- Products: Retail Banking; Payday advance Mortgages; Consumer Finance; Investment Banking
- Net income: 684 million yen
- Total assets: 24.4 billion yen
- Number of employees: 580
- Website: Tohoku Bank homepage

The Tohoku Bank Limited (株式会社東北銀行, Kabushiki-gaisha Tōhoku Ginkō) is a Japanese regional bank that is based out of Morioka, the capital of Iwate prefecture in the Tohoku region of Japan. It is one of the smallest regional banks in Japan.

== History ==
The bank was created in November, 1950.
