= Regional bank (Japan) =

Bank of Yokohama, an example.

Hachijuni Bank, an example

A regional bank (chihō ginkō 地方銀行 or chigin 地銀) is a Japanese term for one of the 100 banks who are members of the Regional Banks Association of Japan (zenkoku chihōginkō kyōkai 全国地方銀行協会). They usually have their head office in the capital city of one of the 47 prefectures of Japan, serving mainly its local prefectural customers. Historically, regional banks in the same areas tend to merge over time, reducing overheads while increasing their strength and regional footprint.

== Details ==
As of January 2025, there are 61 main regional banks. There is also a category known as "regional banks II", numbering 39 additional institutions (down from 68 in 1990), most of whom "have converted from mutual savings banks to ordinary commercial banks".

The regional bank is in contrast to a city bank (toshi ginkō 都市銀行 or togin 都銀) or "megabank" with its head office in metropolitan Tokyo, Nagoya, or Osaka. Each of these banks have a large footprint and a wide network of branches in the larger cities of Japan. They are also different to a shinkin bank (shin-yō kinko 信用金庫) which are cooperative regional financial institutions serving small and medium enterprises and local residents.

Examples of regional bank mergers include Senshu Bank and Ikeda Bank which merged to form Senshu Ikeda Bank in May 2010. Another is Kagoshima Bank, which integrated operations with Higo Bank (in Kumamoto City) in October 2015 under Kyushu Financial Group. In January 2025, Aomori Bank and Michinoku Bank merged their operations, creating the Aomori Michinoku Bank (株式会社青森みちのく銀行). A future merger between Shonai Bank and Hokuto Bank (into Fidea Bank) is planned for January 2027.

== List ==
This is a partial list of the 100 current regional banks by broad geographic area (from north to south):

- Hokkaido
  - Hokkaido Bank
- Tōhoku region
  - 77 Bank; Akita Bank; Aomori Michinoku Bank; Bank of Iwate; Fukushima Bank; Hokuto Bank; Shonai Bank; Toho Bank; Tohoku Bank; Yamagata Bank
- Kantō region
  - Ashikaga Bank; Bank of Yohohama; Chiba Bank; Chiba Kōgyō Bank; Gunma Bank; Joyo Bank; Kanto Tsukuba Bank; Kiraboshi Bank; Mushashino Bank; Saitama Bank; Tokyo Star Bank; Tsukuba Bank
- Chūbu region
  - Aichi Bank; Bank of Toyama; Daishi Hokuetsu Bank; Fukui Bank; Hachijuni Bank; Hokkoku Bank; Hokuriku Bank; Juroku Bank; Ogaki Kyoritsu Bank; Shimizu Bank; Shizuoka Bank; Suruga Bank; Yamanashi Chuo Bank
- Kansai region
  - Amagasaki Shinkin Bank; Bank of Kyoto; Hyakugo Bank; Kansai Mirai Bank; Kiyo Bank; Nanto Bank; Sanjusan Bank; Senshu Ikeda Bank; Shiga Bank; Tajima Bank
- Chūgoku region
  - Chugoku Bank; Hiroshima Bank; San-in Godo Bank; Tottori Bank; Yamaguchi Bank
- Shikoku
  - Awa Bank; Hyakujushi Bank; Iyo Bank; Shikoku Bank
- Kyūshū & Okinawa
  - Bank of Okinawa; Bank of the Ryukyus; Chikuho Bank; Fukuoka Bank; Higo Bank; Juhachi-Shinwa Bank; Kagoshima Bank; Kitakyushu Bank; Miyazaki Bank; Nishi-Nihon City Bank; Oita Bank; Saga Bank
