= Shikoku Bank =

Japanese Bank

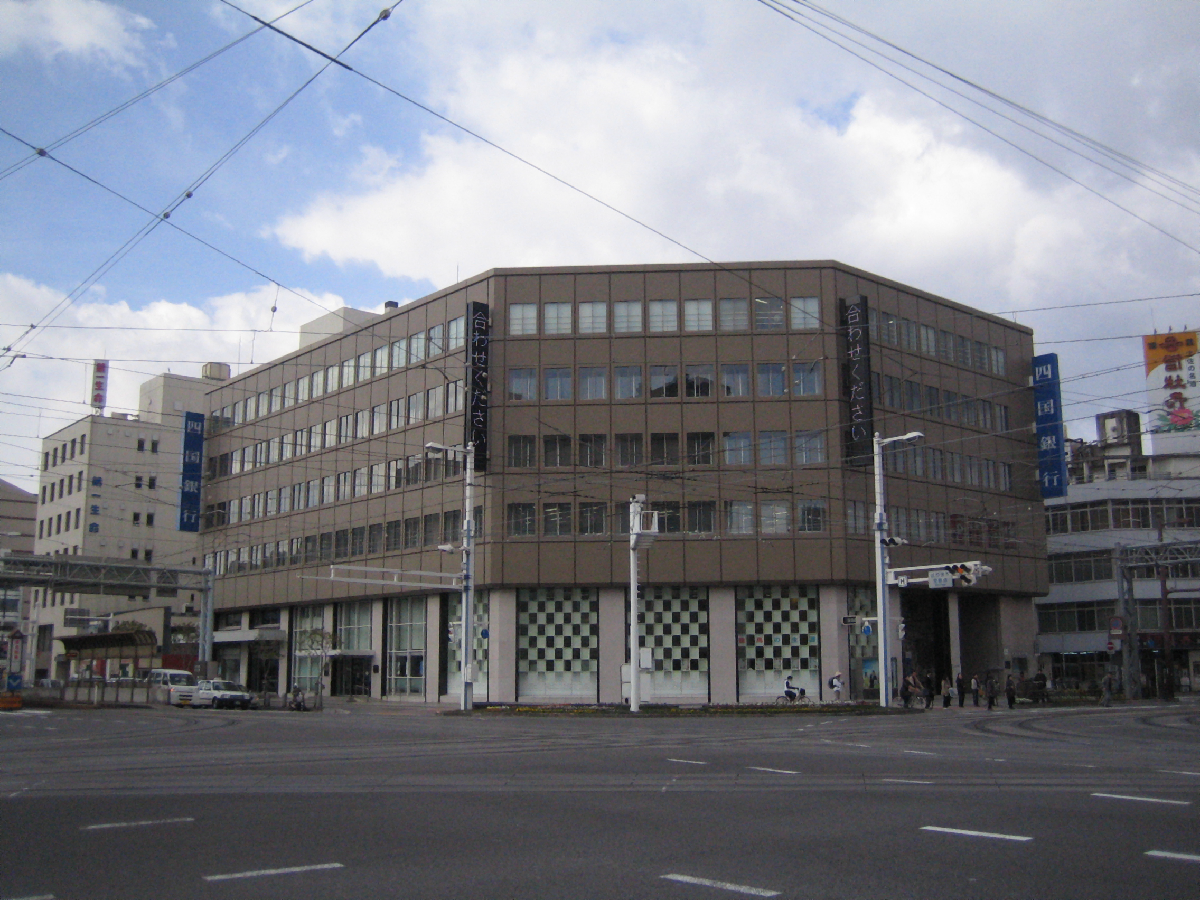
- Shikoku Bank head office building
- Type: Kabushiki gaisha public company
- Traded as: TYO: 8387
- Industry: Financial services
- Founded: October 17, 1878; 148 years ago
- Headquarters: Kōchi, Kōchi, Japan
- Area served: Kōchi Prefecture
- Products: Banking services
- Number of employees: 1,222 (2023)
- Website: www.shikokubank.co.jp

The Shikoku Bank is a Japanese regional bank founded on October 17, 1878, and headquartered in Kōchi, Japan. Its services include banking services such as deposits, loans, foreign exchange, insurance, mutual funds real estate maintenance, computer-related business, industrial, venture capital economic and financial research studies. As of March 31, 2010, the company had seven subsidiaries and one associated company.

== Seppuku pledge ==
In November 2024, screenshots of the bank's pledge on its website went viral. According to the bank's website, 23 employees, including President Miura, have signed a blood-stamped document vowing to commit seppuku if they are found guilty of engaging in financial irregularities, embezzlement or other fraudulent activities.

The pledge reads, "Anyone employed by this bank who has stolen money or caused others to steal from the bank will pay for it with his or her property and then commit suicide". The pledge was a custom from their predecessor bank, 37th National, since 1878.
