= Tokyo Star Bank =

Japanese regional bank

The Tokyo Star Bank, Limited
- Type: Public KK
- Industry: Financial services
- Founded: 2001
- Headquarters: Tokyo, Japan
- Key people: Seiji Satou, President & CEO
- Number of employees: 1,703 (March, 2017)
- Subsidiaries: TSB Capital Co.
- Website: www.tokyostarbank.co.jp/profile/en/

The Tokyo Star Bank, Ltd. (株式会社東京スター銀行, Kabushiki-gaisha Tokyo Star Ginkō) is a Japanese regional bank established on June 11, 2001 out of the reorganization of then bankrupt Tokyo Sowa Bank (founded in 1949 as Tokyo Shokusan Mujin - Mutual Loan Company) by Lone Star Funds. In 2014, the bank was purchased by Taiwan's CTBC Financial Holding, marking the first time a foreign lender had taken complete ownership of a Japanese bank.

== Products ==
=== Star One ===
This is a multipurpose deposit account for personal customers. Only a cash card is issued, unlike other more traditional banks which continue to utilize savings passbooks. In place of the passbook, the bank sends transaction reports monthly by post, as well as providing online banking services. Customers can take advantage of an ordinary savings account, fixed term deposit, and foreign currency deposits.

One of the biggest merits of this product is that customers may make unlimited use of ATMs without incurring a surcharge. In Japan, depositors typically pay charges when using an ATM after office hours, or using other banks' ATMs. With the Star One cash card, those charges are paid back to the customer at the beginning of the following month.

=== Master debit ===
Tokyo Star Bank offers two types of card, Tokyo Star Credit and Tokyo Star Debit. Tokyo Star Credit is a typical credit card, but Tokyo Star Debit is a "Master Debit Card". Customers can use it almost like a credit card, but the money used is immediately withdrawn from the account. Users need not worry about a credit limit, as the card can be used up to one's balance of the account (200,000 daily transaction limit).

=== Low spread currency exchange ===
Usually a Japanese bank would charge a higher spread and/or transaction fee to make a currency exchange transaction. Tokyo Star Bank offers competitive tight spreads for doing online currency exchange transaction. USD/JPY is the lowest of all, with a zero transaction cost in real time.

== History ==
- 1949 Tokyo Shokusan Mujin established. Afterwards renamed to Tokyo Kyowa Shokusan Mujin, Tokyo-metropolis Shokusan Mujin.
- 1951 Converted to Mutual Bank and renamed to Tokyo Sogo Bank.
- 1969 Shouichi Osada became president.
- 1975 Osada becomes chairman.
- 1989 Converted to normal Bank and renamed to Tokyo Sowa Bank (member of the Second Associations of Regional Banks).
- 1992 (collapse of bubble economy) operation begins to decline
- 1999 Filed bankruptcy and Osada was arrested next year.
- 2001 Lone Star Funds acquired this bank and renamed Tokyo Star Bank.
- 2002 Todd Budge becomes member of the board, and implemented various innovations
- 2003 Budge becomes President and CEO (First foreign President of Japanese Bank)
- 2004 Started expanding self brand ATM across the whole country, with Fujitsu.
- 2004 Started Master Debit Card.
- 2005 Listed on the first section of the Tokyo Stock Exchange (Code 8384).
- 2006 Started zero-bank ATM.
- 2014 Purchased by CTBC Financial Holding (based in Taiwan)
