= Okinawa Development Finance Corporation =

- Native name: 沖縄振興開発金融公庫
- Company type: State owned
- Founded: 15 May 1972; 54 years ago
- Headquarters: Tokyo, Japan
- Area served: Okinawa
- Number of employees: 211 (2015)
- Website: Homepage

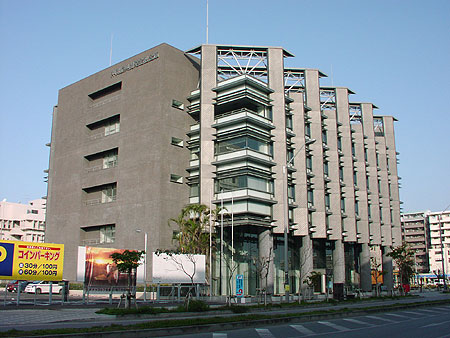
Okinawa Development Finance Corporation of head office

Okinawa Development Finance Corporation (ODFC), Okinawa Shinkō Kaihatsu Kin'yū Kōko (沖縄振興開発金融公庫), is a Policy-based financial services institution. ODFC's headquarters are located in Tokyo, Japan.

== Overview ==
The ODFC's key role is to promote the development of industries in Okinawa. This is through the provision of long-term loans and other financial facilities to small and medium-sized entrepreneurs in the island that are in the agriculture, housing, forestry, fishery and medical industries. The ODFC will also finance citizens who have met difficulties obtaining funding from private financial institutions. Through such financial assistance, the ODFC aims to vitalize the local economy of Okinawa and aid in the development of the local society.

== History ==
The Okinawa Development Finance Corporation was established on 15 May 1972 with the passing of the Okinawa Development Finance Corporation Law. This law was established along with Okinawa's return to Japan from American military occupation in order to carry out a unified and comprehensive policy-oriented financing in Okinawa. The ODFC's objective was also to fill the socio-economic gaps that existed between Okinawa and mainland Japan.

The Law led to the consolidation of the following special public corporations into the then newly formed ODFC:

- Masses Finance Corporation (大衆金融公庫) – Founded in 1964 by the Ryukyu government to finance livelihood funds that target residents
- Ryukyu Development Finance Corporation (琉球開発金融公社) – Founded in 1959 by the United States Civil Administration of the Ryukyu Islands to provide long term capital funds in Okinawa.
- Various Ryukyu government special development accounts including:
  - Industrial development funds flexibility special account
  - Agriculture, Forestry and Fisheries funds flexibility special account
  - Housing construction funds flexibility special account
  - Carrier construction funds flexibility special account

As of March 2015, the ODFC has lent out ¥946.3 billion and ¥4.2 billion in loans and investments respectively, 211 employees and 6 Offices.

== Jurisdiction ==
ODFC is subject to the supervision of the Prime Minister and the Minister of Finance under the law.

== Governance ==
The Okinawa Development Finance Corporation is governed by six person board of directors. The board consists of chairman, a vice chairman, three directors and an auditor. The chairman and auditor are appointed by the prime minister and minister of finance while the vice chairman and directors are appointed by the chairman but approved by the ministers.

== See also ==
- List of banks in Japan
- Bank of Japan
- Development Bank of Japan
- Japan Finance Corporation
