= Saitama Bank =

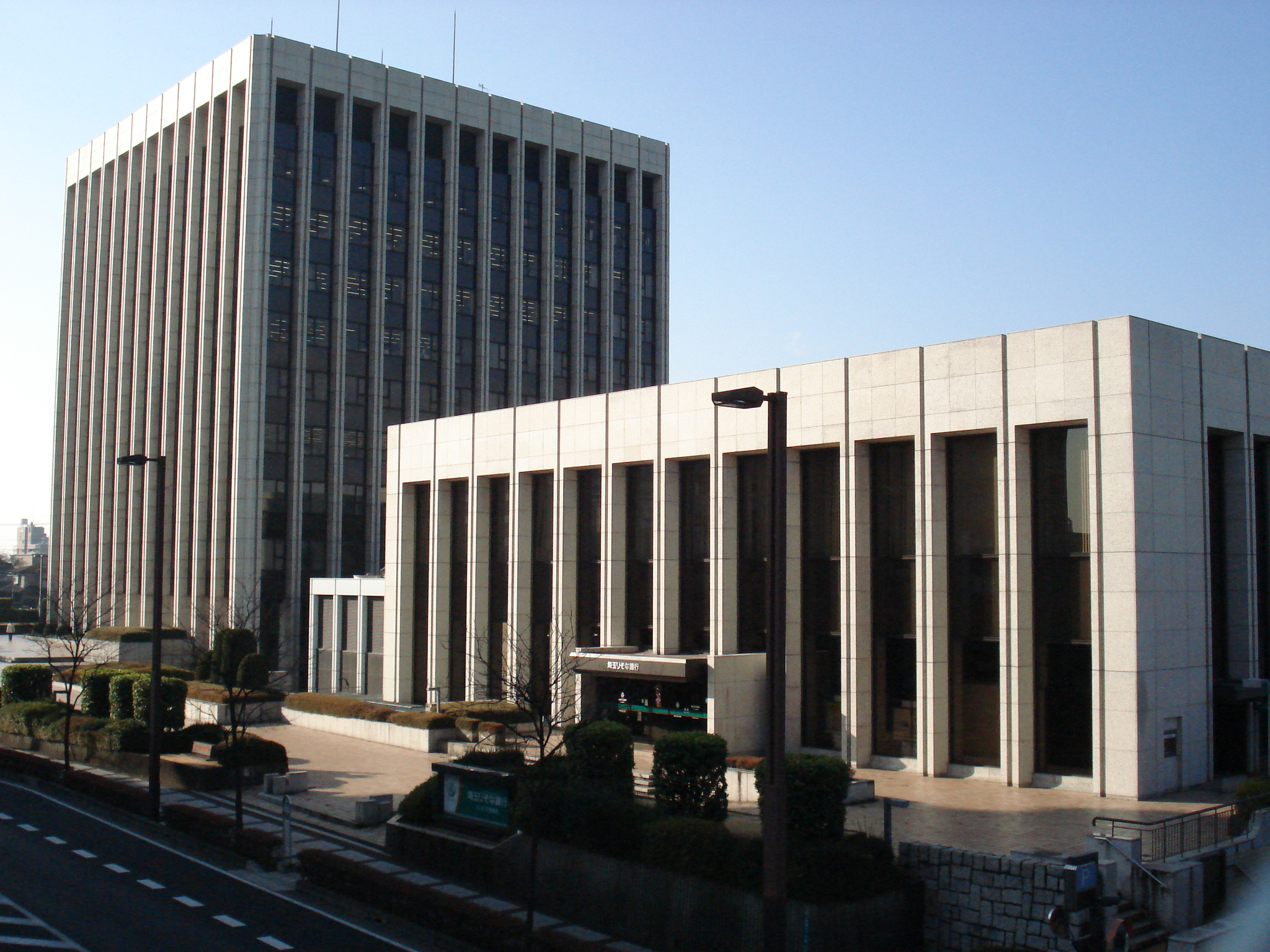
Saitama Bank

Saitama Bank (埼玉銀行, Saitama ginkō) is a Japanese regional bank founded in Saitama Prefecture in 1943. After a series of bank mergers and corporate restructuring, the Saitama Resona Bank (埼玉りそな銀行, Saitama risona ginkō) emerged as the leading bank in Saitama Prefecture.

== History ==
The head office of Saitama Bank was located in Urawa, Saitama, with more than 170 branches in Japan. Overseas branches included Singapore, London, New York, Hong Kong and Brussels.

In 1990, the bank's financial instability was revealed. Its directors were alleged to have mismanaged corporate assets and breached fiduciary duties by purchasing a large block of stock in a Japanese manufacturing company at what were grossly inflated prices.

In 1991, Kyowa Bank and Saitama Bank merged to form one of the world's largest banks with deposits totaling about $177 billion. This was construed as triggering reorganization of Japan's banking industry. In 1992, the combined banks were renamed Asahi Bank; and this bank merged with Daiwa Bank in 2002.

In 2002, corporate restructuring established Resona Holdings and the Saitama Resona Bank.

== See also ==
- List of banks in Japan
- Dai-Ichi Kangyo Bank
- Kiyoshi IzawaGM,CBD
