= Shizuoka Bank =

Japanese regional bank

The Shizuoka Bank Ltd. 株式会社静岡銀行

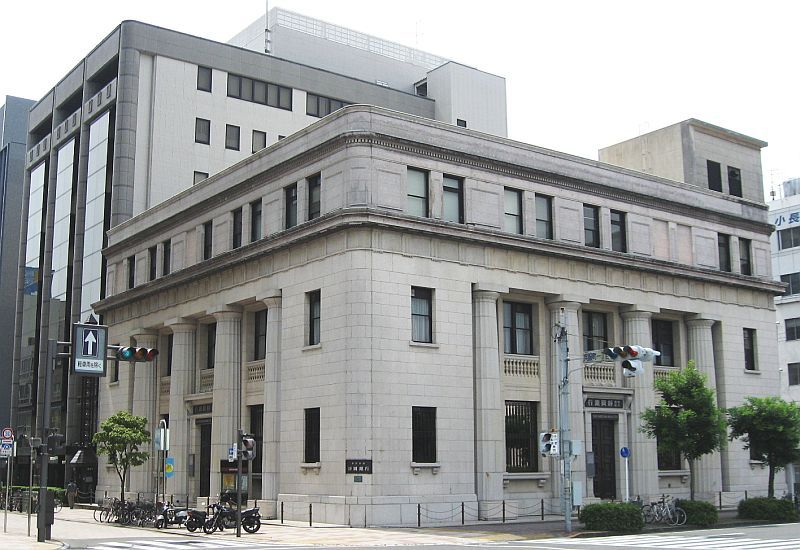
- Bank of Shizuoka head office, built in 1931, is a Japanese Important Cultural Property
- Romanized name: Kabushiki Gaisha Shizuoka Ginkō
- Company type: Public (K.K)
- Traded as: TYO: 8355
- ISIN: JP3351200005
- Industry: Finance
- Founded: March 1, 1943
- Headquarters: Gofuku-chō 1-10, Aoi-ku, Shizuoka, Shizuoka, Japan
- Number of locations: 205
- Key people: Katsunori Nakanishi (President)
- Products: Banking
- Revenue: 222,592,000,000 yen (2021)
- Operating income: 62,024,000,000 yen (2021)
- Net income: 43,722,000,000 yen (2021)
- Total assets: 14,076,128,000 yen (2021)
- Number of employees: 4,211
- Website: shizuokabank.co.jp (en)

The Shizuoka Bank Ltd. (株式会社静岡銀行, Kabushiki Gaisha Shizuoka Ginkō) is a Japanese regional bank headquartered in Shizuoka, Shizuoka Prefecture. One of the largest regional banks in Japan, it has over 190 domestic branches, primarily concentrated in the Tokai region between Tokyo and Osaka and overseas offices in Los Angeles, New York, Brussels, Hong Kong, Shanghai, and Singapore.

== History ==
The Shizuoka Bank was established on March 1, 1943, with the merger of the Shizuoka Sanjyu-go Ginkō (静岡35銀行) and the Enshu Ginkō (遠州銀行). It has been listed on the Tokyo Stock Exchange since October 1961. The Shizuoka Bank maintains strong ties to the Mitsubishi UFJ Financial Group through joint venture subsidiaries for credit cards and stock brokerage. Its New York branch was located in the New York World Trade Center at the time of the September 11, 2001, attacks, but none of its employees were killed.

In 2002, Shizuoka Bank was praised by rating agency Fitch, which noted its "overall performance and strength indicators are superior to any of the major Japanese banks."

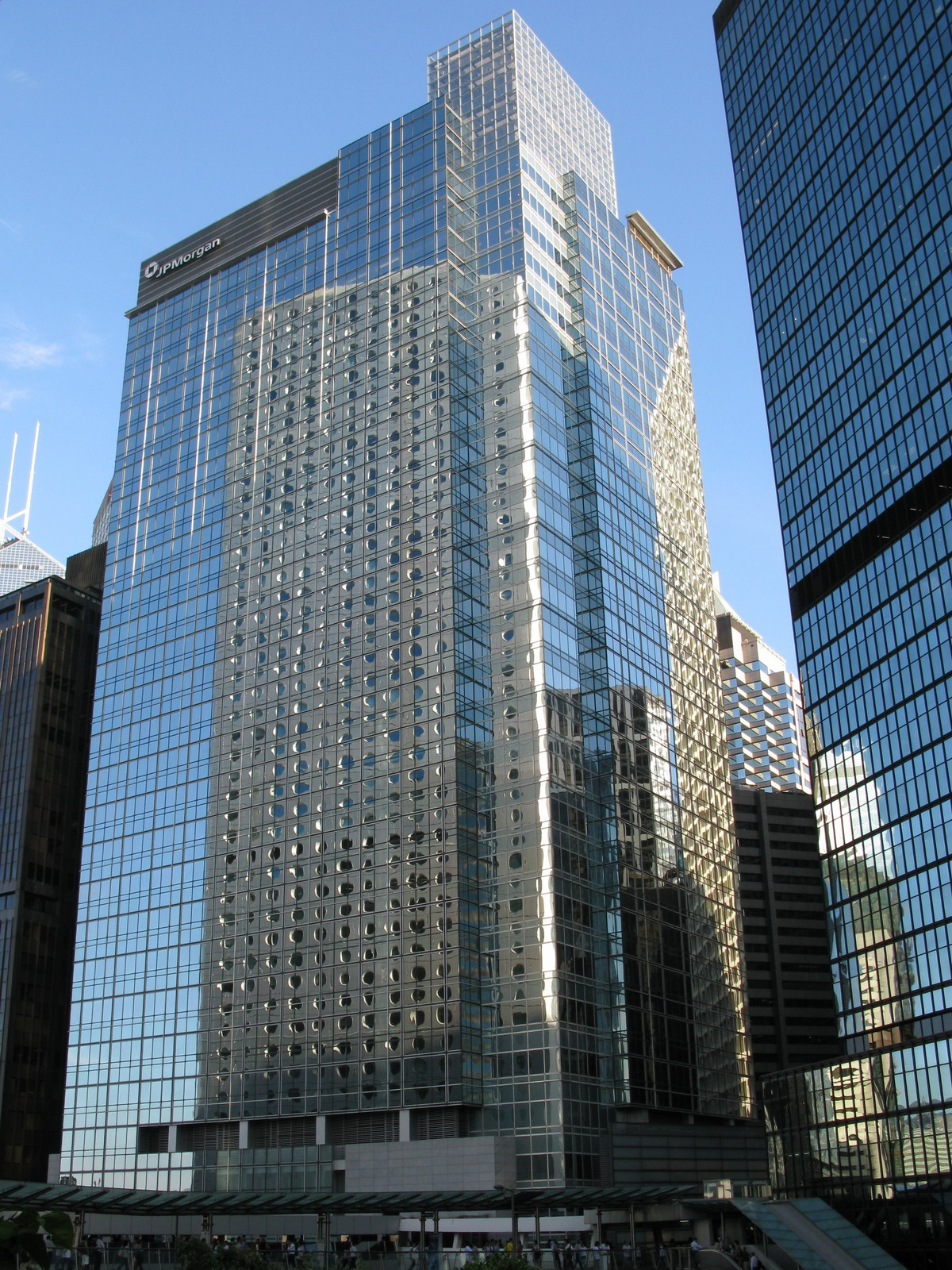
10/F, Chater House in Hong Kong
