= Bank of Kyoto =

Bank of Kyoto, Ltd.

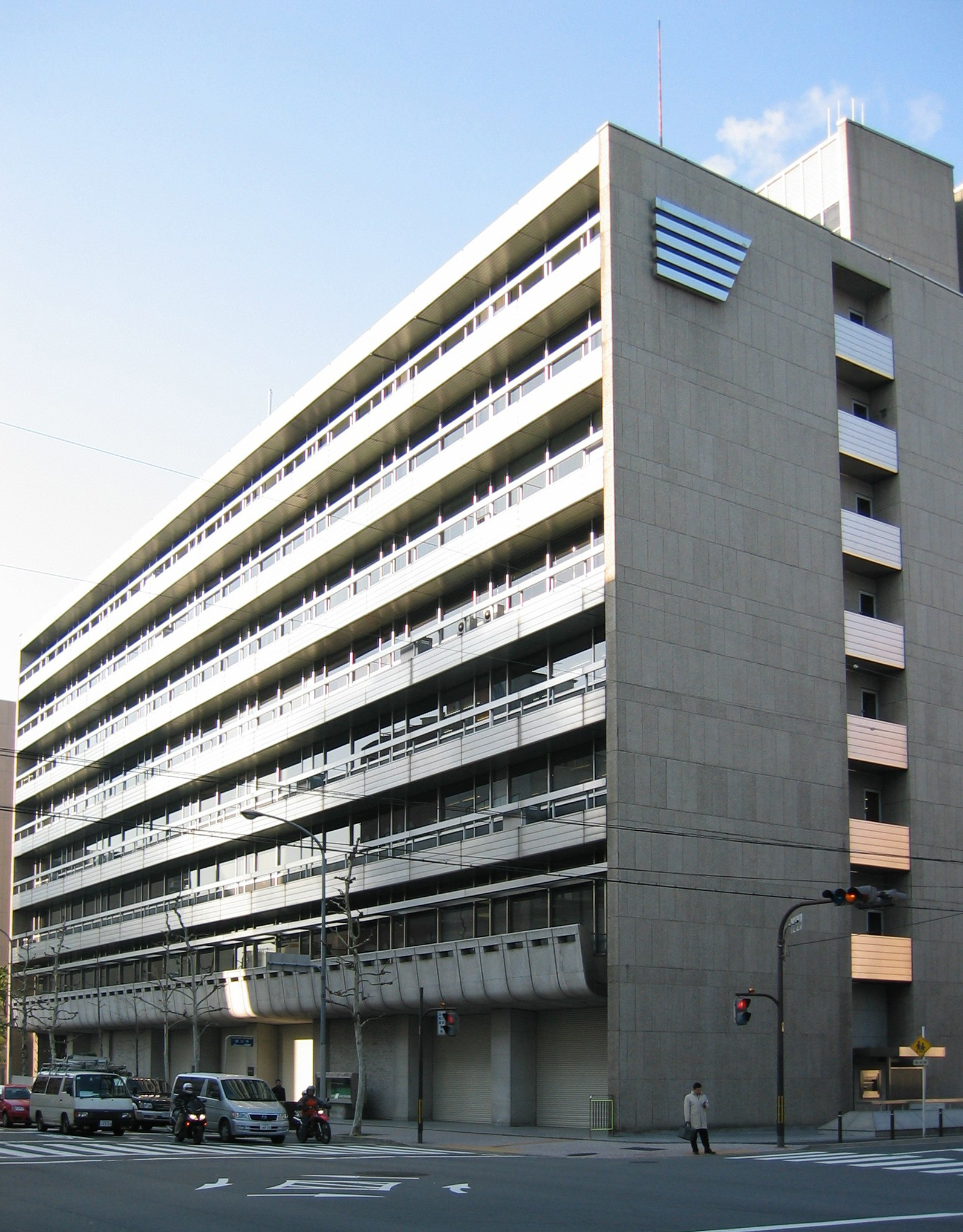
- Headquarters
- Native name: 株式会社京都銀行
- Romanized name: Kabushiki gaisha Kyōto Ginkō
- Company type: Public KK
- Traded as: TYO: 8369; TOPIX 500 Component
- Industry: Banking, Financial services
- Predecessor: Tanwa Ginko
- Founded: October 1, 1941; 84 years ago in Fukuchiyama, Kyoto
- Headquarters: Shimogyo-ku, Kyoto, Japan
- Number of locations: 172 (2017)
- Area served: Kansai region
- Key people: Nobuhiro Doi (President)
- Revenue: US$984 million (2016)
- Operating income: US$247 million (2016)
- Net income: US$165 million (2016)
- Total assets: US$79.3 billion (2017)
- Total equity: US$6.83 billion (2017)
- Number of employees: 3,428 (2017)
- Subsidiaries: Kyogin Securities Co., Ltd.; Kyogin Lease & Capital Co., Ltd.
- Capital ratio: 12.5% (2017)
- Rating: S&P: Acir

The Bank of Kyoto, Ltd. (株式会社京都銀行, Kabushiki gaisha Kyōto Ginkō) is a Japanese regional bank based in Kyoto. The bank operates mainly in the Kansai region with more than 165 branches in Kyoto, Osaka, Shiga, Nara, Hyōgo, Aichi and Tokyo Prefectures.

The bank offers several banking services such as deposits, loans, commodity trading, securities investment, domestic and foreign exchange services. Other business operations include the operation and leasing of real estate, commercial support services, manpower dispatching, credit guarantee services, credit card services, economic survey and consulting services. Founded on 1 October 1941, it now has 3,428 employees.

The bank is listed in the Tokyo Stock Exchange and has a market capitalization of 430 billion Japanese Yen (US$3.82 billion) as of 5 December 2017.
