= Akita Bank =

Japanese regional bank

The Akita Bank, Ltd.

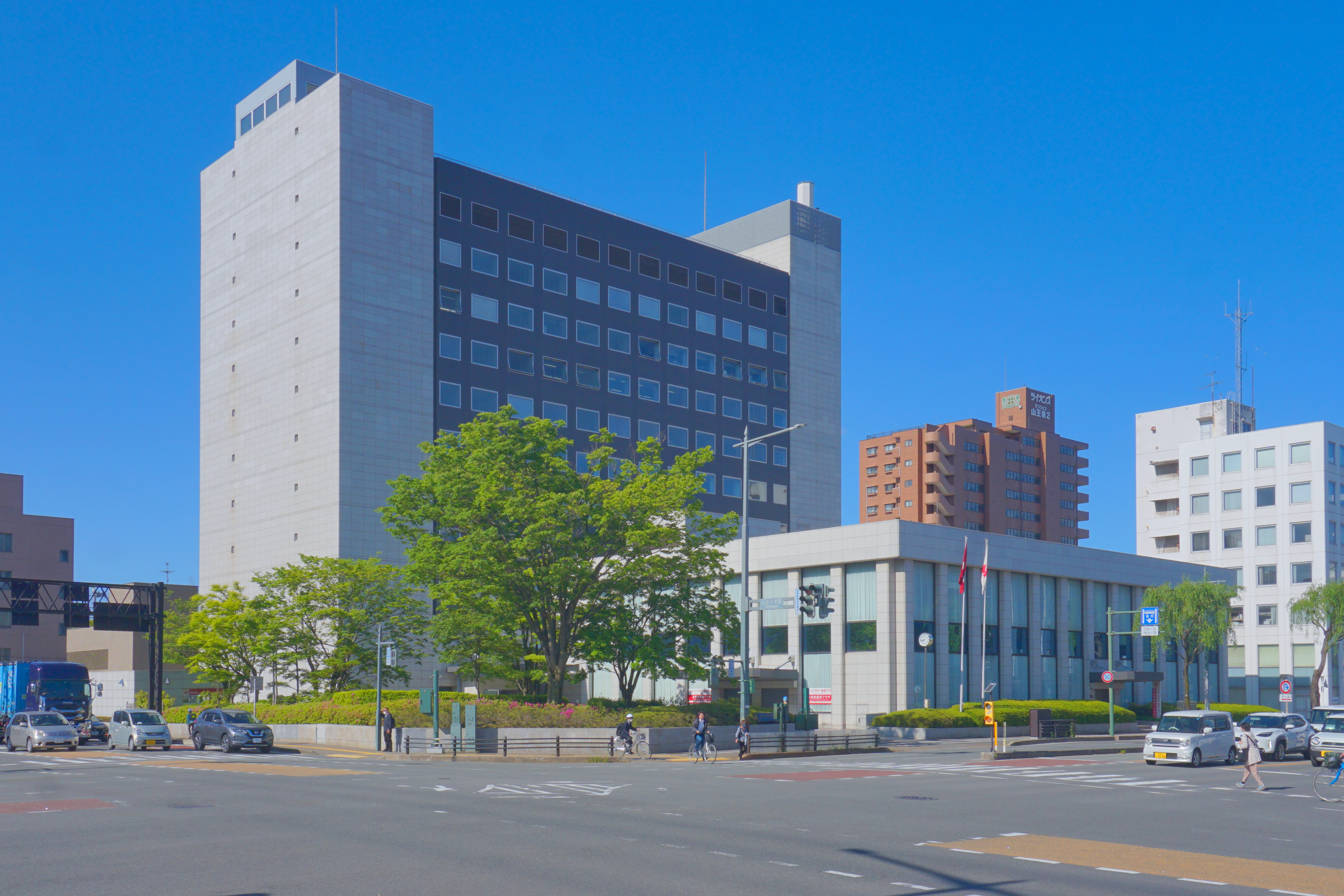
- Native name: 株式会社秋田銀行
- Romanized name: Kabushiki-gaisha Akita Ginkō
- Type: Public KK
- Traded as: TYO: 8343
- Industry: Banking financial services
- Predecessor: The 48th Bank (January 20, 1879)
- Founded: Akita, Japan
- Headquarters: Akita, Japan (October 20, 1941)
- Number of locations: 98
- Area served: Tōhoku region, Japan
- Key people: Takao Minatoya (President)
- Products: Retail Banking; Payday advance Mortgages; Consumer Finance; Investment Banking
- Net income: 3.758 billion yen
- Total assets: 2,602.8 billion yen
- Number of employees: 1,481
- Website: akita-bank.co.jp

The Akita Bank, Ltd. (株式会社秋田銀行, Kabushiki-gaisha Akita Ginkō) (TYO: 8343) is a Japanese regional bank headquartered in the city of Akita, Akita Prefecture. Although the bank’s core business comes from Akita prefecture, various branches are situated outside of the area. These include Koriyama, Sapporo, Morioka, Sendai, and Tokyo. The bank was noted for its initial reluctance to establish a wide ATM network, finally implementing one in January 2003.

== Profile ==
Total Assets: Approximately ¥2.6 trillion
SWIFT Code: AKITJPJT
Employees: 1,554
Branches: 98 (83 Within Akita Prefecture)
President: Takao Minatoya
Member: Regional Banks Association of Japan

== History ==
The forerunner of the Aomori Bank was The 48th National Bank (第四十八国立銀行, Dai-Yonjūhachi Kokuritsu Ginkō), established January 20, 1879. The bank was privatized in January, 1889, becoming The 48th Bank (第四十八銀行, Dai-Yonjūhachi Ginkō). The former Akita branch of the First National Bank was dissolved in May 1896, becoming the Akita Bank. In March 1897, the Yuzawa Bank (湯沢銀行, Yuzawa Ginkō) was founded. These three banks merged on October 20, 1941, to form the present Akita Bank. The bank was listed on the second section of the Tokyo Stock Exchange from April 1973, and of the first section of the Tokyo Stock Exchange from April 1974. While the former mascot for the bank had been Woody Woodpecker (along with Winnie Woodpecker), the current mascot is Astro Boy.

== See also ==
- List of banks
- List of banks in Japan
