= Kanto Tsukuba Bank =

The Kanto Tsukuba Bank, Ltd. 株式会社関東つくば銀行
- Company type: Public KK
- Industry: Banking
- Predecessor: Shimotsuma Mujin Kaisha
- Founded: 1927
- Headquarters: Tsuchiura City, Japan
- Number of locations: 85 branches
- Area served: Ibaraki Prefecture
- Key people: Takashi Kusama (President)
- AUM: 1.22 trillion yen (USD 9.4 billion) (2005)
- Number of employees: 1,072 (2005)

The Kanto Tsukuba Bank, Ltd. (株式会社関東つくば銀行) is a Japanese regional bank that is headquartered in Tsuchiura City, Ibaraki Prefecture. This bank was formed in 2003 as the result of a merger between the Kanto Bank and the Tsukuba Bank.

While the bank has a majority of its branches in Ibaraki Prefecture, it operates several branches outside the prefecture, notable in Tokyo, Chiba, Tochigi, and Saitama Prefectures. The bank is known in its shortened form as the "Kan Gin." Its largest stakeholder is the Master Trust Bank of Japan, with over 6% of its shares.

== History ==
The Kanto Tsukuba Bank can trace its roots to the establishment of the Shimotsuma Mutual Aid Credit Company (Shimotsuma Mujin Kaisha) in 1927, which would later become the Tsukuba Bank. The Kanto Bank was established in Tsuchiura City in 1952. These two banks merged in 2003, forming the current bank.

In November 2004, the Kanto Tsukuba Bank and the Ibaraki Bank announced plans for a merger, to take place in 2006, that would have created the Hitachino Bank. The bank was scheduled to begin operations in July 2006, but disagreements between the two banks resulted in the deal being dropped. The new bank was expected to have total assets of around two trillion yen, making it the dominant regional bank in the prefecture.
