= Shinkin Central Bank =

- Central bank of: Japan
- Headquarters: Shinkin Central Bank, 1-3-7, YaesuCHUO-KU 103-0028, Tokyo, Japan
- Established: 1950
- Ownership: Government of Japan
- Governor: Hiroyuki Shibata (as of June 9 2022 - )
- Currency: Japanese yen JPY (ISO 4217)
- Reserves: 175.20 billion USD

== Activities ==
Shinkin Central Bank is a central bank for shinkin banks nationwide in Japan. Shinkin banks operate as a cooperative financial institution. The Shinkin Central Bank has developed businesses that support the shinkin banking industry. The Bank's roles are enhancement of the credit standing, efficient use of shikin bank's surplus funds, and settlement of domestic exchange transaction.
