= Bank of Yokohama =

Japanese bank

The Bank of Yokohama, Ltd.

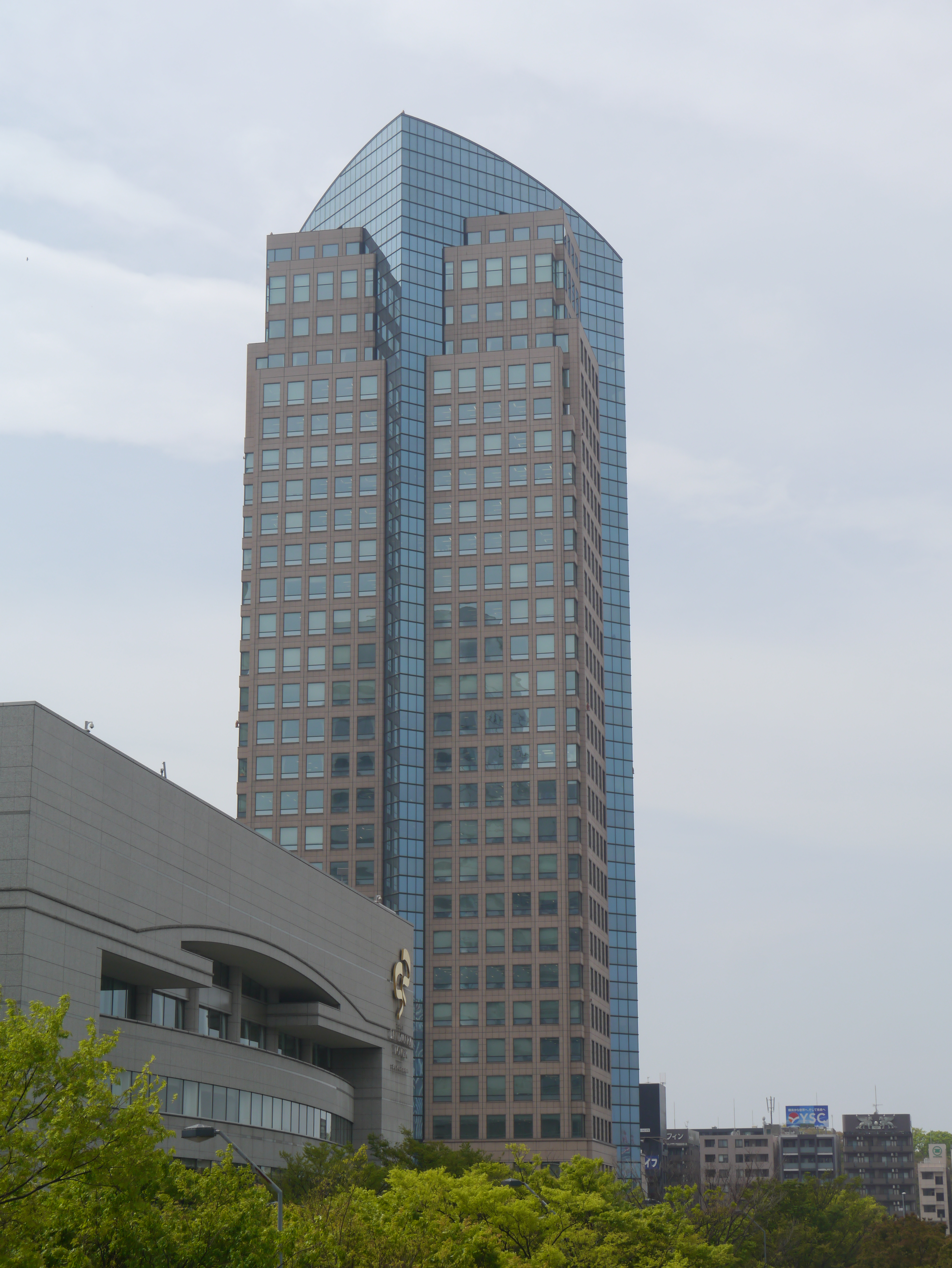
- Bank of Yokohama Headquarters
- Native name: 株式会社横浜銀行
- Romanized name: Kabushiki Gaisha Yokohama Ginkō
- Type: Public (Kabushiki gaisha)
- Traded as: TYO: 8332
- Industry: Financial services
- Predecessor: Dai-Ni Bank; Shichijushi Bank; Yokohama Savings Bank; Kamakura Bank, etc.
- Founded: December 16, 1920; 105 years ago
- Headquarters: Yokohama, Kanagawa, Japan
- Number of locations: 619 (December 2023)
- Area served: Japan; China and Southeast Asia; North America
- Key people: Tatsuya Kataoka (President)
- Services: Retail banking; Commercial banking; Investment banking
- Revenue: ▲JP¥277.959 billion (March 2024)
- Operating income: ▼JP¥61.359 billion (March 2024)
- Net income: ▼JP¥42.219 billion (March 2024)
- AUM: ▲JP¥17.2602 trillion (March 2024)
- Total assets: ▼JP¥21.8051 trillion (March 2024)
- Total equity: ▲JP¥1.0509 trillion (March 2024)
- Number of employees: 4067 (September 2023)
- Parent: Yokohama Financial Group
- Subsidiaries: Subsidiaries of Bank of Yokohama
- Website: www.boy.co.jp (en)

The Bank of Yokohama, Ltd. (株式会社横浜銀行, Kabushiki gaisha Yokohama Ginkō; BOY) is the largest regional bank in Japan. It is based and headquartered in Yokohama, and operates its businesses mainly in Kanagawa Prefecture and southwestern Tokyo. The bank is often called Hamagin (浜銀) for short by the locals. It has 632 domestic offices and five overseas offices (Shanghai, Singapore, Hong Kong, Bangkok and New York). It is a wholly owned subsidiary and the core arm of Yokohama Financial Group, a Japanese bank holding company since 2016.

== History ==
The bank was founded in 1920 as a regional bank to serve customers in Kanagawa Prefecture and southwestern Tokyo. It was formed in the wake of the collapse of several existing banks in the region, one of which (Dai-Ni Bank) began operations in 1869 as Yokohama Bank (横浜為替会社), the first modern financial institution in Japan; consequentially, Bank of Yokohama claims to have the longest history of any Japanese bank.

In 2015, Bank of Yokohama announced a merger with the smaller Higashi-Nippon Bank to create Concordia Financial Group, the largest regional bank holding company in Japan. Upon completion of this transaction in March 2016, Bank of Yokohama was de-listed, and Concordia took its place as a constituent of the Nikkei 225 stock market index.

== Subsidiaries and affiliates ==
- Kanagawa Bank
- Hamagin Tokai Tokyo Securities
- Hamagin Finance
- Hamagin Research Institute
- Sky Ocean Asset Management
- Yokohama Capital
- Yokohama Guarantee
- Hamagin Business Challenged
- Bankcard Service Japan
- Bank Resona Perdania

== See also ==
- Loans in Japan
