= Shinkin bank =

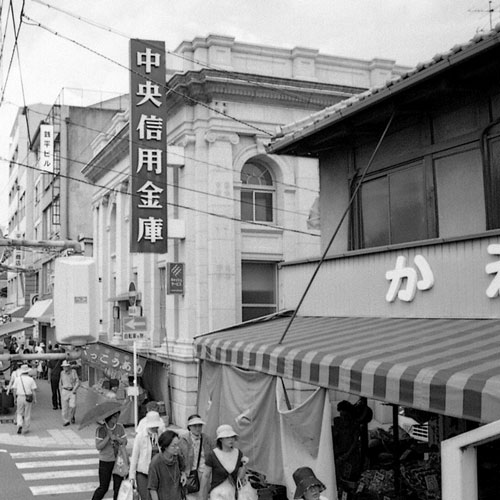
The building of Kyoto Chuo Shinkin Bank.

A Shinkin bank (信用金庫, Shin-yō kinko, literally "credit treasury") is a type of Japanese deposit institution.

They are cooperative regional financial institutions serving small and medium enterprises and local residents. Anyone who lives, works, or has an office in the region served by the bank can become a member. However, companies with over 300 employees are prohibited from membership.

The Shinkin Central Bank serves as the central bank for the Shinkin banks. In this role it makes loans to and accepts deposits from Shinkin banks. The supervising authority is the Financial Services Agency.

Shinkin banks were founded in 1951. They were created to serve some of the same functions as credit unions, but can accept deposit from non-members (inside and outside their area) without limitation and make loans to the "graduated" (outgrew the membership qualifications) members.

As of March 2017, there were 264 Shinkin banks with $1,229 billion in deposits.
