= Senshu Ikeda Bank =

Senshu Ikeda Bank, Ltd. (Senshu Ikeda Ginkō; 池田泉州銀行) is a Japanese regional bank. Headquartered in Kishiwada, Osaka, it has 139 branches. On May 1, 2010, Senshu Bank merged with the Ikeda Bank to become the Senshu Ikeda Bank.

== History ==
Senshu Bank was founded in January 1951 and was involved in loaning, credit cards, leasing, and the development and sale of computer software. It was traded on the Osaka Securities Exchange under symbol 8372. Its primary shareholders were Mitsubishi UFJ Financial Group and The Bank of Tokyo-Mitsubishi UFJ.

Ikeda Bank was established in September 1951, with its headquarters in Ikeda. It was the "surviving" institution in the merger.
