= Joyo Bank =

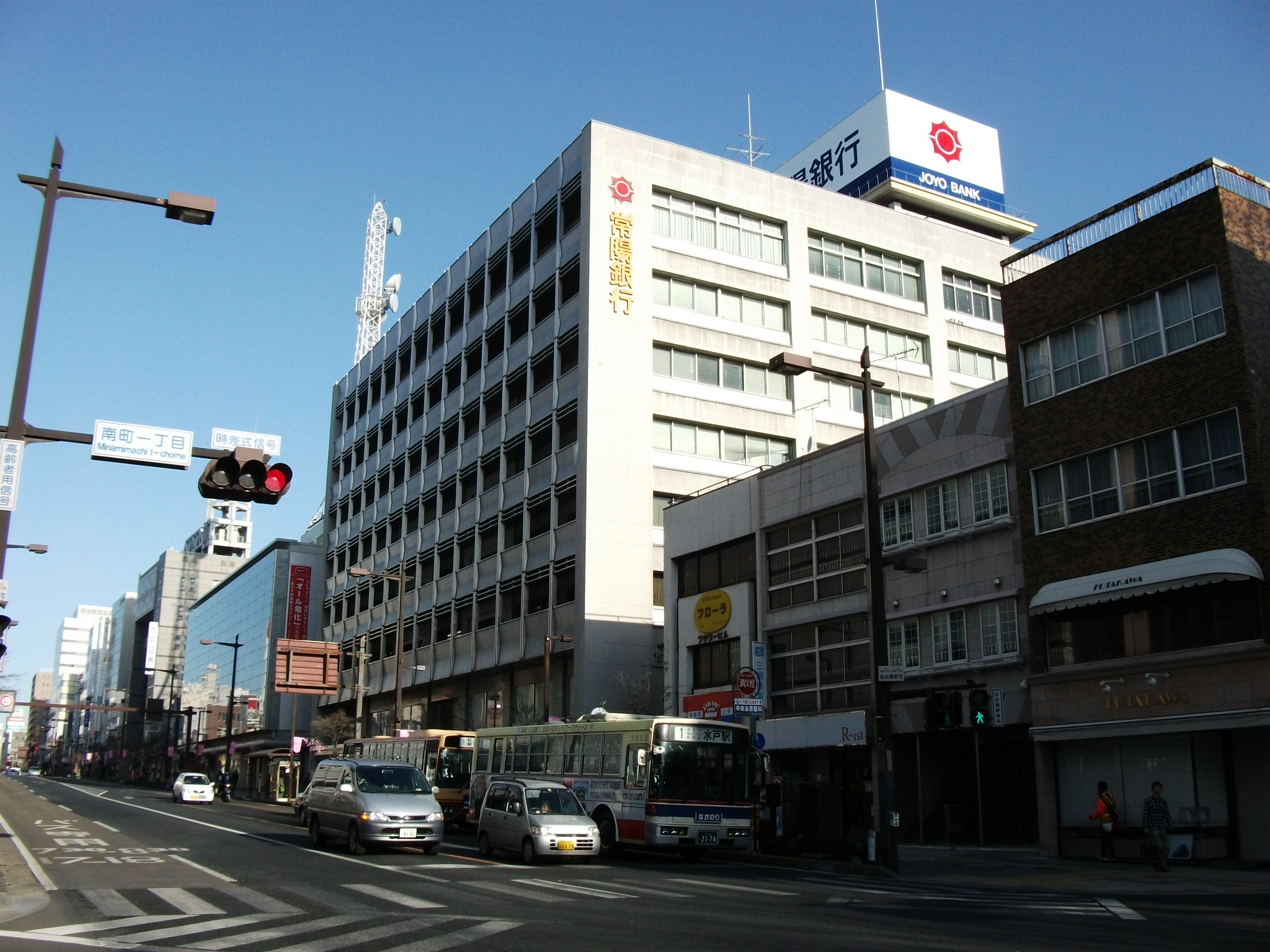
- Joyo Bank head office
- Founded: July 30, 1935
- Headquarters: Ibaraki Prefecture, Japan
- Website: https://www.joyobank.co.jp/

The Joyo Bank, Ltd. (株式会社常陽銀行, Jōyō Ginkō Kabushiki Kaisha) is a Japanese regional bank that is headquartered in Mito city, Ibaraki Prefecture. The bank is relatively large among Japanese regional lenders, and operates branches throughout the Kantō region. In addition to branches in Miyagi, Fukushima, Chiba, Saitama, Tokyo, and Osaka prefectures, the bank also operates a representative office in Shanghai. While the bank has many stakeholders, prominent shareholders include the Bank of Tokyo-Mitsubishi, along with several major Japanese insurance companies

Although Ibaraki Prefecture ranks only 24th in size among Japan's 47 prefectures, it ranks 4th in terms of usable area. It is therefore one of the leading producers of agricultural products and has a largely rural population. As a consequence of this, Joyo Bank has had to maintain a large but inefficient branch network. This feature has helped the bank by limiting competition from other banks, with the result that Joyo Bank has been able to command a 38% market share of deposits and 42% share of loans in Ibaraki.

== History ==
The Joyo Bank can trace its roots back to the Meiji era in 1878 with the establishment of the Goju Bank (五十銀行, Gojū Ginkō) and the Tokiwa Bank (常磐銀行, Tokiwa Ginkō). These two institutions merged on July 30, 1935 to form the Joyo Bank.

During the 1980s and 1990s, the Joyo Bank opened up representative offices in major markets such as New York City (1987 – 2002), London (1982 – 2000), Hong Kong (1994 – 1999), and Shanghai (est. 1996). Of these, only the Shanghai office remains open.

As of March 31, 2005

Assets: Approximately 6.1 trillion yen (approximately US$56 billion)
Employees: 3,512
Branches: 145 branches, 25 sub-branches, 1 overseas representative office
President: Kunio Onizawa
Member: Regional Banks Association of Japan

Since this time, the bank has merged with several other regional banks.
