= List of banks in Japan =

This is a list of banks in Japan.

== Central Bank ==
- Bank of Japan

== Governmental institutions ==
=== National institutions ===
==== Current ====
- Development Bank of Japan (DBJ; Nihon Seisaku Tōshi Ginkō K.K. (株式会社日本政策投資銀行))
- Japan Finance Corporation (JFC; Nihon Seisaku Kin'yū Kōko K.K. (株式会社日本政策金融公庫))
  - Japan Bank for International Cooperation (JBIC; Kokusai Kyōryoku Ginkō (国際協力銀行)), the internal division of Japan Finance Corporation.
- Okinawa Development Finance Corporation (Okinawa Shinkō Kaihatsu Kin'yū Kōko (沖縄振興開発金融公庫))
- Shoko Chukin Bank (Shōkō Kumiai Chūō Kinko K.K. (株式会社商工組合中央金庫))
- Japan Housing Finance Agency (Jūtaku Kin'yū Shien Kikō (独立行政法人住宅金融支援機構))

==== Former ====
- Japan Post (Nihon Yūsei Kōsha (日本郵政公社)), restructured to Japan Post Bank in 2007.
- Agriculture Forestry and Fisheries Finance Corporation (AFC; Nōrin Gyogyō Kin'yū Kōko (農林漁業金融公庫)), merged to JFC in 2008.
- Japan Finance Corporation for Small and Medium Enterprise (JASME; Chūshō Kigyō Kin'yū Kōko (中小企業金融公庫)), merged to JFC in 2008.
- National Life Finance Corporation (NLFC; Kokumin Seikatsu Kin'yū Kōko (国民生活金融公庫)), merged to JFC in 2008.
- Japan Finance Corporation for Municipal Enterprises (Kōei Kigyō Kin'yū Kōko (公営企業金融公庫)), abolished and integrated into JFM in 2008.

=== Postal Savings Bank ===
- Japan Post BankYūcho Gin'kō K.K. (株式会社ゆうちょ銀行), former Japan Post's banking division and subsidiary of the successor Japan Post Holding.

=== Regional Municipalities', Authorities' Mutual Corporation ===
==== Current ====
- Japan Finance Organization for Municipalities (JFM; Chihō Kokyōdantai Kin'yū Kikō (地方公共団体金融機構))

==== Former ====
- Japan Finance Organization for Municipal Enterprises, established in 2008 and restructured as JFM in 2009.

== Megabanks ==
- Mitsubishi UFJ Financial Group
  - The Bank of Tokyo-Mitsubishi UFJ
  - Mitsubishi UFJ Trust and Banking Corporation
  - The Senshū Bank
  - The Master Trust Bank of Japan
- Sumitomo Mitsui Financial Group
  - Sumitomo Mitsui Banking Corporation
- Mizuho Financial Group
  - Mizuho Bank
  - Mizuho Trust & Banking Co.
  - Chiba Kōgyō Bank
  - Trust & Custody Services Bank

== Money center banks ==
- Sumitomo Mitsui Trust Holdings
  - Sumitomo Trust and Banking
  - The Chuo Mitsui Trust and Banking Co.
  - Mitsui Asset Trust and Banking Co.
- Resona Holdings
  - Resona Bank
  - Saitama Resona Bank
  - Kinki Osaka Bank
  - Resona Trust & Banking Co.
- Aozora Bank, former Nippon Credit Bank
  - Aozora Trust Bank
- SBI Shinsei Bank, former Long-Term Credit Bank of Japan
  - Shinsei Trust & Banking Co.

== Regional banks ==
As of January 2025, there are 100 regional banks (地方銀行), with their head offices usually in the capital cities of the 47 Japanese prefectures, serving mainly their local customers. Some of the larger banks had or have opened offices in nearby countries such as China, the US, or the UK., but the number of these has declined since the 1990s.

Examples of them include:

- Bank of Yokohama - the largest regional bank in Japan and the core arm of Concordia Financial Group.
- Hachijuni Nagano Bank in Nagano City.
- Bank of Kyoto in Kyoto.
- The 77 Bank in Sendai - the largest regional bank in the Tōhoku region.

== Trust banks ==
- Mitsubishi UFJ Trust and Banking Corporation (subsidiary of Mitsubishi UFJ Financial Group)
- Mizuho Trust & Banking Co. (subsidiary of Mizuho Financial Group)
- Sumitomo Mitsui Trust Holdings
  - Sumitomo Trust and Banking
  - The Chuo Mitsui Trust and Banking Co.
  - Mitsui Asset Trust and Banking Co.
- The Master Trust Bank of Japan (subsidiary of Mitsubishi UFJ Financial Group)
- The Nomura Trust & Banking Co. (subsidiary of Nomura Holdings)
- NikkoCiti Trust and Banking (joint venture of Nikko Cordial and Citigroup)
- ORIX Trust and Banking (subsidiary of Orix)
- Shinkin Trust Bank (subsidiary of Shinkin Central Bank)
- Aozora Trust Bank (subsidiary of Aozora Bank)
- Nōrinchūkin Trust and Banking (subsidiari of Norinchukin Bank)
- Shinsei Trust & Banking Co. (subsidiary of SBI Shinsei Bank)
- JSF Trust and Banking Co. (subsidiary of Japan Securities Finance Co.)
- ShinGinkō Tokyo (subsidiary of Tokyo Metropolitan Government)
- Japan Trustee Services Bank (joint venture of Resona Holdings and Sumitomo Mitsui Trust Holdings)
- Trust & Custody Services Bank (subsidiary of Mizuho Financial Group)
- Resona Trust & Banking Co. (subsidiary of Resona Holdings)

== Foreign banks ==
=== Members of the International Bankers Association in Japan ===
==== Financial Groups ====
- ANZ Bank
- Bank of New York Mellon
- Barclays
- BNP Paribas
- BofA Securities
- Citigroup
- Crédit Agricole
- Credit Suisse
- DBS Bank
- Deutsche Bank
- Goldman Sachs
- HSBC
- JPMorgan Chase
- National Australia Bank
- Royal Bank of Canada
- Société Générale
- Standard Chartered
- UBS
- Wells Fargo

==== Commercial Banks ====
- ANZ Bank
- Banco Bilbao Vizcaya Argentaria
- Banco do Brasil
- Bangkok Bank
- Bank of Communications
- Bank of India
- China Construction Bank
- Chinatrust Commercial Bank
- Commerzbank
- Commonwealth Bank
- DBS Bank
- Depfa Bank
- ING
- Itaú Unibanco
- Korea Exchange Bank
- Lloyds Bank
- Metropolitan Bank and Trust Company
- National Australia Bank
- Oversea-Chinese Banking Corporation
- Philippine National Bank
- Bank Negara Indonesia
- Rabobank
- Scotiabank
- Standard Chartered Bank
- State Bank of India
- UniCredit
- Union de Banques Arabes et Françaises
- United Overseas Bank
- Wells Fargo
- WestLB

==== Representative Offices ====
- Banco Santander
- CIC Banks
- Crédit Foncier
- Euroclear Bank
- Caixa Economica Federal

=== Other ===
- Banco Itaú
- Bank Muamalat Malaysia
- Bank of China
- Bank of Hawaii
- Bank of New Zealand
- Bank of Taiwan
- BayernLB
- Canadian Imperial Bank of Commerce
- Chang Hwa Bank
- First Commercial Bank
- Habib Metropolitan Bank
- Hana Financial Group
- Industrial and Commercial Bank of China
- Kiup Bank
- Kookmin Bank
- Korea Development Bank
- Korea Exchange Bank
- Mega International Commercial Bank
- SC First Bank
- Shinhan Bank
- Union Bank of California
- Westpac
- Woori Bank

== Community banking system ==
- Shinkin Banks
  - Shinkin Central Bank
    - Shinkin Trust Bank
- Shinkumis
- Labour Banks
- JA Banks
  - Nōrinchūkin Bank
    - Nōrinchūkin Trust and Banking

== M&A Tree ==
Japan's banking system has consolidated dramatically since the 1990s. The list below gives an account of the banking industry's composition and consolidation. These banks are usually called the "City banks" (都市銀行).

- Mizuho Financial Group (2000) / Mizuho Bank / Mizuho Corporate Bank (2002)
  - Dai-Ichi Kangyo Bank (1971)
    - Dai-Ichi Bank
    - Nippon Kangyo Bank
  - Fuji Bank
  - Industrial Bank of Japan
- Mitsubishi UFJ Financial Group (2005) / The Bank of Tokyo-Mitsubishi UFJ (2006)
  - Mitsubishi Tokyo Financial Group (2001) / The Bank of Tokyo-Mitsubishi (1996)
    - The Bank of Tokyo
    - Mitsubishi Bank
  - UFJ Holdings / UFJ Bank (2002)
    - Sanwa Bank (1933)
      - Sanjūyon Bank
      - Yamaguchi Bank
      - Kōnoike Bank
    - Tōkai Bank (1941)
      - Aichi Bank
      - Nagoya Bank
      - Itō Bank
- Sumitomo Mitsui Banking Corporation (2002)
  - The Sumitomo Bank
  - Sakura Bank (1990)
    - Mitsui Bank
    - Taiyō-Kobe Bank (1973)
      - Taiyō Bank
      - Bank of Kobe
- Resona Holdings / Resona Bank / Saitama Resona Bank (2002)
  - Asahi Bank (1991)
    - Kyōwa Bank
    - Saitama Bank
  - Daiwa Bank
- Mitsui Trust Holdings (2002) / The Chūō Mitsui Trust and Banking Co. (2000)
  - The Chūō Trust and Banking Co.
  - Mitsui Trust and Banking Co.

=== Bankruptcy ===
- Hokkaidō Takushoku Bank, absorbed into North Pacific Bank and The Chūō Mitsui Trust and Banking Co. (1998)

== See also ==
- Lists of banks
