= 2024 Northern Pride RLFC season =

Coordinates: 16°55′49″S 145°46′2″E

Northern Pride
Club information
- Full name: Northern Pride Rugby League Football Club
- Nickname: The Pride
- Colours: Black, teal and gold
- Founded: 2007; 19 years ago
- Website: northernpride.com.au

Current details
- Ground: Barlow Park, Cairns (seating 1,700, standing 15,000)
- CEO: Garreth Smith (2022–)
- Chairman: Terry Medhurst (2024–)
- Coach: Eric Smith (2024)
- Manager: Sam Harreman
- Captain: Kyle Schneider (2024–)
- Competition: Hostplus Cup Mal Meninga Cup Cyril Connell Cup Harvey Norman U19 Harvey Norman U17 BMD Premiership (from 2025)
- 2024: 1
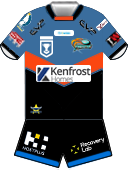
Home colours

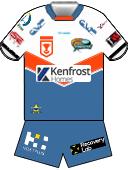
Away colours
- Current season

Records
- Premierships: 2 (2010, 2014)
- Runners-up: 1 (2009)
- Minor premierships: 3 (2013, 2014, 2024)

Queensland Cup
- Sport: Rugby league
- Inaugural season: 2008
- Number of teams: 15
- Country: Australia
- Most titles: Redcliffe Dolphins (6 titles)
- Website: Queensland Cup
- Broadcast partner: Nine Network

2024 was the seventeenth competitive season for the Cairns-based Kenfrost Homes Northern Pride Rugby League Football Club. They were one of 15 clubs that compete in Queensland's top rugby league competition, QRL's Hostplus Cup. The Northern Pride played 20 home-and-away matches over 23 rounds between March and August, finishing as minor premiers with 17 wins and 3 losses, scoring 660 points and conceding 308 for a points differential of +352.

Eric Smith was appointed as head coach on a two-year contract, replacing Ty Williams, who had coached the Pride for seven seasons. Smith previously coached the Sunshine Coast Falcons to a minor premiership in 2019 and was development coach at the Newcastle Knights from 2020–2022. Kyle Schneider was appointed captain for 2024, with Ewan Moore and Evan Child as vice-captains.

The Pride are a feeder club to the North Queensland Toyota Cowboys. The Cowboys split their squad of first grade and development players between their QCup feeder clubs, and players not required for that weekend's NRL fixture play for their feeder team. The Pride and Cutters have been Cowboys feeder clubs since entering the competition in 2008, and the Blackhawks became the third feeder club when they joined in 2015. After the Blackhawks terminated their arrangement with the Cowboys and signed a two-year affiliation (2024–2025) with the South Sydney Rabbitohs in October 2023, the Cowboys' allocation was divided between just two teams (the Pride and Cutters) for the first time in ten years.

The Pride finished the regular season undefeated at home with 10 wins from 10 matches at Barlow Park, and went undefeated from Round 9 onwards. In the finals series, the Pride defeated the Sunshine Coast Falcons 38–0 in the qualifying final at Barlow Park on 31 August, but were eliminated in the preliminary final, losing 16–17 (after golden point extra time) to the Redcliffe Dolphins on 14 September. Thomas Duffy was the team's top point-scorer with 142 points (3 tries, 65 goals), while Dane Aukafolau and Jensen Taumoepeau were joint top try-scorers with 10 tries each.

== Competitions ==
The Pride's first grade side competes in the QRL State competition, the Hostplus Cup. The club also field academy teams in the Auswide Bank Mal Meninga Cup U18, Cyril Connell Challenge U16, and women's teams in the Harvey Norman U19 and Harvey Norman U17.

- Hostplus Cup
- Auswide Bank Mal Meninga Cup U18
- Cyril Connell Challenge U16
- Harvey Norman (F) U19
- Harvey Norman (F) U17

== 2024 Season – Kenfrost Homes Northern Pride ==
- Competition: Hostplus Cup
- Sponsor: Kenfrost Homes.

=== Staff ===
==== Coaches/Trainers ====
- Coach: Eric Smith.
- Assistant coach: Sam Obst.
- Assistant coach: Will Bugden.
- Auswide Bank Mal Meninga Cup U-19 coach: Bevan Walker.
- Cyril Connell Challenge U-17 coach: Kris O'Farrell.
- Harvey Norman U-19 women's coach: Flori King-Smith.
- Harvey Norman U-17 women's coach: Elio Oberleuter.
- Strength and conditioning coach: Tim Holdsworth.
- First Aid Officer: Shane Jarvis.

==== Captains ====
- Captain: Kyle Schneider.
- Vice-captains: Ewan Moore and Evan Child.

==== Managers ====
- Football Operations Manager: Tanya Tully.
- Team Manager: Sam Harreman.
- CEO: Garreth Smith.
- Chairman: Terry Medhurst.
- Board Members: Joel Riethmuller (player representative), Micheal Luck (Cowboys representative), Mark Whitnall, Leon Yeatman, Stephen Devenish and Sarah Campbell, ?? (FNQRL representative), ?? (CDJRL representative).

== 2024 Squad ==
Backs

Seamus King-Smith – FB
Lachlan West – FB
Rhy Young – FB
Ashton Galea – FB
Nat McGavin – WG
Jenson Taumoepeau – WG
Will Partridge – WG
Rashaun Denny – CE
Bacho Salam – CE
Daniel Woodhouse – CE
Dantoray Lui – FE
Matthew Egan – HB
Harry Freebairn – HB

Forwards

Kyle Schneider (c) – HK
Evan Child (vc) – LK
Ewan Moore (vc) – SR
Josh Allen – PR
Ash Little – PR
Nick Lui-Toso – PR
Paea Pua – PR
Jaymon Moore – PR
Joseph Ratuvakacerivalu – PR
Taniela Ta'ufo'ou – SR
Feao Tongia – SR
Dane Aukafolau – SR
Terrence Casey-Douglas – SR
Sam Cramp – SR
Denzel King – HK
Christopher Ostwald – HK
Ryan Flegler – HK
Kenneth Fonoti – LK
Whyatt Barnes – LK

North Queensland Cowboys allocation

Braidon Burns* – CE
Marly Bitungane* – PR
Harrison Edwards* – LK, SR
Henry Teutau* – PR
Jake Clifford* – FE
Jack Gosiewski* – SR
Jodeci Baker-Tiraha* – CE
Kaiden Lahrs* – PR
Mason Kira* – SR
Robert Derby – WG
Tom Chester* – FB
Tom Duffy* – HB

Allocated but did not play for the Pride in 2024:
Coen Hess – PR
Griffin Neame – PR
Heilum Luki – SR
Jeremiah Nanai – SR
Kyle Feldt – WG
Murray Taulagi – WG
Sam McIntyre – LK
Scott Drinkwater – FB
Valentine Holmes – CE

=== Player gains ===
Player	From League	From Club	Notes
Nat McGavin – WG	Hostplus Cup	Brisbane Tigers	
Bacho Salam – CE	Hostplus Cup	Brisbane Tigers	
Lachlan West – FB	Hostplus Cup	Brisbane Tigers	Hastings Deering Colts 2023 Player of Year.
Kyle Schneider – HK	Hostplus Cup	Mackay Cutters	
Jensen Taumoepeau – WG	Knock-On Effect NSW Cup	Newtown Jets	
Joshua Allen – PR	Knock-On Effect NSW Cup	Canberra Raiders	2023 Apprentice of the Year.
Dane Aukafolau – SR	NRL Telstra Premiership	Newcastle Knights	
Joseph Ratuvakacereivalu – SR	FNQRL	Brothers Cairns	
Ashton Galea – FB	FNQRL	Innisfail Leprachauns	
Nick Lui-Toso – PR	Knock-On Effect Cup	Western Suburbs Magpies	Signed after Round 9

=== Player losses after 2023 season ===
Player	To League	To Club
Julian Christian	Hostplus Cup	Norths Devils
Bernard Lewis	Hostplus Cup	Townsville Blackhawks
Justin Frain	Hostplus Cup	Wynnum Manly Seagulls
Daniel Hindmarsh-Takyi	English RFL Super League	Castleford Tigers
Zane Knowles	(released)	
Mareko Daniel	(released)	
Ponepate Tongia	(released)	
Zac Vella	(released)	

=== Season launch ===
- Pre-Season Training: 13 November 2023.
- Season launch: Brothers World of Entertainment, 23 February 2024.

=== Jerseys ===
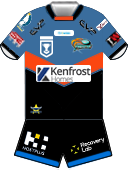
2024 primary Jersey

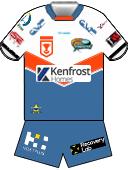
2024 alternative Jersey

=== Sponsors ===
- Kenfrost Homes
- Cairns Regional Council, Brothers Cairns
- North Queensland Cowboys, Pacific Toyota, Recovery Lab, Triple M 99.5, Totally Workwear, Goodline, OSE Group, GNB Energy, Skytrans, Your Fitness, EV2 Sportswear, Far North Physiotherapy, Crowies Paints, Status Signs, Terry White Chemmart, Coral Coast Laundry, Babinda Electrics, The Benson Hotel, Ringers Western, Mortgage Choice, Heightened Security, Smit Lamnalco.

=== Trial matches ===
Round	Opponent	Score	Date	Venue
Trial 1	Brothers Cairns	16 – 0	Saturday 17 February 2024	West Barlow Park, Cairns.
Trial 2	Townsville Blackhawks	20 – 12	Saturday 17 February 2024	West Barlow Park, Cairns.

Pre-season Trial 1a
Saturday, 17 February 2024
15:00 AEST (UTC+10)

Northern Pride	16 – 0	FNQRL Brothers Cairns
Tries: 4 Goals: (Tries not converted) 0		Tries: 0 Goals: 0

West Barlow Park, Scott St, Parramatta Park QLD 4870.

Kenfrost Homes Northern Pride: The full squad of 28 players participated in these two trial games, some in the 30 minute trial against Brothers, and the rest in the full 80-minute trial against the Blackhawks played immediately afterwards.
Coach: Eric Smith.
Brothers Cairns: FNQRL Premiers 2023.
Coach: Jordan Biondi-Odo.
- The game was two halves of 15 minutes each. Brothers then played a 30-minute game against the Townsville Blackhawks. Due to the limited time, tries were not converted.

Pre-season Trial 1b
Saturday, 17 February 2024
16:10 AEST (UTC+10)

Northern Pride	20 – 12	Townsville Blackhawks
Tries: 4 Goals: (Tries not converted) 0		Tries: 2 Goals: 0 (Tries not converted)

West Barlow Park, Scott St, Parramatta Park QLD 4870.

Kenfrost Homes Northern Pride: The full squad of 28 players participated, some in the first trial against Brothers, and the rest in the full trial against the Blackhawks.
Townsville and District Mendi Blackhawks: Lennix Tovo, Ratu Rotavisoro, Tyreece Woods, Eliot Zenon, Jesse Yallop, Matthew Wright, Jaelen Feeney, Tyreece Tonga, Josh Williams, Corey Walker, Trey Valentine, Jack Petit, Sean Bourke, Mckenzie Baker, Jale Riley, Dudley Dotoi, Bernard Lewis, Kalifa Fai Fai Loa, Jake Bourke, Christian Gale, Joel Baldwin, Nichola Brown, Edward Hampson, Will Wardle, Denzal Tonisee, Jaman Rio, Lachlen Lerch.
Coach: Terry Campese.
- The game was played in a torrential downpour, with 150 mm of rain recorded during the afternoon. Due to the limited time, tries were not converted.

=== Hostplus Cup matches ===
Round	Opponent	Score	Date	Venue
Round 1	Tweed Heads Seagulls	32 – 16	Saturday 9 March 2024	Barlow Park, Cairns.
Round 2	Brisbane Tigers	38 – 12	Saturday 16 March 2024	Barlow Park, Cairns.
Round 3	Townsville Blackhawks	18 – 10	Saturday 23 March 2024	Jack Manski Oval, Townsville.
Round 4	Sunshine Coast Falcons	32 – 10	Saturday 6 April 2024	Sunshine Coast Stadium, Kawana Waters.
Round 5	Redcliffe Dolphins	30 – 22	Saturday 13 April 2024	Kayo Stadium, Redcliffe.
Round 6	Norths Devils	38 – 12	Saturday 20 April 2024	Barlow Park, Cairns.
Round 7		BYE	Saturday 27 April 2024	
Round 8	Ipswich Jets	56 – 12	Saturday 5 May 2024	North Ipswich Reserve, Ipswich.
Round 9	Papua New Guinea Hunters	12 – 30	Saturday 11 May 2024	Santos National Football Stadium. Port Moresby.
Round 10	Mackay Cutters	52 – 6	Saturday 18 May 2024	BB Print Stadium, South Mackay.
Round 11	Souths Logan Magpies	40 – 22	Friday 24 May 2024	Queensland Country Bank Stadium, Townsville.
Round 12		BYE	Saturday 1 June 2024	
Round 13	Burleigh Bears	24 – 16	Saturday 8 June 2024	Barlow Park, Cairns.
Round 14	Western Clydesdales	22 – 42	Sunday 16 June 2024	Clive Berghofer Stadium, Toowoomba.
Round 15	Townsville Blackhawks	48 – 0	Saturday 22 June 2024	Barlow Park, Cairns.
Round 16	Mackay Cutters	20 – 12	Saturday 29 June 2024	Barlow Park, Cairns.
Round 17	CQ Capras	34 – 6	Saturday 6 July 2024	Barlow Park, Cairns.
Round 18	Brisbane Tigers	16 – 24	Saturday 13 July 2024	Totally Workwear Stadium, Brisbane.
Round 19	WM Seagulls	32 – 12	Saturday 27 July 2024	Country Week, John Street Oval, Cooktown
Round 20	Western Clydesdales	46 – 0	Saturday 3 August 2024	Barlow Park, Cairns.
Round 21	SC Falcons	38 – 18	Saturday 10 August 2024	Barlow Park, Cairns.
Round 22		BYE	Saturday 17 August 2024	
Round 23	Burleigh Bears	34 – 24	Saturday 24 August 2024	UAA Park, Gold Coast,

ROUND 1: Hostplus Cup 2024

Saturday
9 March 2024
15:45 AEST (UTC+10)

Northern Pride	32 – 16	Tweed Heads Seagulls
Tries: Nat McGavin (1') 1 Jenson Taumoepeau (6') 1 Bacho Salam (14', 35') 2 Seamus King-Smith (24') 1 Kyle Schneider (40') 1 Goals: Thomas Duffy (4 from 6) 4	1st: 26 – 4; 2nd: 6 – 12; Penalties: 3 – 6 ----- QRL Report	Tries: 1 Lindon McGrady (18'); 1 Tom Steadman (48'); 1 Harry Croker (56') Goals: 2 Lindon McGrady (2 from 3)

Barlow Park
(Severin Street, Parramatta Park QLD)
Referee: Taylor Worth.
Touch judges: Josh Eaton, Guy Millar.
Player of the Match: Jack Gosiewski*.

Kenfrost Homes Northern Pride: 1. Seamus King-Smith – FB 2. Nat McGavin – WG 3. Rashaun Denny – CE 4. Bacho Salam – CE 5. Jenson Taumoepeau – WG 6. Jake Clifford* – FE 7. Thomas Duffy* – HB 8. Ash Little – PR 9. Kyle Schneider (c) – HK 10. Josh Allen – PR 11. Ewan Moore (vc) – SR 12. Jack Gosiewski* – SR 13. Evan Child (vc) – LK
Interchange: 14. Dantoray Lui, – HB 15. Terrence Casey-Douglas, – SR 16. Marly Bitungane*, – SR 17. Paea Pua. – PR
Reserve: 18. Christopher Ostwald – HK
Cowboys allocation =* (4 players allocated for this match).
Unavailable: Will Partridge (injury).
Tweed Seagulls: 1. Lindon McGrady (c) – FB 2. Malakhi Donovan – WG 3. Brayden McGrady – CE 4. Harry Croker – CE 5. Ioane Seiuli – WG 6. Will Brimson – FE 7. Tom Steadman – HB 8. Iszac Fa'asuamaleaui* – PR 9. Vaka Sikahele – HK 10. Lamar Manuel-Liolevave – PR 11. Jacob Alick* – SR 12. Joe Vuna – SR 13. Jerome Veve – LK
Interchange: 14. Oskar Bryant*, 15. Luke Burton, 16. Jackson Owen, 17. Toby Marks.
Reserve: 18. Jayden Wright.
* = Titans allocation.
Coach: David Penna.
- Note: Gameday Sponsor: Survivor Golf.
  This was the Pride debut for captain Kyle Schneider, Nat McGavin, Bacho Salam, Jenson Taumoepeau and Josh Allen (Pride Players 214–219), and North Queensland Cowboys allocation players Jack Gosiewski*, Marly Bitungane* and Thomas Duffy* (Pride Players 217 & 220–221).

Position	Round 1 – 2024	P	W	D	L	B	For	Against	Diff	Points
2	Northern Pride	1	1	0	0	0	32	16	+16	2

ROUND 2: Hostplus Cup 2024

Saturday
16 March 2024
15:00 AEST (UTC+10)

Northern Pride	38 – 12	Brisbane Tigers
Tries: Josh Allen (8') 1 Kyle Schneider (16') 1 Bacho Salam (58') 1 Terrence Casey-Douglas (61') 1 Jenson Taumoepeau (68') 1 Ewan Moore (78') 1 Goals: Thomas Duffy (6 from 6) 6 Penalty Goal: Kyle Schneider 1	1st: 14 – 12; 2nd: 14 – 0 Penalties: 4 – 10 ----- QRL Report	Tries: 1 Coby Williamson (5'); 1 Chris McQueen (27') Goals: 2 Tristan Hope (2 from 2); Penalty Goal: 0

Barlow Park
(Severin Street, Parramatta Park QLD)
Referee: Tyson Brough.
Touch judges: Nathan Cornick, Guy Millar.
Player of the Match: Josh Allen.

Kenfrost Homes Northern Pride: 1. Seamus King-Smith – FB 2. Nat McGavin – WG 3. Jodeci Tiraha-Baker* – CE 4. Bacho Salam – CE 5. Jenson Taumoepeau – WG 6. Jake Clifford* – FE 7. Thomas Duffy* – HB 8. Ash Little – PR 9. Kyle Schneider (c) – HK 10. Josh Allen – PR 11. Ewan Moore (vc) – SR 12. Jack Gosiewski* – SR 13. Evan Child (vc) – LK
Interchange: 14. Dantoray Lui, – HB 15. Terrence Casey-Douglas, – SR 16. Marly Bitungane*, – SR 17. Paea Pua. – PR
Reserve: 18. Lachlan West
Cowboys allocation =* (4 players allocated for this match).
Unavailable: Will Partridge (injury).
Pride Ins: 18. Lachlan West (18th man), 3. Jodeci Tiraha-Baker* (Cowboys allocation replaces Rashaun Denny).
Pride Outs: 18. Christopher Ostwald (18th man), 3. Rashaun Denny.
Suzuki Brisbane Tigers: 1. Treigh Stewart – FB 2. Max Lehmann – WG 3. Thomas Rafter – CE 4. Marion Seve* – CE 5. Coby Williamson* – WG 6. Ryley Jacks (c) – FE 7. Jack Miers – HB 8. Jack Natapu – PR 9. Tristan Hope – HK 10. Tristan Powell* – PR 11. Chris McQueen – SR 12. Leivaha Pulu – SR 13. Samuel Wallis – LK
Interchange: 14. Caleb Daunt, 15. Bennett Leslie, 16. Moses Noovao-McGreal, 17. Nathan Kegg-King.
Reserve: 18. Tom McGrath.
Storm allocation = * (3 players allocated for this match).
Coach: Matt Church.
- Note: Brisbane Tigers were defending premiers.
  Gameday Sponsor: Totally Workwear.
  This was the Pride debut for the North Queensland Cowboys allocation player Jodeci Tiraha-Baker* (Pride Player 222).

Position	Round 2 – 2024	P	W	D	L	B	For	Against	Diff	Points
1	Northern Pride	2	2	2	0	0	70	28	+42	4

ROUND 3: Hostplus Cup 2024

Saturday
23 March 2024
17:00 AEST (UTC+10)

Townsville Blackhawks	10 – 18	Northern Pride
Tries: Dudley Dotoi 1 Bernard Lewis 1 Goals: Jake Bourke (1 from 2) 1 Penalty Goal: 0	1st: 6 – 10; 2nd: 4 – 8 Penalties: 9 – 8 ----- QRL Report	Tries: 2 Seamus King-Smith (11', 36'); 1 Evan Child (40'); Goals: 2 Thomas Duffy (2 from 3); Penalty Goal: 1 Thomas Duffy (58')

Jack Manski Oval
(Golf Links Drive, Kirwan, QLD)
Referee: Taylor Worth.

Kenfrost Homes Northern Pride: 1. Seamus King-Smith – FB 2. Nat McGavin – WG 3. Jodeci Tiraha* – CE 4. Bacho Salam – CE 5. Jenson Taumoepeau – WG 6. Jake Clifford* – FE 7. Thomas Duffy* – HB 8. Ash Little – PR 9. Kyle Schneider (c) – HK 10. Marly Bitungane* – PR 11. Ewan Moore (vc) – SR 12. Terrence Casey-Douglas – SR 13. Evan Child (vc) – LK
Interchange: 14. Paea Pua, – PR 15. Dantoray Lui, – HB 16. Dane Aukafolau, – SR 17. Whyatt Barnes. – LK
Reserve: 18. Rashaun Denny – CE
Cowboys allocation =* (4 players allocated for this match).
Pride Ins: Dane Aukafolau (new arrival), Rashaun Denny, Whyatt Barnes.
Pride Outs: Jack Gosiewski* (recalled to the Cowboys to replace injured Heilum Luki), Josh Allen, Lachlan West.
Change: Terrence Casey-Douglas (bench to second row), Marly Bitungane* (bench to front row).
Townsville & Districts Mendi Blackhawks: 1. McKenzie Baker – FB 2. Dudley Dotoi – WG 3. Bernard Lewis – CE 4. Gehamat Shibasaki – CE 5. Harry Quinlan – WG 6. Jaelen Feeney – FE 7. Jake Bourke – HB 8. Cade Maloney – PR 9. Joel Baldwin – HK 10. James Tamou – PR 11. Nicholas Halalilo – SR 12. Patrick Kaufusi – SR 13. Kyle Laybutt – LK
Interchange: 14. Curtis Dempsey, 15. Nick Brown, 16. Edward Hampson, 17. Richard Holani.
Reserve: 20. William Wardle.
Rabbitohs allocation = * (0 players allocated for this match).
Coach: Terry Campese.
- Note: This was the Pride debut for Dane Aukafolau (Player 223).

Position	Round 3 – 2024	P	W	D	L	B	For	Against	Diff	Points
1	Northern Pride	3	3	0	0	0	88	38	+50	6

ROUND 4: Hostplus Cup 2024

Saturday
6 April 2024
18:00 AEST (UTC+10)

Sunshine Coast Falcons	32 – 10	Northern Pride
Tries: Grant Anderson* (12') 1 Young Tonumaipea (20') 1 Sam Burns (44') 1 Thallon Peters (51') 1 Scott Galeano (63') 1 Luke Polselli (75') 1 Goals: Cody Hunter (4 from 6) 4	1st: 12 – 4; 2nd: 20 – 6 Penalties: 8 – 9 ----- QRL Report	Tries: 1 Bacho Salam (34'); 1 Jodeci Baker (70') Goals: 1 Thomas Duffy (1 from 2)

Sunshine Coast Stadium
(Sportsmans Parade, Bokarina, Kawana Waters, QLD)
Referee: Jack Ebert.

Kenfrost Homes Northern Pride: 1. Tom Chester* – FB 2. Nat McGavin – WG 3. Jodeci Tiraha* – CE 4. Bacho Salam – CE 5. Jenson Taumoepeau – WG 6. Jake Clifford* – FE 7. Thomas Duffy* – HB 8. Ash Little – PR 9. Kyle Schneider (c) – HK 10. Josh Allen – PR 11. Ewan Moore (vc) – SR 12. Terrence Casey-Douglas – SR 13. Evan Child (vc) – LK
Interchange: 14. Dantoray Lui, – HB 15. Dane Aukafolau, – SR 16. Kenneth Fonoti, – PR 17. Whyatt Barnes. – LK
Reserve: 18. Seamus King-Smith. – FB
Cowboys allocation =* (4 players allocated for this match).
Pride Ins: Tom Chester* (fullback), Josh Allen (front row), Kenneth Fonoti (bench)
Pride Outs: Seamus King-Smith (fullback), Marly Bitungane* (front row), Paea Pua (bench).
Changes: Seamus King-Smith (replaced by Tom Chester*), Marly Bitungane* replaced by Kenneth Fonoti.
SC Falcons: 1. Grant Anderson* – FB 2. Flynn Camilleri – WG 3. Kane Jackson – CE 4. Young Tonumaipea* – CE 5. Scott Galeano – WG 6. Luke Polselli* – FE 7. Cody Hunter – HB 8. Aaron Pene* – PR 9. Kyle Paterson – HK 10. – PR 11. Louis Geraghty – SR 12. Thallon Peters – SR 13. Sam Burns (c) – LK
Interchange: 14. Danny Heenan, 15. Jamie Hill, 16. Lazarus Vaalepu*, 17. Caius Faatili.
Reserve: 19. Nofoasa Malutoa.
Storm allocation = * (5 players allocated for this match).
Coach: Brad Henderson.
- Note: This was the Pride debut for North Queensland Cowboys allocation player Tom Chester* (Pride Player 224).

Position	Round 4 – 2024	P	W	D	L	B	For	Against	Diff	Points
3	Northern Pride	4	3	0	1	0	98	70	+28	6

ROUND 5: Hostplus Cup 2024 – GNB Energy Cup

Saturday
13 April 2024
18:00 AEST (UTC+10)

Redcliffe Dolphins	30 – 22	Northern Pride
Tries: Steven Numambo (33') 1 Aublix Tawha (49') 1 Trai Fuller (60') 1 Max Bailey (74') 1 Valynce Te Whare (78') 1 Goals: Joshua James (5 from 5) 5 Field Goal: 0	1st: 6 – 16; 2nd: 24 – 6 Penalties: 7 – 6 ----- QRL Report	Tries: 1 Nat McGavin (6'); 1 Josh Allen (16'); 1 Ewan Moore (19'); 1 Nat McGavin (65') Goals: 3 Thomas Duffy (3 from 4); Field Goal: 0 Thomas Duffy (0 from 1)

Kayo Stadium
(Klingner Road, Redcliffe, QLD)
Referee: Belinda Sharpe.

Kenfrost Homes Northern Pride: 1. Seamus King-Smith – FB 2. Nat McGavin – WG 3. Jodeci Tiraha-Baker* – CE 4. Bacho Salam – CE 5. Jenson Taumoepeau – WG 6. Jake Clifford* – FE 7. Thomas Duffy* – HB 8. Ash Little – PR 9. Kyle Schneider (c) – HK 10. Josh Allen – PR 11. Ewan Moore (vc) – SR 12. Dane Aukafolau – SR 13. Evan Child (vc) – LK
Interchange: 14. Chris Ostwald, – HK 15. Terrence Casey-Douglas, – SR 16. Marly Bitungane*, – SR 17. Whyatt Barnes. – LK
Reserve: 18. Seamus King-Smith – FB
(* = Cowboys allocation - 4 players allocated for this match).
Pride Ins: Seamus King-Smith (fullback), Chris Ostwald (bench), Marly Bitungane* (bench)
Pride Outs: Tom Chester* (fullback), Dantoray Lui (bench), Kenneth Fonoti (bench)
Changes: Terrence Casey-Douglas (second row to bench), Dane Aukafolau (bench to second row)
Redcliffe Dolphins: 1. Trai Fuller – FB 2. Steven Numambo – WG 3. Zane Camroux – CE 4. Valynce Te Whare – CE 5. Latrell Siegwalt – WG 6. Sean O'Sullivan – FE 7. Joshua James – HB 8. Nathan Watts – PR 9. Brent Woolf – HK 10. Max Bailey (c) – PR 11. Ob Tawha – SR 12. Sheldon Pitama – SR 13. Jaron Purcell – LK
Interchange: 14. Jackson Frei, 15. Ryan Jackson, 17. Tray Lolesior, 19. Harrison Graham.
Reserve: 20. Cooper Hewett.
* = NRL Dolphins allocation.
Coach: Ben Te'o

Position	Round 5 – 2024	P	W	D	L	B	For	Against	Diff	Points
8	Northern Pride	5	3	0	2	0	120	100	+20	6

ROUND 6: Hostplus Cup 2024

Saturday
20 April 2024
15:00 AEST (UTC+10)

Northern Pride	38 – 12	Norths Devils
Tries: Dane Aukafolau (2', 45') 2 Will Partridge (16', 25') 2 Jake Clifford* (30') 1 Nat McGavin (34') 1 Nat McGavin (51') 1 Lachlan West (69') 1 Goals: Thomas Duffy* (3 from 8) 3	1st: 24 – 0; 2nd: 14 – 12; Penalties: 11 – 7 ----- QRL Report	Tries: 1 Blake Paskins (55'); 1 James Flack (61') Goals: 1 Gerome Burns (56') (1 from 1); 1 Jack Wright (63') (1 from 1)

Barlow Park
(Severin Street, Parramatta Park, QLD)
Referee: Ben Watts

Kenfrost Homes Northern Pride: 1. Lachlan West – FB 2. Nat McGavin – WG 3. Will Partridge – CE 4. Bacho Salam – CE 5. Jenson Taumoepeau – WG 6. Jake Clifford* – FE 7. Thomas Duffy* – HB 8. Ash Little – PR 9. Kyle Schneider (c) – HK 10. Josh Allen – PR 11. Ewan Moore (vc) – SR 12. Dane Aukafolau – SR 13. Evan Child (vc) – LK
Interchange: 14. Chris Ostwald, – HK 15. Terrence Casey-Douglas, – SR 16. Marly Bitungane*, – WG 17. Whyatt Barnes. – LK
Reserve: 18. Denzel King – HK
(* = Cowboys allocation – 4 players allocated for this match).
Pride Ins: Will Partridge (centre), Lachlan West.
Pride Outs: Jodeci Baker*, Seamus King-Smith.
Norths Devils: 1. Julian Christian – FB 2. Blake Paskins – WG 3. Jordan Lipp – CE 4. Jacob Gagan – CE 5. Manase Kaho – WG 6. Gerome Burns – FE 7. Jack Wright – HB 8. Eddie Blacker – PR 9. Kierran Moseley (c) – HK 10. Tukimihia Simpkins – PR 11. James Flack – SR 19. Jeremiah Simbiken – SR 13. Sam Elliott – LK
Interchange: 14. Hayden Rowbotham, 15. Campbell Duffy, 16. Zach Brooks, 17. Cooper Jenkins.
Reserve: 18. Will Toloi.
* = Brisbane Broncos allocation
Coach: David Elliott.
- Note: Gameday Sponsor: Crowies Paints.
  This was the Pride debut for Lachlan West (Pride Player 225).

Position	Round 6 – 2024	P	W	D	L	B	For	Against	Diff	Points
4	Northern Pride	6	4	0	2	0	158	112	+46	8

ROUND 7: Hostplus Cup 2024

27–28 April 2024

Northern Pride	BYE

Position	Round 7 – 2024	P	W	D	L	B	For	Against	Diff	Points
4	Northern Pride	6	4	0	2	1	158	112	+46	10

ROUND 8: Hostplus Cup 2024

Saturday
5 May 2024
14:10 AEST (UTC+10)

Ipswich Jets	12 – 56	Northern Pride
Tries: Seth Nikotemo (2') 1 Dominic Macumboy (77') 1 Goals: Aaron Schoupp (2 from 2) 2	1st: 6 – 28; 2nd: 6 – 28; Penalties: 3 – 2 ----- QRL Report	Tries: 1 Jensen Taumoepeau (17'); 1 Thomas Duffy* (20'); 3 Lachlan West (27', 45' & 49'); 2 Dane Aukafolau (35' & 56'); 1 Dantoray Lui (39'); 1 Nat McGavin (63'); 1 Will Partridge (68'); Goals: 8 Thomas Duffy (8 from 10)

North Ipswich Reserve
(Ipswich, QLD)
Referee: Jordan Morel

Kenfrost Homes Northern Pride: 1. Lachlan West – FB 2. Nat McGavin – WG 3. Will Partridge – CE 4. Rashaun Denny – CE 5. Jenson Taumoepeau – WG 6. Dantoray Lui – FE 7. Thomas Duffy* – HB 8. Ash Little – PR 9. Kyle Schneider (c) – HK 10. Josh Allen – PR 11. Ewan Moore (vc) – SR 12. Dane Aukafolau – SR 13. Evan Child (vc) – LK
Interchange: 14. Chris Ostwald, – HK 15. Harrison Edwards*, – LK, SR 16. Terrence Casey-Douglas, – SR 17. Kaiden Lahrs*. – PR
Reserve: 18. Whyatt Barnes – LK
(* = Cowboys allocation – 4 players allocated for this match).
Pride Ins: Rashaun Denny (centre), Dantoray Lui (five-eighth), Harrison Edwards* (bench), Kaiden Lahrs (bench).
Pride Outs: Bacho Salam (centre), Jake Clifford* (five-eighth), Marly Bitungane (bench), Whyatt Barnes (bench).
Ipswich Jets: 1. Byron Johnson – FB 2. Flynn Groth – WG 3. Aaron Schoupp – CE 4. Bessie Toomaga – CE 5. Dominic Macumboy – WG 6. Jaylan De Groot – FE 7. Kyle Foxwell – HB 8. Jordan Penquitt – PR 9. Rhys Jacks – HK 10. Ben Liyou – PR 11. Seth Nikotemo – SR 12. Tate Rhea – SR 13. Kalin Ropata – LK
Interchange: 14. Clayton Mack, 15. Samuel Inoke, 16. Brett Greinke, 17. Max Banditt.
Reserve: 19. Bradley Zampech.
* = Sydney Roosters allocation (0 players allocated).
Coach: Ben Cross
- Note: This was the Pride debut for North Queensland Cowboys allocation players Harrison Edwards* and Kaiden Lahrs* (Pride Players 226 & 227).

Position	Round 8 – 2024	P	W	D	L	B	For	Against	Diff	Points
1	Northern Pride	7	5	0	2	1	214	124	+90	12

ROUND 9: Hostplus Cup 2024

Saturday
5 May 2024
15:00 PNG Pacific Time (UTC+10)

Papua New Guinea Hunters	30 – 12	Northern Pride
Tries: Sanny Wabo (15') 1 Alex Max (24') 1 Finley Glare (39') 1 Benji Kot (44') 1 Elijah Roltinga (79') 1 Goals: Finley Glare (5 from 5) 5	1st: 18 – 12; 2nd: 12 – 0 Penalties: ? – ? SinBin: Josh Allen ----- QRL Report	Tries: 2 Braidon Burns* (1' & 6') Goals: 2 Thomas Duffy* (2 from 2)

Santos National Football Stadium
(Port Moresby, PNG)
Referee: Ben Watts

Kenfrost Homes Northern Pride: 1. Lachlan West – FB 2. Nat McGavin – WG 3. Braidon Burns* – CE 4. Rashaun Denny – CE 5. Jenson Taumoepeau – WG 6. Dantoray Lui – FE 7. Thomas Duffy* – HB 10. Josh Allen – PR 9. Kyle Schneider (c) – HK 8. Terrence Casey-Douglas – PR 11. Ewan Moore (vc) – SR 12. Dane Aukafolau – SR 13. Evan Child (vc) – LK
Interchange: 8. Ash Little, – PR 14. Chris Ostwald, – HK 16. Kenneth Fonoti, – LK 17. Kaiden Lahrs*. – PR
Reserve: 18. Will Partridge – CE
(* = Cowboys allocation – 4 players allocated for this match).
Pride Ins: Braidon Burns* (centre), Kenneth Fonoti (bench).
Pride Outs: Harrison Edwards* (bench)
Changes: Will Partridge (centre to bench), Ash Little (front row to bench), Terrence Casey-Douglas (bench to front row).
SP PNG Hunters: 1. Sanny Wabo – FB 2. Brandon Nima – WG 3. Alex Max – CE 4. Elijah Roltinga – CE 5. Solo Wane – WG 6. Joshua Lau – FE 7. Finley Glare – HB 8. Valentine Richard – PR 9. Judah Rimbu – HK 10. Anthony Worot – PR 11. Whallan Tau-Loi – SR 12. Benji Kot – SR 17. Seal Kalo – LK
Interchange: 13. Ila Alu, 14. Robert Mathias, 15. Jordan Pat, 16. Koso Bandi.
Reserve: 18. Gairo Voro, 19. Joshua Mire, 20. Junior Tallinn.
Coach: Paul Aiton.
- Note: This was the Pride debut for North Queensland Cowboys allocation player Braidon Burns* (Pride Player 228).

Position	Round 9 – 2024	P	W	D	L	B	For	Against	Diff	Points
4	Northern Pride	8	5	0	3	1	226	154	+72	12

ROUND 10: Hostplus Cup 2024

Saturday
18 May 2024
18:00 AEST (UTC+10)

Mackay Cutters	6 – 52	Northern Pride
Tries: Jaxon Purdue (30') 1 Goals: Riley Dean (32') (1 from 1) 1	1st: 6 – 26; 2nd: 0 – 26; Penalties: ? – ? ----- QRL Report	Tries: 1 Terrence Casey-Douglas (6'); 1 Dantoray Lui (15'); 2 Rashaun Denny (20' & 23'); 1 Jensen Taumoepeau (36'); 1 Ewan Moore (42'); 2 Dane Aukafolau (49' & 68'); 1 Lachlan West (60'); 1 Seamus King-Smith (76'); Goals: 6 Thomas Duffy (6 from 10)

BB Print Stadium
(Bridge Road, South Mackay, QLD)
Referee: Jarrod Cole

Kenfrost Homes Northern Pride: 1. Lachlan West – FB 2. Nat McGavin – WG 3. Will Partridge – CE 4. Rashaun Denny – CE 5. Jenson Taumoepeau – WG 6. Dantoray Lui – FE 7. Thomas Duffy* – HB 8. Ash Little – PR 9. Kyle Schneider (c) – HK 15. Terrence Casey-Douglas – PR 11. Ewan Moore (vc) – SR 12. Dane Aukafolau – SR 13. Evan Child (vc) – LK
Interchange: 10. Nick Lui-Toso, – PR 14. Seamus King-Smith, – FB 16. Kaidan Lars*, – WG 17. Marly Bitungane*. – SR
Reserve: 18. Henry Teutau*
(* = Cowboys allocation – 4 players allocated for this match).
Pride Ins: Seamus King-Smith (bench), Nick Lui-Toso (bench), Marly Bitungane* (bench).
Pride Outs: Josh Allen (front row)-suspended (judiciary), Chris Ostwald (bench), Kenneth Fonoti (bench)
Changes: Rashaun Denny (centre to bench), Ash Little (bench to front row), Will Partridge (bench to centre)
Mackay Cutters: 1. Raydan Burns – FB 2. Augustus Rangihuna – WG 3. Kurt Fisher – CE 4. Mahe Fonua – CE 5. Josh Smith – WG 6. Riley Dean – FE 7. Jaxon Purdue* – HB 8. Ross Bella – PR 9. Jake Granville* – HK 14. D'Jazirhae Pua'avase – PR 11. Tom McNulty – SR 12. Jamal Shibasaki – SR 13. Hiale Roycroft (c) – LK
Interchange: 10. John Radel 15. Jai Hansen, 16. Brandon Russell, 17. Jeremiah Matautia.
Reserve: 18. Kauri Aupouri-Puketapu.
* = North Queensland Cowboys allocation
Coach: Michael Comerford.
- Note: Nick Lui-Toso (Pride Player No. 171) re-signed with the Pride. Lui-Toso played 32 games for the Pride over three seasons (2020–2022), before signing with St. George Illawarra Dragons to play in the Knock-On Effect NSW Cup.

Position	Round 10 – 2024	P	W	D	L	B	For	Against	Diff	Points
4	Northern Pride	9	6	0	3	1	282	160	+122	14

ROUND 11: Hostplus Cup 2024

Friday
24 May 2024
15:00 AEST (UTC+10)

Northern Pride	40 – 22	Souths Logan Magpies
Tries: Ewan Moore (4') 1 Thomas Duffy (10') 1 Will Partridge (20' & 41') 2 Jake Clifford (25' & 60') 2 Dane Aukafolau (47') 1 Goals: Thomas Duffy (6 from 7) 6	1st: 24 – 12; 2nd: 16 – 10; Penalties: 6 – 7 ----- QRL Report	Tries: 1 Ethan Quai-Ward (30'); 1 Blake Mozer (36'); 1 Va'a Semu (52'); 1 Kienan Tempest (78') Goals: 3 Brandon Finnegan (3 from 3); 0 Radean Robinson (0 from 1)

Queensland Country Bank Stadium
(Railway Estate, Townsville, QLD)
Attendance: 15,957
Referee: Josh Eaton.

Kenfrost Homes Northern Pride: 1. Tom Chester* – FB 2. Nat McGavin – WG 3. Will Partridge – CE 4. Braidon Burns* – CE 5. Jenson Taumoepeau – WG 6. Jake Clifford* – FE 7. Thomas Duffy* – HB 8. Ash Little – PR 9. Kyle Schneider (c) – HK 10. Harrison Edwards* – PR 11. Ewan Moore (vc) – SR 12. Dane Aukafolau – SR 13. Evan Child (vc) – LK
Interchange: 14. Dantoray Lui, – HB 15. Nick Lui-Toso, – PR 16. Kaidan Lars*, – WG 17. Marly Bitungane*. – SR
Reserve: 18. Lachlan West
(* = Cowboys allocation – 7 players allocated for this match).
Pride Ins: Tom Chester* (fullback), Braidon Burns* (centre), Jake Clifford* (five-eighth), Harrison Edwards* (front row).
Pride Outs: Lachlan West (fullback), Rashaun Denny (centre), Terrence Casey-Douglas (front row), Seamus King-Smith (bench).
Changes: Dantoray Lui (five-eighth to bench).
Souths Logan Magpies: 1. Braden Whittaker – FB 2. Denzel Samoa – WG 3. Ethan Quai-Ward – CE 4. Kienan Tempest – CE 5. Israel Leota – WG 6. Radean Robinson – FE 7. Brandon Finnegan – HB 8. Pride Petterson-Robati – PR 9. Blake Mozer – HK 10. Tevita Pangai Junior* – PR 11. Kobe Tararo – SR 12. Presley Sau – SR 13. Rory Ferguson – LK
Interchange: 14. Callum Eggerling, 15. William Samuel, 16. Va'a Semu, 18. Harry Walters.
Reserve: 17. Justin Fai.
* = Brisbane Broncos allocation
Coach: Karmichael Hunt.
- Note: This was a Pride home game that was played at the North Queensland Cowboys' ground, Queensland Country Bank Stadium in Townsville. The match was followed by the NRL game between the Cowboys and Wests Tigers, which the Cowboys won 42 – 28.

Position	Round 11 – 2024	P	W	D	L	B	For	Against	Diff	Points
3	Northern Pride	10	7	0	3	1	318	182	+136	16

ROUND 12: Hostplus Cup 2024

1–2 June 2024

Northern Pride	BYE

Position	Round 12 – 2024	P	W	D	L	B	For	Against	Diff	Points
2	Northern Pride	10	7	0	3	2	318	182	+136	18

ROUND 13: Hostplus Cup 2024

Saturday
8 June 2024
15:00 AEST (UTC+10)

Northern Pride
Tries:
Jensen Taumoepeau (22') 1
Dantoray Lui (31') 1
Lachlan West (54') 1
Ewan Moore (69') 1
Goals:
Thomas Duffy (33', 56', 71') (3 from 4) 3
Penalty Goal:
Thomas Duffy (76') 1
24 – 16
1st: 10 – 16
2nd: 14 – 0
Penalties: ? – ?
-----
QRL Report

Burleigh Bears
Tries:
1 Troy Leo (1')
1 Josh Rogers (16')
1 Kea Pere (27')

Goals:
2 Josh Rogers (18', 28') (2 from 3)
Penalty Goal:

Barlow Park
(Severin Street, Parramatta Park QLD)
Referee: Tyson Brough
Player of the Match: Ringer's Western Man of Match Tom Chester*

Kenfrost Homes Northern Pride: 1. Lachlan West – FB 2. Nat McGavin – WG 3. Will Partridge – CE 4. Tom Chester* – CE 5. Jensen Taumoepeau – WG 6. Dantoray Lui – FE 7. Thomas Duffy* – HB 8. Ash Little – PR 9. Kyle Schneider (c) – HK 10. Nick Lui-Toso – PR 11. Ewan Moore (vc) – SR 12. Dane Aukafolau – SR 13. Evan Child (vc) – LK
Interchange: 14. Daniel Woodhouse. – CE 15. Terrence Casey-Douglas, – SR 16. Kaiden Lahrs*, – PR 17. Marly Bitungane*. – SR
Reserve: 18. Seamus King-Smith
(* = Cowboys allocation – 3 players allocated for this match).
Pride Ins: Lachlan West (fullback), Daniel Woodhouse (reserve), Terrence Casey-Douglas (bench).
Pride Outs: Braidon Burns*, Harrison Edwards*, Jake Clifford* (called up to the Cowboys as six Cowboys were selected for Origin 1).
Changes: Tom Chester* (fullback to centre), Dantoray Lui (bench to five-eighth), Nick Lui-Toso (bench to front row)
Burleigh Bears: 1. Creedence Toia – FB 2. Troy Leo – WG 3. Sami Sauiluma (c) – CE 4. Kea Pere – CE 5. Nicholas O'Meley – WG 6. Josh Rogers – FE 7. Guy Hamilton – HB 8. Bailey Butler – PR 9. Pat Politoni – HK 10. Matthew Koellner – PR 11. Josh Patston – SR 12. Hayden Schwass – SR 13. Sam Coster – LK
Interchange: 14. Cole Geyer, 15. Charlie Murray, 16. Lochlyn Sheldon, 17. Ethan O'Neil.
Reserve: 18. Isaiah Latu.
* = Brisbane Broncos allocation
Coach: Luke Burt.

Position	Round 13 – 2024	P	W	D	L	B	For	Against	Diff	Points
2	Northern Pride	11	8	0	3	2	342	198	+144	20

ROUND 14: Hostplus Cup 2024

Saturday
16 June 2024
15:10 AEST (UTC+10)

Western Clydesdales	22 – 42	Northern Pride
Tries: Levi Helleur-Atiga (22', 63') 2 Corey Fenning (67') 1 Mac Puafisi (79') 1 Goals: Corey Fenning (3 from 4) 3	1st: 6 – 18; 2nd: 16 – 24; Penalties: ? – ? ----- QRL Report	Tries: 2 Will Partridge (13', 28'); 1 Dane Aukafolau (34'); 2 Tom Chester* (45', 71'); 1 Dantoray Lui 50'); 1 Lachlan West 57'); Goals: 7 Thomas Duffy (7 from 7)

Clive Berghofer Stadium
(Toowoomba, QLD)
Referee: Lachlan Sutton

Kenfrost Homes Northern Pride: 1. Lachlan West – FB 2. Nat McGavin – WG 3. Will Partridge – CE 4. Tom Chester* – CE 5. Jensen Taumoepeau – WG 6. Jake Clifford* – FE 7. Thomas Duffy* – HB 10. Nick Lui-Toso – PR 9. Kyle Schneider (c) – HK 16. Marly Bitungane* – PR 11. Terrence Casey-Douglas – SR 12. Dane Aukafolau – SR 13. Evan Child (vc) – LK
Interchange: 8. Ash Little, – PR 14. Dantoray Lui, – PR 15. Sam Cramp, – SR 17. Henry Teutau*. – PR
Reserve: 18. James Frazer.
(* = Cowboys allocation – 4 players allocated for this match).
Pride Ins: Jake Clifford* (five-eighth), Samuel Cramp (bench), Henry Teutau* (bench).
Pride Outs: Ewan Moore (second row), Daniel Woodhouse (bench), Kaiden Lahrs (bench).
Changes: Dantoray Lui (five-eighth to bench), Ash Little (front row to bench), Terrence Casey-Douglas (bench to second row), Marly Bitungane* (bench to front row).
Western Clydesdales: 1. Esom Ioka – FB 2. Kaden Buhse – WG 3. Corey Fenning – CE 4. Levi Helleur-Atiga – CE 5. Fua Schwalger – WG 6. Mac Puafisi – FE 7. Kai Duggan – HB 8. Emry Pere (c) – PR 9. Drew Timms – HK 10. Blake Lenehan – PR 11. Lopeti Mafi – SR 12. Takai Mokohar – SR 13. Neihana Oldham – LK
Interchange: 14. Hayden Ensbey, 15. Dylan White, 17. Penisimani Teaupa, 18. Todd White.
Reserve: 16. Darcy Carswell.
* = Canterbury-Bankstown Bulldogs allocation
Coach: Jason Alchin.
- Note: This was the Pride debut for Sam Cramp and North Queensland Cowboys' allocation player Henry Teutau* (Pride Players 229 & 230).

Position	Round 14 – 2024	P	W	D	L	B	For	Against	Diff	Points
2	Northern Pride	12	9	0	3	2	384	220	+164	22

ROUND 15: Hostplus Cup 2024

Saturday
22 June 2024
15:00 AEST (UTC+10)

Northern Pride	48 – 0	Townsville Blackhawks
Tries: Dantoray Lui (10'); Jensen Taumoepeau (18', 49'); Jake Clifford* (21', 77'); Will Partridge (24', 45'); Lachlan West (32'); Daniel Woodhouse (64'); Goals: Thomas Duffy* (6 from 9) 6	1st: 26 – 0; 2nd: 22 – 0 Penalties: ? – ? Sin Bins: Jayden Hodges (64'); James Tamou (77') ----- QRL Report	Tries: 0 Goals: 0

Barlow Park
(Severin Street, Parramatta Park, QLD)
Referee: Ben Watts

Kenfrost Homes Northern Pride: 1. Lachlan West – FB 2. Daniel Woodhouse – WG 3. Will Partridge – CE 20. Dantoray Lui – CE 5. Jensen Taumoepeau – WG 6. Jake Clifford* – FE 7. Thomas Duffy* – HB 8. Ash Little – PR 9. Kyle Schneider (c) – HK 10. Marly Bitungane* – PR 11. Ewan Moora (vc) – SR 12. Dane Aukafolau – SR 13. Evan Child (vc) – LK
Interchange: 14. Seamus King-Smith, – FB 15. Terrence Casey-Douglas, – PR 16. Whyatt Barnes, – LK 17. Henry Teutau*. – PR
Reserve: 18. Sam Cramp.
(* = Cowboys allocation – 4 players allocated for this match).
Pride Ins: Daniel Woodhouse (wing), Ewan Moore (second row), Seamus King-Smith (bench), Whyatt Barnes (bench).
Pride Outs: Nat McGavin (wing), Tom Chester* (centre), Nick Lui-Toso (front row), Samuel Cramp (bench).
Changes: Terrence Casey-Douglas (second row to bench), Ash Little (bench to front row), Dantoray Lui (bench to centre).
Townsville and Districts Mendi Blackhawks: 1. Lennix Tovo – FB 2. Ratu Jope Rotavisoro – WG 3. McKenzie Baker – CE 4. Gehamat Shibasaki – CE 5. Jake Riley – WG 6. Matthew Wright – FE 7. Bailey Biondi-Odo – HB 8. Cade Maloney – PR 9. Jayden Hodges – HK 10. Morgan McWhirter – PR 11. Edward Hampson – SR 12. Patrick Kaufusi – SR 13. Kyle Laybutt (c) – LK
Interchange: 14. Toby Thorburn, 15. Richard Holani, 16. James Tamou, 19. Nicholas Halalilo.
Reserve: 18. Jayden Sharp.
* = South Sydney Rabbitohs allocation
Coach: Terry Campese.
- Note: Kenfrost Homes Cup.

Position	Round 15 – 2024	P	W	D	L	B	For	Against	Diff	Points
1	Northern Pride	13	10	0	3	2	432	220	+212	24

ROUND 16: Hostplus Cup 2024

Saturday
29 June 2024
15:00 AEST (UTC+10)

Northern Pride	20 – 12	Mackay Cutters
Tries: Robert Derby (8', 63', 69') 3 Lachlan West (21') 1 Goals: Thomas Duffy (1 from 4) 1 Penalty Goal: Thomas Duffy (1 from 1) 1	1st: 10 – 0; 2nd: 10 – 12; Penalties: ? – ? ----- QRL Report	Tries: 1 Kauri Aupouri-Puketapu (45'); 1 Ross Bella (56'); Goals: 2 Riley Dean (2 from 2); Penalty Goal:

Barlow Park
(Severin Street, Parramatta Park, QLD)
Referee: Matt Gannon

Kenfrost Homes Northern Pride: 1. Lachlan West – FB 4. Robert Derby* – WG 2. Dantoray Lui – CE 3. Will Partridge – CE 5. Daniel Woodhouse – WG 6. Matthew Egan – FE 7. Thomas Duffy* – HB 8. Ash Little – PR 9. Kyle Schneider (c) – HK 10. Marly Bitungane* – PR 11. Ewan Moora (vc) – SR 12. Dane Aukafolau – SR 13. Evan Child (vc) – LK
Interchange: 14. Seamus King-Smith, – FB 15. Terrence Casey-Douglas, – PR 16. Kaiden Lahrs*, – PR 17. Henry Teutau*. – PR
Reserve: 18. Sam Cramp.
(* = Cowboys allocation – 3 players allocated for this match).
Pride Ins: Robert Derby* (wing), Matthew Egan (five-eighth), Kaiden Lahrs* (bench).
Pride Outs: Jenson Taumoepeau (wing), Jake Clifford* (five-eighth), Whyatt Barnes (bench).
Mackay Cutters: 1. Raydan Burns – FB 2. Brent Anderson – WG 3. Josh Smith – CE 4. Mahe Fonua – CE 5. Dario Takitaki – WG 6. Kauri Aupouri-Puketapu – FE 7. Riley Dean – HB 8. Josh Honan – PR 9. Jai Hansen – HK 10. John Radel – PR 11. Jamal Shibasaki – SR 12. Hiale Roycroft (c) – SR 15. Brandon Russell – LK
Interchange: 14. Xavier Kerrisk, 16. Tom McNulty, 17. D'Jazirhae Pua'avase, 18. Ross Bella.
Reserve: 19. Ethan Sweet.
* = North Queensland Cowboys allocation
Coach: Michael Comerford.

Position	Round 16 – 2024	P	W	D	L	B	For	Against	Diff	Points
2	Northern Pride	14	11	0	3	2	452	232	+220	26

ROUND 17: Hostplus Cup 2024

Saturday
6 July 2024
15:00 AEST (UTC+10)

Northern Pride	34 – 6	CQ Capras
Tries: Robert Derby* (20', 79') 2 Tom Chester* (25', 35') 2 Lachlan West (39') 1 Ewan Moore (50') 1 Goals: Thomas Duffy* (5 from 6) 5	1st: 24 – 0; 2nd: 10 – 6 Penalties: ? – ? ----- QRL Report	Tries: 1 Aaron Teroi (69') Goals: 1 Trey Brown (1 from 1)

Barlow Park
(Severin Street, Parramatta Park, QLD)
Referee: Josh Eaton
Player of the Match: Evan Child

Kenfrost Homes Northern Pride: 1. Lachlan West – FB 2. Robert Derby* – WG 2. Will Partridge – CE 18. Tom Chester* – CE 5. Jensen Taumoepeau – WG 6. Jake Clifford* – FE 7. Thomas Duffy* – HB 8. Ash Little – PR 9. Kyle Schneider (c) – HK 15. Nick Lui-Toso – PR 11. Ewan Moora (vc) – SR 12. Dane Aukafolau – SR 13. Evan Child (vc) – LK
Interchange: 10. Josh Allen, – PR 14. Dantoray Lui, – PR 16. Kaiden Lahrs*, – PR 17. Marly Bitungane*. – SR
Reserve: 4. Matt Egan.
(* = Cowboys allocation – 5 players allocated for this match).
Pride Ins: Tom Chester* (centre), Jenson Taumoepeau (wing), Jake Clifford* (five-eighth), Nick Lui-Toso (front row), Josh Allen (bench).
Pride Outs: Daniel Woodhouse (wing), Matthew Egan (five-eighth), Seamus King-Smith (bench), Terrence Casey-Douglas (bench), Henry Teutau* (bench).
Changes: Dantoray Lui (centre to bench), Marly Bitungane* (front row to bench).
Rockhampton Leagues CQ Capras: 1. Blake Moore – FB 2. Bob Tenza – WG 3. Cooper Marshall – CE 4. Robert Jennings* – CE 5. Edrick Lee – WG 6. Anthony Milford – FE 7. Jack Madden (c) – HB 8. Tyler Szepanowski – PR 9. Trey Brown – HK 10. Harrison Leonard – PR 11. Larson Dale-Doyle – SR 12. Tom Farr – SR 13. Lachlan Hubner – LK
Interchange: 14. Aaron Moore, 15. Aaron Teroi, 16. Kurtis Farr, 17. Michael Waqa.
Reserve: 18. Manu Sent.
* = Dolphins allocation
Coach: Lionel Harbin.
- Note: Indigenous Round Skytrans Cup. The Pride wore a special Indigenous jersey designed by Cooktown artist Bradley Michael. The circles in the middle of the jersey represent the communities affected by the December 2023 Wet Season floods, including Michael's home of Wujal Wujal. Footprints represent the travelling that was involved to help others in the flood, travelling away from family, community and rebuilding the community. Circles inside the weave are families that had to leave their homes to live elsewhere until it was safe enough to return home.

Position	Round 17 – 2024	P	W	D	L	B	For	Against	Diff	Points
1	Northern Pride	15	12	0	3	2	486	238	+248	28

ROUND 18: Hostplus Cup 2024

Saturday
14 July 2024
14:10 AEST (UTC+10)

Brisbane Tigers	16 – 24	Northern Pride
Tries: Asher O'Donnell (35') 1 Ronald Philitoga (49') 1 Tristan Hope (56') 1 Goals: Tristan Hope (2 from 3) 2	1st: 6 – 10; 2nd: 10 – 14; Penalties: 11 – 3 ----- QRL Report	Tries: 1 Jensen Taumoepeau (4'); 2 Will Partridge (27', 73'); 1 Rashaun Denny (63'); 1 Jake Clifford* (66'); Goals: 2 Thomas Duffy (2 from 5)

Totally Workwear Stadium
(Stones Corner, Brisbane, QLD)
Referee: Ben Watts

Kenfrost Homes Northern Pride: 1. Lachlan West – FB 2. Robert Derby* – WG 3. Will Partridge – CE 4. Rashaun Denny – CE 5. Jensen Taumoepeau – WG 6. Jake Clifford* – FE 7. Thomas Duffy* – HB 8. Ash Little – PR 9. Kyle Schneider (c) – HK 15. Nick Lui-Toso – PR 11. Ewan Moore (vc) – SR 12. Dane Aukafolau – SR 13. Evan Child (vc) – LK
Interchange: 10. Josh Allen, – PR 14. Dantoray Lui, – PR 16. Marly Bitungane*, – SR 17. Taniela Ta'ufo'ou. – SR
Reserve: 18. Daniel Woodhouse
(* = Cowboys allocation – 4 players allocated for this match).
Pride Ins: Rashaun Denny (centre), Taniela Ta'ufo'ou (bench), Daniel Woodhouse (bench).
Pride Outs: Tom Chester* (centre), Kaiden Lahrs* (bench).
Suzuki Brisbane Tigers: 1. Tahj Wood – FB 2. Ricco Falaniko – WG 3. Tony Thompson – CE 4. Coby Williamson – CE 5. Ronald Philitoga – WG 6. Ryley Jacks (c) – FE 7. Keagan Russell-Smith – HB 10. Leivaha Pulu – PR 9. Tristan Hope – HK 19. Jontay-Junior Betham-Misa – PR 11. Asher O'Donnell – SR 12. Moses Noovao-McGreal – SR 13. Tom McGrath – LK
Interchange: 14. Thomas Rafter, 15. Tristan Powell*, 16. Chris McQueen, 17. Nathan Kegg-King.
Reserve: 20. Bennett Leslie.
* = Melbourne Storm allocation
Coach: Matt Church.

Position	Round 18 – 2024	P	W	D	L	B	For	Against	Diff	Points
1	Northern Pride	16	13	0	3	2	510	254	+256	30

ROUND 19: Hostplus Cup 2024

Saturday
27 July 2024
15:30 AEST (UTC+10)

WM Seagulls	12 – 32	Northern Pride
Tries: Harry Armstrong (16') 1 Brendan Frei (79') 1 Goals: Bryce Donovan (2 from 2) 2	1st: 6 – 12; 2nd: 6 – 20; Penalties: 4 – 4 ----- QRL Report	Tries: 2 Thomas Duffy (8', 64'); 1 Dane Aukafolau (37'); 1 Braidon Burns (57'); 1 Ewan Moore (70'); 1 Will Partridge (73'); Goals: 4 Thomas Duffy (4 from 6)

John Street Oval
(Cooktown, QLD)
Referee: Jordan Morel

Kenfrost Homes Northern Pride: 1. Tom Chester* – FB 2. Robert Derby* – WG 3. Braidon Burns* – CE 4. Will Partridge – CE 5. Jensen Taumoepeau – WG 6. Jake Clifford* – FE 7. Thomas Duffy* – HB 10. Nick Lui-Toso – PR 9. Kyle Schneider (c) – HK 16. Josh Allen – PR 11. Ewan Moore (vc) – SR 12. Dane Aukafolau – SR 13. Evan Child (vc) – LK
Interchange: 8. Ash Little, – PR 14. Lachlan West, – PR 15. Dantoray Lui – FE 17. Marly Bitungane*. – SR
Reserve: 18. Kenneth Fonoti
(* = Cowboys allocation – 6 players allocated for this match).
Pride Ins: Tom Chester* (fullback), Braidon Burns* (centre).
Pride Outs: Rashaun Denny (centre), Taniela Ta'ufo'ou (bench), Daniel Woodhouse (bench).
Pride Changes: Lachlan West (fullback to bench), Ash Little (front row to bench), Josh Allen (bench to front row).
BMD Wynnum Manly Seagulls: 1. Matthew Milson – FB 2. Sione Hopoate – WG 3. Justin Frain – CE 4. Kurt Falls – CE 5. Fua Schwalger – WG 6. Kurt Falls – FE 7. Bryce Donovan – HB 8. Cooper Page-Wilson – PR 9. Cory Paix – HK 10. Brendan Frei (c) – PR 11. Harry Armstrong – SR 12. Luke Gale – SR 13. Oliver Pascoe – LK
Interchange: 14. Cameron Bukowski, 15. Joshua Stuckey, 16. Kalolo Saitaua, 17. Zac Hetherington.
Reserve: 20. Ethan Malt.
* = Brisbane Broncos allocation
Coach: Mathew Head.
- Note: Country Round.
  This was Ash Little's 50th game for the Pride.

Position	Round 19 – 2024	P	W	D	L	B	For	Against	Diff	Points
1	Northern Pride	17	14	0	3	2	542	266	+276	32

ROUND 20: Hostplus Cup 2024

Saturday
3 August 2024
15:00 AEST (UTC+10)

Northern Pride	46 – 0	Western Clydesdales
Tries: Tom Chester* (1', 40") 2 Robert Derby* (8') 1 Marly Bitungane* (17') 1 Will Partridge (24') 1 Terrence Casey-Douglas (29') 1 Braidon Burns* (32', 39') 2 Goals: 7 Thomas Duffy* (7 from 8)	1st: 40 – 0; 2nd: 6 – 0 Penalties: 4 – 5 ----- QRL Report	Tries: Goals:

Barlow Park
(Severin Street, Parramatta Park, QLD)
Referee: Matt Gannon
Player of the Match: Tom Chester*

Kenfrost Homes Northern Pride: 1. Tom Chester* – FB 2. Robert Derby* – WG 3. Will Partridge – CE 4. Braidon Burns* – CE 5. Jensen Taumoepeau – WG 6. Jake Clifford* – FE 7. Thomas Duffy* – HB 10. Marly Bitungane* – PR 9. Kyle Schneider (c) – HK 10. Nick Lui-Toso – PR 11. Ewan Moore (vc) – SR 12. Dane Aukafolau – SR 13. Evan Child (vc) – LK
Interchange: 14. Chris Ostwald, – HK 15. Terrence Casey-Douglas, – PR 16. Mason Kira*, – SR 17. Taniela Ta'ufo'ou. – SR
Reserve: 18. Nat McGavin
(* = Cowboys allocation – 7 players allocated for this match).
Pride Ins: Chris Ostwald (bench), Terrence Casey-Douglas (bench), Mason Kira* (bench), Taniela Ta'ufo'ou (bench), Nat McGavin (bench)'
Pride Outs: Josh Allen (front row), Ash Little (bench), Lachlan West (bench), Dantoray Lui (bench).
Pride Changes: Marly Bitungane (bench to front row)
Western Clydesdales: 1. Kaden Buhse – FB 2. Levi Helleur-Atiga – WG 3. Corey Fenning – CE 4. Esom Ioka – CE 5. Jerome Taulaga – WG 6. Luke Rouland – FE 7. Kai Duggan – HB 8. Emry Pere (c) – PR } 9. Drew Timms – HK 10. Blake Lenehan – PR 11. Lopeti Mafi – SR 12. Joshua Keoller – SR 13. Takai Mokohar – LK
Interchange: 14. Etelani Pouli, 15. Todd White, 16. Neihana Oldham, 17. Penisimani Teaupa.
Reserve: 20. Flynn Kaiser Capewell.
Coach: Jason Alchin.
- Note: Women in League Round. The Pride wore a special Women in League jersey.
  North Queensland Cowboys' allocation player, Tom Chester* was named Player of the Match with 422 run metres, two tries, a try assist, five line breaks, three line break assists, an offload, and 20 tackle busts.
  This was the Pride debut for North Queensland Cowboys' allocation player Mason Kira* (Pride Player 231).

Position	Round 20 – 2024	P	W	D	L	B	For	Against	Diff	Points
1	Northern Pride	18	15	0	3	2	588	266	+322	34

ROUND 21: Hostplus Cup 2024

Saturday
10 August 2024
15:00 AEST (UTC+10)

Northern Pride	38 – 18	SC Falcons
Tries: Jake Clifford* (30', 55') 2 Tom Chester* (44') 1 Evan Child (50') 1 Robert Derby* (52') 1 Jensen Taumoepeau (60') 1 Dantoray Lui (78') 1 Goals: Thomas Duffy (4 from 6) 4 Terrence Casey-Douglas (1 from 1) 1	1st: 4 – 12; 2nd: 34 – 6 Penalties: 5 – 4 ----- QRL Report	Tries: 2 Flynn Camilleri (6', 26'); 1 Louis Geraghty (71') Goals: 3 Cody Hunter (3 from 3)

Barlow Park
(Severin Street, Parramatta Park, QLD)
Referee: Daniel Schwass

Kenfrost Homes Northern Pride: 1. Tom Chester* – FB 2. Robert Derby* – WG 3. Will Partridge – CE 4. Braidon Burns* – CE 5. Jenson Taumoepeau – WG 6. Jake Clifford* – FE 7. Thomas Duffy* – HB 8. Marly Bitungane – PR 9. Kyle Schneider (c) – HK 10. Nick Lui-Toso – PR 11. Ewan Moore (vc) – SR 12. Dane Aukafolau – SR 13. Evan Child (vc) – LK
Interchange: 14. Dantoray Lui, – HB 15. Terrence Casey-Douglas, – PR 16. Mason Kira*, – WG 17. Taniela Ta'ufo'ou. – WG
Reserve: 18. Chris Ostwald
(* = Cowboys allocation – 7 players allocated for this match).
Pride In: Dantoray Lui (bench).
Pride Outs: Chris Ostwald (bench), Nat McGavin (bench).
SC Falcons: 1. Zacariah Miles – FB 2. Ammaron Gudgeon – WG 3. Taine Couper] – CE 4. Scott Galeano – CE 5. Flynn Camilleri – WG 6. Luke Polselli – FE 7. Cody Hunter – HB 10. Caius Faatili – PR 9. Danny Heenan – HK 18. Patrice Siolo – PR 11. Louis Geraghty – SR 12. Thallon Peters – SR 13. Sam Burns (c) – LK
Interchange: 14. Kyle Paterson, 15. Javvier Pitovao, 16. Kaleb Sutton, 18. Harrison McIndoe.
Reserve: 17. Jed Bignell.
* = Melbourne Storm allocation
Coach: Brad Henderson.
- Note: This was Terrence Casey-Douglas' 50th game for the Pride.

Position	Round 11 – 2024	P	W	D	L	B	For	Against	Diff	Points
1	Northern Pride	19	16	0	3	2	626	284	+342	36

ROUND 22: Hostplus Cup 2024

17–18 August 2024

Northern Pride	BYE

Position	Round 12 – 2024	P	W	D	L	B	For	Against	Diff	Points
1	Northern Pride	19	16	0	3	3	626	284	+342	38

ROUND 23: Hostplus Cup 2024

Saturday
24 August 2024
15:15 AEST (UTC+10)

Burleigh Bears	24 – 34	Northern Pride
Tries: Josiah Karapani (6') 1 Hayden Schwass (30') 1 Kea Pere (68') 1 Ethan O'Neill (76') 1 Goals: Guy Hamilton (4 from 4) 4	1st: 12 – 4; 2nd: 12 – 30; Penalties: ? – ? ----- QRL Report	Tries: 2 Dantoray Lui (19', 43'); 1 Nick Lui-Toso (53'); 1 Will Partridge (58'); 1 Ewan Moore (61'); 1 Dane Aukafolau (65'); Goals: 5 Thomas Duffy* (5 from 6)

UAA Park
(Miami, Gold Coast, QLD)
Referee: Nick Pelgrave

Kenfrost Homes Northern Pride: 1. Tom Chester* – FB 2. Robert Derby* – WG 3. Will Partridge – CE 4. Braidon Burns* – CE 5. Jensen Taumoepeau – WG 6. Dantoray Lui – FE 7. Thomas Duffy* – HB 8. Ash Little – PR 9. Kyle Schneider (c) – HK 10. Nick Lui-Toso – PR 11. Ewan Moore (vc) – SR 12. Dane Aukafolau – SR 16. Marly Bitungane* – LK
Interchange: 13. Evan Child (vc) – LK , 14. Lachlan West, – SR 15. Mason Kira*, – PR 15. Taniela Ta'ufo'ou. – SR
Reserve: 18. Daniel Woodhouse .
(* = Cowboys allocation – 5 players allocated for this match).
Pride Ins: Ash Little (front row), Lachlan West (bench), Daniel Woodhouse (bench).
Pride Outs: Jake Clifford (five-eighth, called up to play half-back for the Cowboys after coach Todd Payten dropped Chad Townsend), Terrence Casey-Douglas (bench)
Changes: Marly Bitungane* (front row to lock), Evan Child (lock to bench), Dantoray Lui (bench to five-eighth).
Burleigh Bears: 1. Saxon Innes – FB 2. Troy Leo – WG 3. Sami Sauiluma (c) – CE 4. Kea Pere – CE 5. Josiah Karapani – WG 6. Shannon Gardiner – FE 7. Guy Hamilton – HB 8. Bailey Butler – PR 9. Pat Politoni – HK 10. Fletcher Baker – PR 11. Charlie Murray – SR 12. Hayden Schwass – SR 13. Sam Coster – LK
Interchange: 14. Cole Geyer, 15. Ethan O'Neill, 16. Matthew Koellner, 17. Takitau Mapapalangi.
Reserve: 18. Nicholas O'Meley.
* = Brisbane Broncos allocation
Coach: Luke Burt.
- Note: The Pride wore a 2014 replica jersey commemorating the tenth anniversary of their Grand Final win.

Position	Round 13 – 2024	P	W	D	L	B	For	Against	Diff	Points
1	Northern Pride	20	0	3	3	660	308	+352	40	

=== 2024 Ladder ===
Pos	Team	Pld	W	D	L	B	PF	PA	PD	Pts	Qualification
1	Northern Pride	20	17	0	3	3	660	308	+352	40	Finals series
2	Norths Devils	20	13	0	7	3	615	396	+219	32	Finals series
3	Redcliffe Dolphins	20	13	0	7	3	616	414	+202	32	Finals series
4	Sunshine Coast Falcons	20	12	0	8	3	546	387	+159	30	Finals series
5	Papua New Guinea Hunters	20	12	0	8	3	602	595	+7	30	Finals series
6	Central Queensland Capras	20	10	2	8	3	474	452	+22	28	Finals series
7	Burleigh Bears	20	10	1	9	3	542	404	+138	27	Finals series
8	Wynnum Manly Seagulls	20	10	1	9	3	492	508	−16	27	Finals series
9	Townsville Blackhawks	20	10	1	9	3	418	500	−82	27	
10	Souths Logan Magpies	20	9	0	11	3	473	584	−111	24	
11	Brisbane Tigers	20	8	1	11	3	454	524	−70	23	
12	Mackay Cutters	20	8	0	12	3	474	543	−69	22	
13	Tweed Heads Seagulls	20	8	0	12	3	486	569	−83	22	
14	Ipswich Jets	20	6	0	14	3	388	578	−190	18	
15	Western Clydesdales	20	1	0	19	3	320	798	−478	8	

Source: QRL RLP

== Finals Series ==
The Northern Pride had a mixed finals campaign in 2024, ultimately falling short of the grand final in heartbreaking fashion.

Qualifying and elimination finals
31 Aug. Cairns
1	Northern Pride	38
4	SC Falcons	0
31 Aug. Port Moresby
5	PNG Hunters	23
8	Wynnum Manly Seagulls	8
31 Aug. Rockhampton
6	CQ Capras	32
7	Burleigh Bears	24
1 Sep. Brisbane
2	Norths Devils	46
3	Redcliffe Dolphins	18

Semi-finals
7 Sep. Sunshine Coast
SC Falcons	10
PNG Hunters	24
8 Sep. Redcliffe
CQ Capras	18
Redcliffe Dolphins	36

Preliminary finals
14 Sep. Cairns
Northern Pride	16
Redcliffe Dolphins	17
15 Sep. Brisbane
Norths Devils	46
PNG Hunters	30

Grand Final
22 Sep. Redcliffe
Norths Devils	34
Redcliffe Dolphins	20

=== Qualifying Final: Dominant Victory ===
Northern Pride 38 – 0 Sunshine Coast Falcons
Saturday, 31 August 2024 at Barlow Park, Cairns

The minor premiers delivered a commanding performance in the qualifying final, shutting out the Sunshine Coast Falcons 38–0 in front of their home crowd. This was the Pride's 13th consecutive win, extending their unbeaten run since Round 9 of the regular season. Halfback Thomas Duffy starred in the victory, scoring a try and converting all seven of his goal attempts. The comprehensive win gave Northern Pride a week off in the semi-finals and home ground advantage for the preliminary final.

Finals Week 1 – Qualifying Final

Saturday
31 August 2024
14:00 AEST (UTC+10)

Northern Pride	38 – 0	Sunshine Coast Falcons
Tries: Will Partridge (5') 1 Ash Little (27') 1 Mason Kira (33') 1 Jensen Taumoepeau (54') 1 Dantoray Lui (57') 1 Thomas Duffy (62') 1 Goals: Thomas Duffy (6 from 6) 6 Penalty Goals: Thomas Duffy (42') 1	1st: 18 – 0; 2nd: 20 – 0 QRL Report	Tries: Goals: Penalty Goals:

Barlow Park
(Severin Street, Parramatta Park, QLD)
Referee: Ben Watts

Kenfrost Homes Northern Pride: 1. Tom Chester* – FB 2. Robert Derby* – WG 3. Will Partridge – CE 4. Braidon Burns* – CE 5. Jensen Taumoepeau – WG 6. Dantoray Lui – FE 7. Thomas Duffy* – HB 8. Ash Little – PR 9. Kyle Schneider (c) – HK 10. Nick Lui-Toso – PR 11. Ewan Moore (vc) – SR 12. Dane Aukafolau – SR 16. Marly Bitungane* – LK
Interchange: 13. Evan Child (vc) – LK , 14. Lachlan West, – FB 15. Mason Kira*, – SR 17. Taniela Ta'ufo'ou – SR
Reserve: 18. Sam Cramp .
(* = Cowboys allocation – 6 players allocated for this match).
Pride Ins: Taniela Ta'ufo'ou (bench), Sam Cramp (Reserve).
Pride Outs: Daniel Woodhouse (bench), Terrence Casey-Douglas (bench).
SC Falcons: 1. Zacariah Miles – FB 2. Ammaron Gudgeon – WG 3. Taine Couper] – CE 4. Harrison McIndoe – CE 5. Scott Galeano – WG 6. Luke Polselli – FE 7. Cody Hunter – HB 10. Caius Faatili – PR 9. Kyle Paterson – HK 18. Javvier Pitovao – PR 11. Louis Geraghty – SR 12. Thallon Peters – SR 13. Sam Burns (c) – LK
Interchange: 14. Danny Heenan, 15. Jamie Hill, 16. Kaleb Sutton, 18. Matthew Baker.
Reserve: 19. Cruz Lasike.
* = Melbourne Storm allocation
Coach: Brad Henderson.

=== Preliminary Final: Golden Point Heartbreak ===
Northern Pride 16 – 17 Redcliffe Dolphins (after golden point extra time)
Saturday, 14 September 2024 at Barlow Park, Cairns

The Pride's season ended in devastating fashion when they lost to the Redcliffe Dolphins 16–17 in a golden point thriller. The match was tied at full time after 80 minutes, forcing extra time under golden point rules (where the next score wins). Dolphins halfback Joshua James scored a field goal in the 83rd minute to win the match and send Redcliffe through to the grand final. The Pride had led 16–10 after 80 minutes, with Thomas Duffy converting all six of his goal attempts plus two tries, but couldn't hold on in extra time.

Finals Week 3 – Preliminary Final

Saturday
14 September 31 August 2024
14:10 AEST (UTC+10)

Northern Pride	16 – 17	Redcliffe Dolphins
Tries: Tom Chester (55') 1 Will Partridge (63') 1 Goals: Thomas Duffy (6 from 6) 6	1st: 10 – 6; 2nd: 6 – 10; QRL Report	Tries: Latrell Siegwalt (15') 1 Josh Kerr (52') 1 Goals: Joshua James (1 from 2) 2 Field Goals: Joshua James (83') 1

Barlow Park
(Severin Street, Parramatta Park, QLD)
Attendance: 3,217
Referee: Ben Watts
Player of the Match: Joshua James (Redcliffe)

Kenfrost Homes Northern Pride: 1. Tom Chester* – FB 2. Robert Derby* – WG 3. Will Partridge – CE 4. Braidon Burns* – CE 5. Jensen Taumoepeau – WG 6. Dantoray Lui – FE 7. Thomas Duffy* – HB 8. Ash Little – PR 9. Kyle Schneider (c) – HK 10. Nick Lui-Toso – PR 11. Ewan Moore (vc) – SR 12. Dane Aukafolau – SR 16. Marly Bitungane* – LK
Interchange: 13. Evan Child (vc) – LK , 14. Lachlan West, – FB 15. Mason Kira*, – SR 17. Taniela Ta'ufo'ou – SR
Reserve: 18. Sam Cramp .
(* = Cowboys allocation – 6 players allocated for this match).
Pride Ins: Taniela Ta'ufo'ou (bench), Sam Cramp (Reserve).
Pride Outs: Daniel Woodhouse (bench), Terrence Casey-Douglas (bench).
Redcliffe Dolphins: 1. Latrell Siegwalt – FB 2. William Dobson – WG 3. John Fineanganofo – CE 4. Valynce Te Whare – CE 5. Steven Numambo – WG 6. Thomas Casey – FE 7. Joshua James – HB 8. Tray Lolesio – PR 9. Brent Woolf – HK 10. Josh Kerr – PR 11. Max Bailey (c) – SR 12. Jaron Purcell – SR 13. Sheldon Pitama – LK
Interchange: 14. James Walsh, 15. Nathan Watts, 16. Jackson Frei, 17. Harrison Graham.
Reserve: 18. Tauaalo Vaipulu.
* = NRL Dolphins allocation |- | Coach: Ben Te'o.

=== Finals Series Summary ===
- Finals Record: 1 win, 1 loss
- Points Scored: 54 (38 in qualifying final, 16 in preliminary final)
- Points Conceded: 17 (0 in qualifying final, 17 in preliminary final)
- Best Finals Performance: 38–0 qualifying final win (largest winning margin in the 2024 finals series)
- Ultimate Result: Eliminated in preliminary final, finished 3rd overall The Redcliffe Dolphins went on to lose the grand final 20–34 to the Norths Devils on 22 September 2024 at Kayo Stadium, Redcliffe.

== 2024 Northern Pride players ==
Pride player	Appearances	Tries	Goals	Field goals	Pts
Josh Allen	11	2	0	0	8
Dane Aukafolau	20	10	0	0	40
Jodeci Baker-Tiraha	4	1	0	0	4
Whyatt Barnes	7	0	0	0	0
Marly Bitungane*	15	1	0	0	4
Braidon Burns*	4	2	0	0	8
Samuel Cramp	3	0	0	0	0
Terrence Casey-Douglas	17	1	0	0	4
Tom Chester*	11	7	0	0	28
Evan Child (vc)	21	2	0	0	8
Jake Clifford*	13	5	0	0	20
Robert Derby*	7	4	0	0	16
Rashaun Denny	13	3	0	0	12
Thomas Duffy*	21	3	65	0	142
Matthew Egan	6	0	0	0	0
Kenneth Fonoti	11	0	0	0	0
Jack Gosiewski*	2	0	0	0	0
Seamus King-Smith	11	2	0	0	8
Ash Little	18	1	0	0	4
Dantoray Lui	16	5	0	0	20
Nick Lui-Toso	10	0	0	0	0
Nat McGavin	14	6	0	0	24
Ewan Moore (vc)	19	4	0	0	16
Chris Ostwald	12	1	0	0	4
Will Partridge	18	9	0	0	36
Kyle Schneider (c)	22	2	1	0	10
Bacho Salam	6	4	0	0	16
Jensen Taumoepeau	21	10	0	0	40
Henry Teutau*	3	0	0	0	0
Lachlan West	14	10	0	0	40
Daniel Woodhouse	11	1	0	0	4

=== North Queensland Cowboys who played for the Pride in 2024 ===
Cowboys player	Appearances	Tries	Goals	Field goals	Pts
Braidon Burns*	4	2	0	0	8
Tom Chester*	11	7	0	0	28
Jake Clifford*	13	5	0	0	20
Robert Derby*	7	4	0	0	16
Harrison Edwards*	4	0	0	0	0
Jack Gosiewski*	2	0	0	0	0
Kaiden Lahrs*	7	0	0	0	0
Marly Bitungane*	15	1	0	0	4
Henry Teutau*	3	0	0	0	0
