= Thomas Duffy =

Thomas or Tom Duffy may refer to:

- Thomas Duffy (VC) (1825–1868), Irish recipient of the Victoria Cross in 1857
- Thomas A. Duffy (1906–1979), New York politician and judge
- Thomas C. Duffy (born 1955), American composer and conductor of the Yale University Concert Band
- Thomas F. Duffy (born 1955), American actor
- Thomas J. Duffy, American designer/craftsman
- Thomas T. Duffy (1835–?), American politician
- Tom Duffy (hurler) (1894–1989), Irish hurler
- Tom Duffy (rugby league) (born 2003), Australian rugby league
- Tom Duffy (ringmaster) (1929–2022), Irish circus performer and ringmaster
  - Tom Duffy's Circus

== See also ==
- Thomas Gavan-Duffy (1867–1932), Irish trade unionist and politician
