= Wide Bay =

Wide Bay may refer to:

- Wide Bay, Papua New Guinea, a bay in New Britain
- Wide Bay (Queensland), a bay in Australia
  - Division of Wide Bay, an Australian Electoral Division in Queensland
  - Electoral district of Wide Bay, a former electorate of the Legislative Assembly of Queensland
  - Wide Bay–Burnett, a geographic region in Queensland
  - Auswide Bank formerly Wide Bay Bank
