= Rod Silva =

Australian rugby league footballer

Rodney Silva
Personal information
- Full name: Rodney Silva
- Born: 10 December 1967 (age 58) Penrith, New South Wales, Australia
- Height: 183 cm (6 ft 0 in)
- Weight: 84 kg (13 st 3 lb)

Playing information
- Position: Fullback
Club
Years	Team	Pld	T	G	FG	P
1988–94	Eastern Suburbs	92	34	0	0	136
1995–01	Canterbury Bulldogs	100	56	0	0	224
	Total	192	90	0	0	360
- Source: As of 23 October 2019
- Relatives: Braidon Burns (nephew); Anthony Mundine (nephew); Marlee Silva (daughter)

Rodney "Rocket" Silva is an Australian former professional rugby league footballer of indigenous background who played in the 1980s and 1990s for Eastern Suburbs and Canterbury-Bankstown.

== Playing career ==
Silva initially played rugby league for Eastern Suburbs between 1988 and 1994. He made his first grade debut for the club in round 20 1988 against the Gold Coast Giants at Seagulls Stadium.

Silva was named Dally M Fullback of the Year in 1993, but in 1995, Phil Gould joined Eastern Suburbs as coach and moved Silva to reserve grade, ultimately cutting him from the team.

In the middle of the 1995 season Silva joined the Canterbury-Bankstown Bulldogs and took their troubled fullback position, ultimately scoring the final try in Canterbury's grand final win against Manly-Warringah that September.

In the 1998 NRL season, Silva played 13 games as Canterbury finished ninth on the table and qualified for the finals. Canterbury proceeded to make the 1998 NRL Grand Final after winning four sudden death elimination matches in a row including the club's famous preliminary final victory over rivals Parramatta which is considered to be one of the greatest comebacks of all time. After being down 2—18 with less than 10 minutes remaining, Canterbury scored three tries including one by Silva to take the game into extra-time before winning the match 32—20.

The following week, Silva played at fullback for Canterbury in their loss to the Brisbane Broncos in the 1998 NRL Grand Final. Silva was also instrumental in Canterbury's Reserve Grade Grand Final win over the Penrith Panthers in 2000. Silva retired from professional rugby league in 2001. It has been remarked that he is the last of the pedigree of NRL players that also worked as police officers.
