= MyState =

Bank of Australia

MyState Limited
- Type: Public
- Traded as: ASX: MYS
- ISIN: AU000000MYS0
- Industry: Finance
- Predecessor: MyState Financial; Tasmanian Perpetual Trustees
- Founded: 2009
- Headquarters: Hobart, Tasmania, Australia
- Area served: Queensland; Tasmania
- Key people: Sandra Birkensleigh (Chair), Brett Morgan (Managing Director)
- Services: Deposit banking, insurance, private and commercial lending, wealth management
- Net income: $41 million (2025)
- Subsidiaries: MyState Bank, Tasmanian Perpetual Trustees, Auswide Bank
- Website: www.mystate.com.au

MyState Limited is an Australian financial group, headquartered in Hobart, Tasmania. It formed in 2009 following the merger of the Tasmanian Perpetual Trustees and MyState Financial. In 2011 it further purchased the Queensland-based Rock Building Society for $69 million. In October 2014, its largest section, MyState Financial received authorisation from the Australian Prudential Regulation Authority to rename itself to MyState Bank.

== History ==
MyState was founded as a credit union in Tasmania, Australia under the name Connect Credit Union, which was created from the merging of two credit unions, the Teachers, Police and Nurses Credit Union and Savings & Loans (Credit Union Cooperartive).

Connect Credit Union attempted to demutualise in 2003 but failed when just 13,000 of its members voted, unable to reach a quorum of 75% of members voting.

In 2007 the members of Tasmania's two largest credit unions agreed to a merger, creating MyState Credit Union out of Island State Credit Union and Connect Credit Union. In 2009 MyState Credit Union merged with Tasmanian Perpetual Trustees, demutualising at the same time to list on the Australian Securities Exchange.

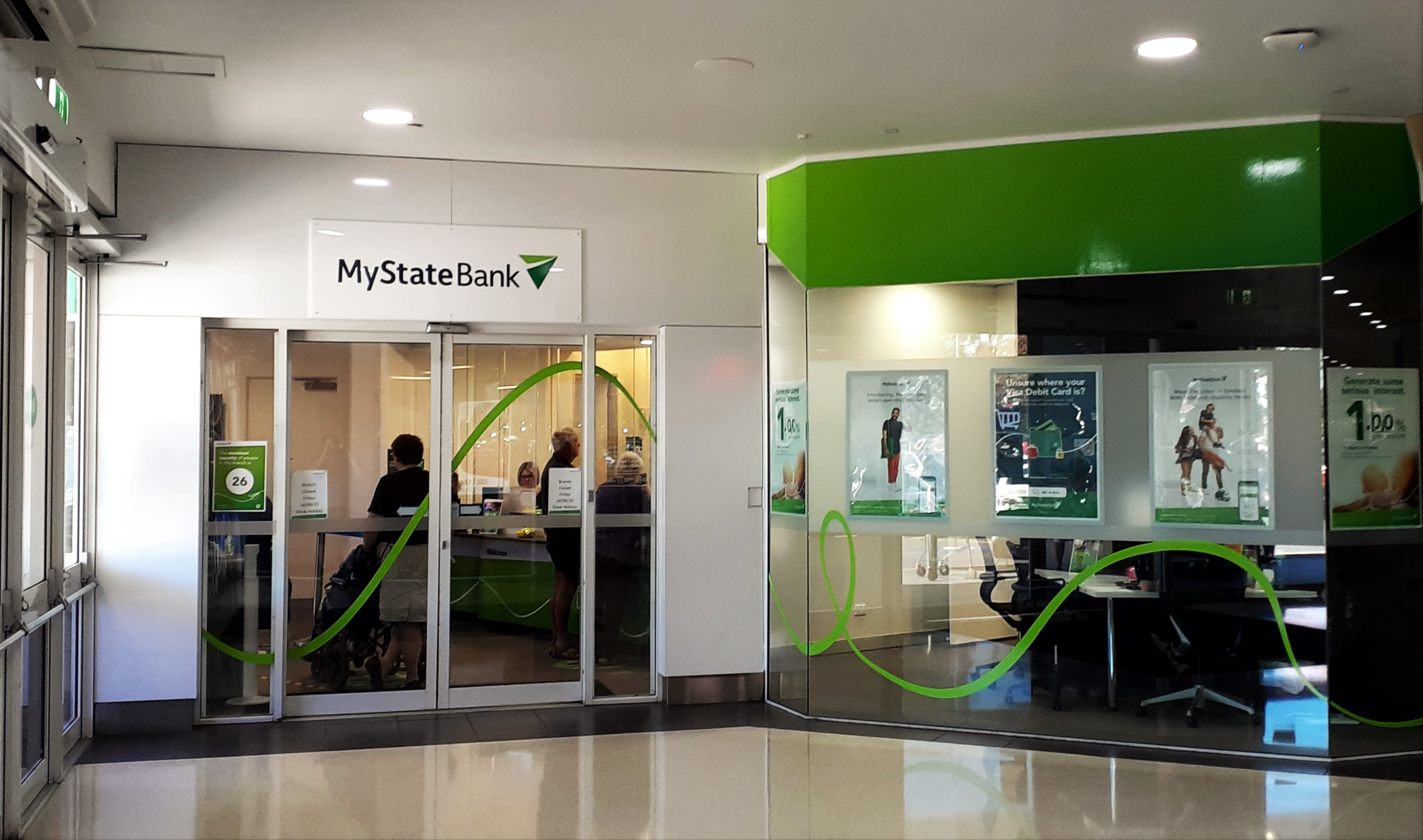
MyState Bank branch at Stockland Rockhampton in August 2020

In 2011, MyState purchased The Rock Building Society which had been established in Rockhampton, Queensland in 1967. Following the merger, MyState closed multiple branches of The Rock throughout the region including in Emerald, Biloela, Mount Morgan, Moura, Emu Park and Baralaba.

Despite the new ownership, The Rock Building Society retained its original name until its branches were rebranded in 2018 to MyState Bank. The Rock's regional executive manager Peter Fraser assured customers that despite the name change there would be no negatives associated with the rebrand such as branch closures or staff losses.

However, less than two years later, MyState announced all remaining Central Queensland branches of MyState Bank would close, with 26 staff in Rockhampton, Gladstone and Yeppoon losing their jobs. MyState bank claimed the decision was made due to the declining number of customers who visited branches in person, as well as the decrease in the use of cash during the COVID-19 pandemic.

The decision drew strong criticism from Rockhampton Regional Council mayor, Margaret Strelow who said she was "disgusted" by the decision and that she and her husband would be withdrawing their money from MyState Bank in protest. Strelow said it was "a timely reminder of the arrogance which we are treated when our businesses are taken over by large entities".

In August 2024 it was announced that MyState had sought to merge with Auswide Bank, another Queensland based regional bank similar to The Rock Building Society. On 19 February 2025, Auswide Bank merged with MyState Bank to become a wholly owned subsidiary of MyState Bank Limited, part of the MyState Limited Group.
