= Tom Duffy (ringmaster) =

Irish ringmaster and circus performer (1929–2022)

- Born: Thomas Duffy; 5 April 1929; Limavady, County Londonderry, Northern Ireland
- Died: 15 March 2022 (aged 92); Navan, County Meath, Ireland
- Occupation: Circus ringmaster
- Spouse: Gertrude "Gertie" Sinnott
- Children: 1

Thomas Duffy (5 April 1929 – 15 March 2022) was an Irish circus performer and ringmaster of Tom Duffy's Circus.

== Career ==
Duffy's circus career began at the age of five. He developed a double trapeze act with his brother Arthur and became known as "the Boy with the Iron Jaw" because of his ability to hold his brother from a leather strap placed between his teeth and 40 feet up in the air. Duffy was also a highly accomplished performer in the arena on horseback — in one act appearing as the Lone Ranger while riding a horse named Silver. Following the death of his parents, he ran the family circus with his six brothers. In 1979 Duffy created Tom Duffy's Circus.

== Personal life and death ==
Duffy suffered a series of health issues in his final years. He survived cancer twice, as well as three heart attacks which occurred in the weeks after he overcame the first of two bouts of COVID-19.

Duffy died on 15 March 2022, at the age of 92.
