= Tom Duffy's Circus =

Irish travelling circus

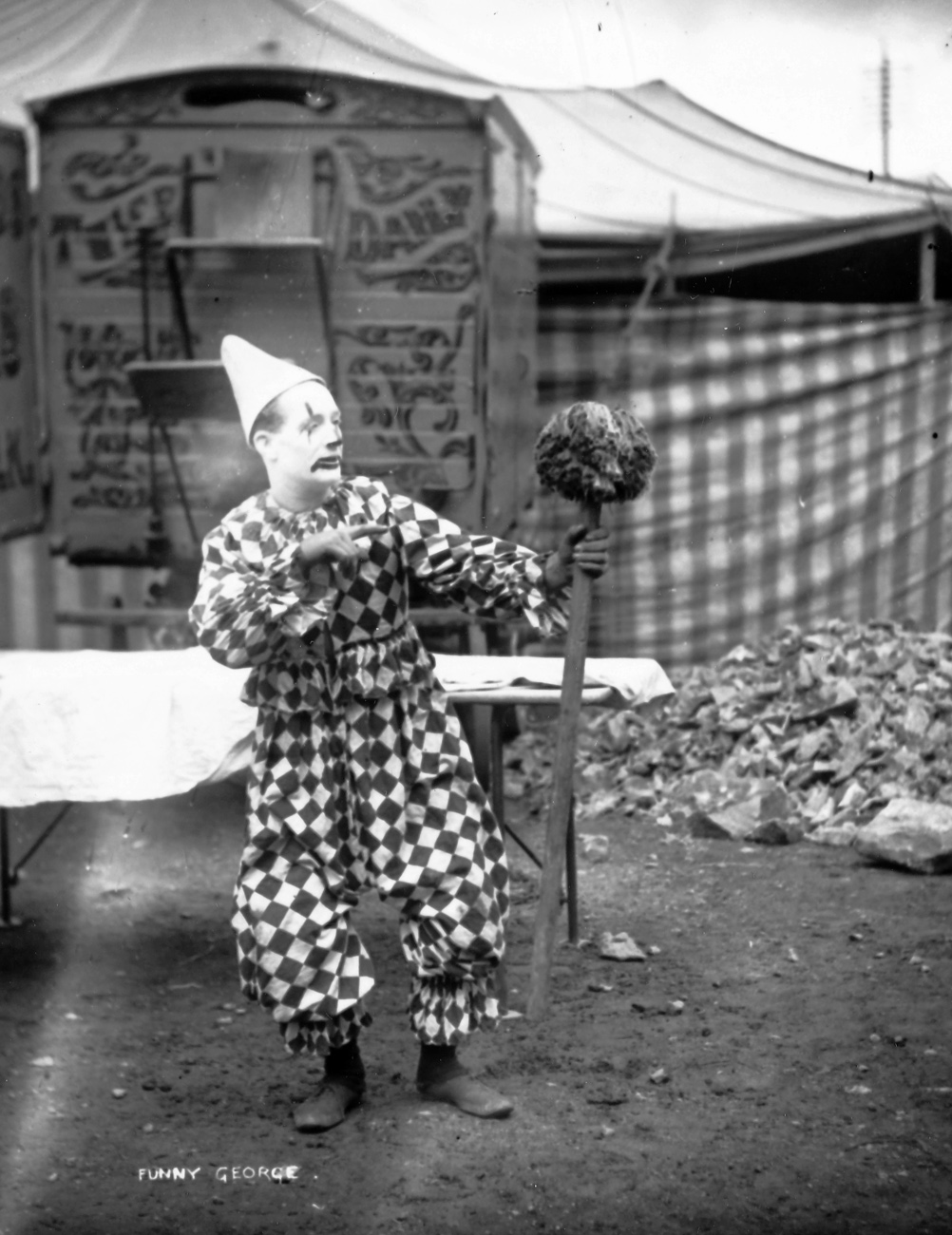
- Clown performing at Duffy's Circus in 1911

Origin
- Country: Ireland
- Founder(s): Tom Duffy
- Year founded: 1775; 250 years ago

Information
- Ringmaster(s): David Duffy
- Type of acts: Acrobats; contortionists; clowns; jugglers; trained animals; trampoline; trapeze
- Website: www.duffyscircus.com

Tom Duffy's Circus is an Irish family-run travelling circus, headquartered in Navan, County Meath, Ireland. It has one of the oldest big tops in the world, dating back to the 18th century.

== History ==
Duffy's Circus was originally founded in 1775. The Duffy family's involvement in circuses stretches back to a young shoemaker from Dublin, Patrick James Duffy, who performed as an acrobat in circuses in the 1840s in England. He had seven children, six of them got involved in the circus. In the 1870s, Duffy's second son, John, founded the John Duffy Circus. The family toured for three seasons before family divisions caused them to split in 1917 into two separate companies. Following John Duffy's death in 1956, the circus split between his son James and his uncle. By 1961, there was one company left which took another split, for Tom Duffy's Circus to come in existence. In the late 1970s, Tom Duffy became the owner and CEO of the circus.

Duffy's son David is the current ringmaster of the circus and is run by his sons, Tom and Jamie, the sixth generation of performers from their family. The circus includes acts from all over the world.

In 2018, Tom and Jamie won a Silver Clown Award at the Monte-Carlo Circus Festival in Monaco.

On 20 April 2020, owner and former ringmaster Tom Duffy tested positive for COVID-19 in his nursing home. He recovered one month later on 20 May. On 15 March 2022, it was announced that Duffy had died aged 92.

== 2018 Donegal circus incident ==
During a show in Donegal Town on 17 April 2018, a number of people were hurt when a trapeze artist fell through the safety net onto a number of people in the audience below. The performer and one audience member were injured, and were taken to Sligo University Hospital by two ambulances.

== See also ==
- List of circuses and circus owners
