= Braidon Burns =

Australian rugby league footballer (born 1996)

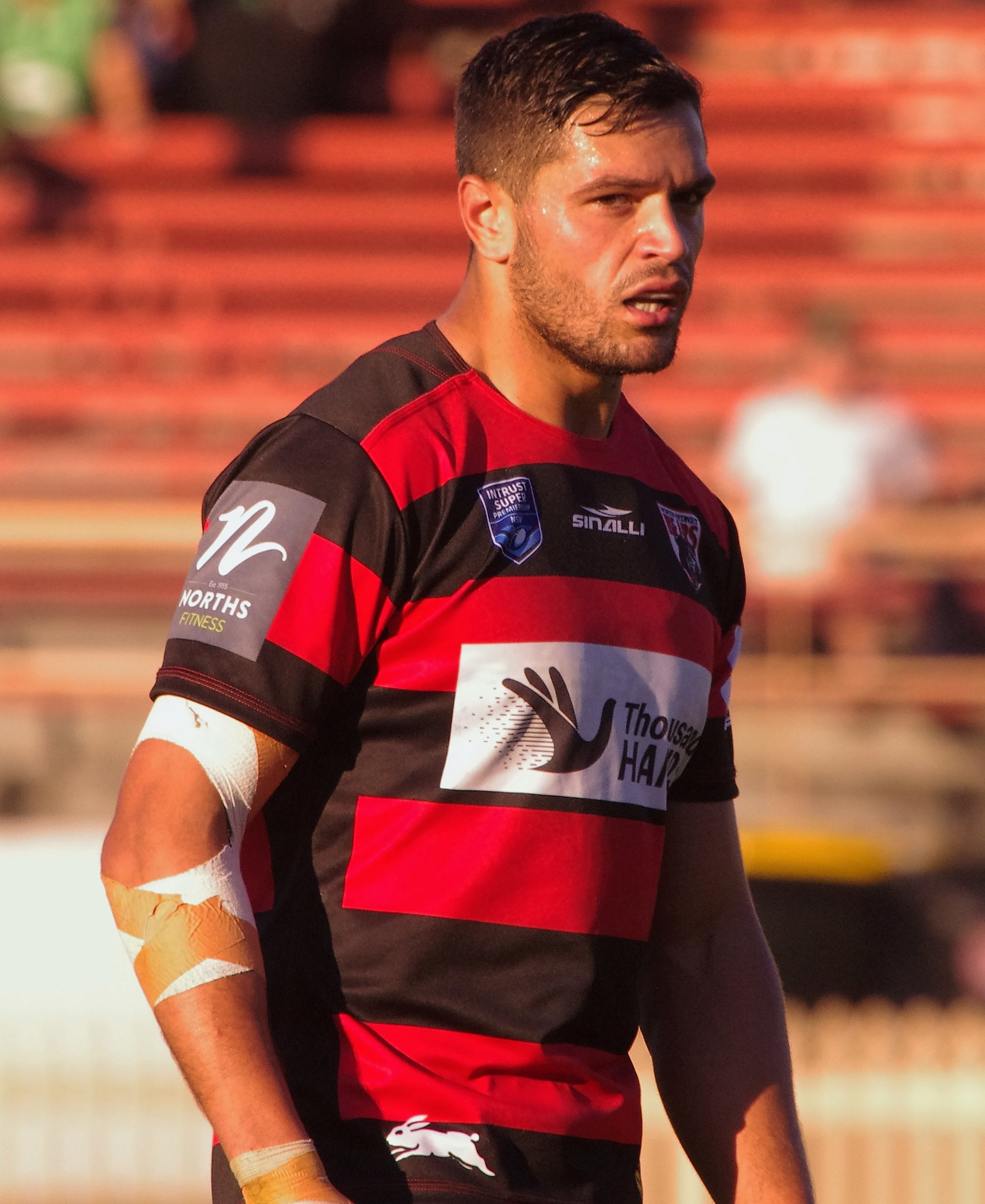

Personal information
- Born: 8 July 1996 (age 30) Dubbo, New South Wales, Australia
- Height: 187 cm (6 ft 2 in)
- Weight: 98 kg (15 st 6 lb)

Playing information
- Position: Centre, Wing
Club
Years	Team	Pld	T	G	FG	P
2017–21	South Sydney	40	10	0	0	40
2022–23	Canterbury Bulldogs	22	6	0	0	24
2024–	North Qld Cowboys	38	28	0	0	108
	Total	100	44	0	0	172
Representative
Years	Team	Pld	T	G	FG	P
2026	Prime Minister's XIII	1	0	0	0	0
- Source: As of 21 November 2026
- Relatives: Rod Silva (uncle)

Braidon Burns (born 9 July 1996) is an Australian professional rugby league footballer who plays as a centre or winger for the North Queensland Cowboys in the National Rugby League.

== Background ==
Burns was born in Dubbo, New South Wales, Australia, and is of Indigenous Australian descent. He is the nephew of Canterbury premiership winner, Rod Silva.

He played rugby union at St Josephs's College in Hunters Hill until year 10, and at St Stanislaus College in Bathurst for years 11 and 12. He played his junior rugby league for the Coonamble Bears. He was then signed by the Penrith Panthers.

== Playing career ==
=== Early career ===
In 2015 and 2016, Burns played for the Penrith Panthers' NYC team. In August 2016, he signed a two-year contract with the South Sydney Rabbitohs starting in 2017.

=== 2017 ===
In round 2 of the 2017 NRL season, Burns made his NRL debut for South Sydney against the Manly-Warringah Sea Eagles. In round 6 against Penrith, Burns endured a horror night after dropping multiple bombs from Nathan Cleary. Souths went on to win the match 21–20. Burns played the following week but then was left out of the side for eight weeks until managing to be recalled to the starting lineup for Souths round 15 clash against the Gold Coast.

=== 2018 ===
Burns made his first appearance of the season for Souths in the round 4 Good Friday match against Canterbury. Burns made a total of five appearances for Souths in 2018 but spent the majority of the season playing in reserve grade for North Sydney and did not feature in Souths finals campaign.

=== 2019 ===
Burns played a total of nine games for South Sydney in the 2019 NRL season as the club finished third on the table at the end of the regular season. Burns did not play in South Sydney's finals campaign.

=== 2020 ===
In round 8 of the 2020 NRL season, Burns was taken from the field during South Sydney's victory over Canterbury-Bankstown. It was later revealed that Burns had suffered a dislocated knee and would be ruled out for the season.

=== 2021 ===
In round 9 of the 2021 NRL season, Burns made his return to the South Sydney side where they were defeated 50–0 by Melbourne.

In round 22, Burns scored two tries for South Sydney in a 36–6 victory over the Gold Coast. On 5 October, Burns signed a two-year contract to join Canterbury starting in 2022.

=== 2022 ===
In round 1 of the 2022 NRL season, Burns made his club debut for Canterbury in their 6–4 victory against North Queensland at the Queensland Country Bank Stadium. In round 6, Burns was taken from the field during Canterbury's loss to South Sydney and was later ruled out for a month with a hamstring injury. Burns played a total of 14 matches for Canterbury throughout the year scoring four tries. Canterbury would finish the season in 12th place and miss the finals.

=== 2023 ===
Following Canterbury's victory over St. George Illawarra in round 9 of the 2023 NRL season, it was announced that Burns would be ruled out for at least six weeks with a medial ligament injury. Burns played a total of eight matches for Canterbury in the 2023 NRL season as the club finished 15th on the table.

=== 2024 ===
In 3 May, he joined the North Queensland Cowboys for the remainder of the season. In round 11 of the 2024 NRL season, he made his club debut for North Queensland and scored two tries in their 28–22 victory over one of his former teams in South Sydney.

=== 2025 ===
On 31 July, North Queensland announced that Burns had signed on for a further year with the team. Burns played 13 matches for North Queensland in the 2025 NRL season and scored seven tries as the club finished 12th on the table.

=== 2026 ===
On 19 May, North Queensland announced that Burns was re-signed by the club until the end of 2028. Burns played 21 games for the club in the 2026 NRL season and scored 16 tries as they finished 8th on the table. Burns played in their elimination finals loss to Cronulla.

He made his Prime Minister's XIII début on 3 October 2026 in the 10-60 win over PNG Prime Minister's XIII in Port Moresby.

== Statistics ==
Year	Team	Games	Tries	Pts
2017	South Sydney Rabbitohs	10	4	16
2018	South Sydney Rabbitohs	5	1	4
2019	South Sydney Rabbitohs	9	1	4
2020	South Sydney Rabbitohs	8	2	8
2021	South Sydney Rabbitohs	8	2	8
2022	Canterbury-Bankstown Bulldogs	14	4	16
2023	Canterbury-Bankstown Bulldogs	8	2	8
2024	North Queensland Cowboys	4	5	20
2025	North Queensland Cowboys	13	7	28
2026	North Queensland Cowboys	10	8	32
2027	North Queensland Cowboys			
	Totals	89	36	144
