= Tom Chester =

Australian professional rugby league player

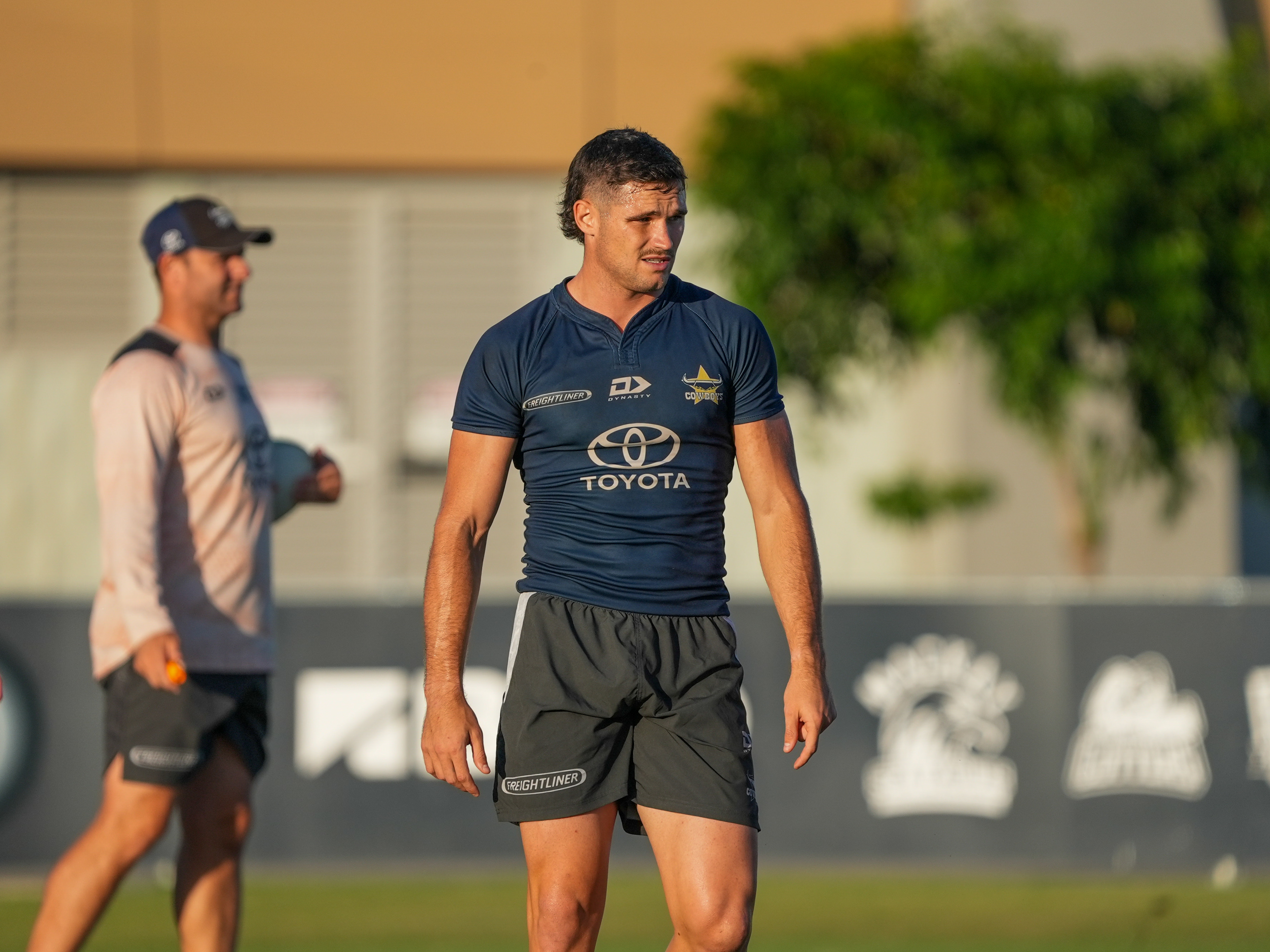

Personal information
- Full name: Tomas Chester
- Born: 11 May 2001 (age 25) Townsville, Queensland, Australia
- Height: 182 cm (6 ft 0 in)
- Weight: 89 kg (14 st 0 lb)

Playing information
- Position: Centre, Fullback
Club
Years	Team	Pld	T	G	FG	P
2022–	North Qld Cowboys	36	15	0	0	60
Representative
Years	Team	Pld	T	G	FG	P
2026	Prime Minister's XIII	1	1	0	0	4
- Source: As of 21 October 2026

Tomas Chester (born 11 May 2001) is an Australian rugby league footballer who plays as a centre or fullback for the North Queensland Cowboys in the National Rugby League (NRL).

== Background ==
Born in Townsville, Queensland, Chester played his junior rugby league for Norths Thuringowa Devils and Townsville Brothers. He attended Ignatius Park College.

== Playing career ==
=== Early career ===
In 2020, Chester played for the Townsville Brothers A-Grade side before signing for the North Queensland Cowboys.

In 2021, Chester joined the Cowboys' Young Guns squad and played for the Townsville Blackhawks Hastings Deering Colts side, starting at lock in their Grand Final loss to the Wynnum Manly Seagulls.

=== 2022 ===
In the 2022 pre-season, Chester joined the North Queensland NRL squad and played in their trial win over the South Sydney Rabbitohs, making the move to fullback. He then began the season playing for the Blackhawks in the Queensland Cup.

On 6 April, he re-signed with the North Queensland outfit until the end of the 2024 season.

In round 18 of the 2022 NRL season, he made his first grade debut off the bench against the Cronulla-Sutherland Sharks.

=== 2023 ===
On 2 May, it was announced that Chester would be ruled out for the remainder of the 2023 NRL season with an ACL injury.

=== 2024 ===
Chester played five games for North Queensland in the 2024 NRL season. On 20 December, the North Queensland club announced that Chester would miss the entire 2025 NRL season after he tore his ACL at a training session the week prior.

=== 2026 ===
On 18 April, the Townsville based outfit announced that Chester had re-signed with the club until the end of 2029. Chester played 24 games for North Queensland in the 2026 NRL season including their elimination final loss to Cronulla.

He made his Prime Minister's XIII début on 3 October 2026 in the 10-60 win over PNG Prime Minister's XIII in Port Moresby, scoring a try.

== Statistics ==
Year	Team	Games	Tries	Pts
2022	North Queensland Cowboys	1		
2023	North Queensland Cowboys	6	3	12
2024	North Queensland Cowboys	5	1	4
2026	North Queensland Cowboys	4	1	4
2027	North Queensland Cowboys			
	Totals	16	5	20
