= Kyle Schneider =

Scotland international rugby league footballer

Personal information
- Full name: Kyle John William Schneider
- Born: 7 February 2000 (age 26) Kanwal, New South Wales, Australia
- Height: 6 ft 0 in (1.84 m)
- Weight: 14 st 7 lb (92 kg)

Playing information
Representative
Years	Team	Pld	T	G	FG	P
2022–	Scotland	3	0	1	0	2
- Source: As of 17 November 2026

Kyle Schneider (born 7 February 2000) is a Scotland international rugby league footballer who plays as a hooker for the Mackay Cutters in the Queensland Cup.

== Background ==
Schneider was born in Kanwal, New South Wales, Australia. He is of Scottish descent.

Schneider played his junior rugby league with Parramatta and captained the SG Ball and Harold Matthews sides as they won both competitions. Schneider also captained the New South Wales Under 16's side in 2016. In 2017, Schneider was selected to represent the New South Wales Under 18's side. On 12 October 2020, Schneider was released by Parramatta.

== Playing career ==
=== Club career ===
Schneider played in 18 games, and scored 4 goals for the Mackay Cutters in the 2022 Queensland Cup. In December 2022, it was announced that Schneider had signed a train and trial contract with North Queensland ahead of the 2023 NRL season.

=== International career ===
In 2022 Schneider was named in the Scotland squad for the 2021 Rugby League World Cup. Schneider played all three games for Scotland at the 2021 Rugby League World Cup as they finished winless losing all three matches.
