= Jack Gosiewski =

Australian rugby league footballer

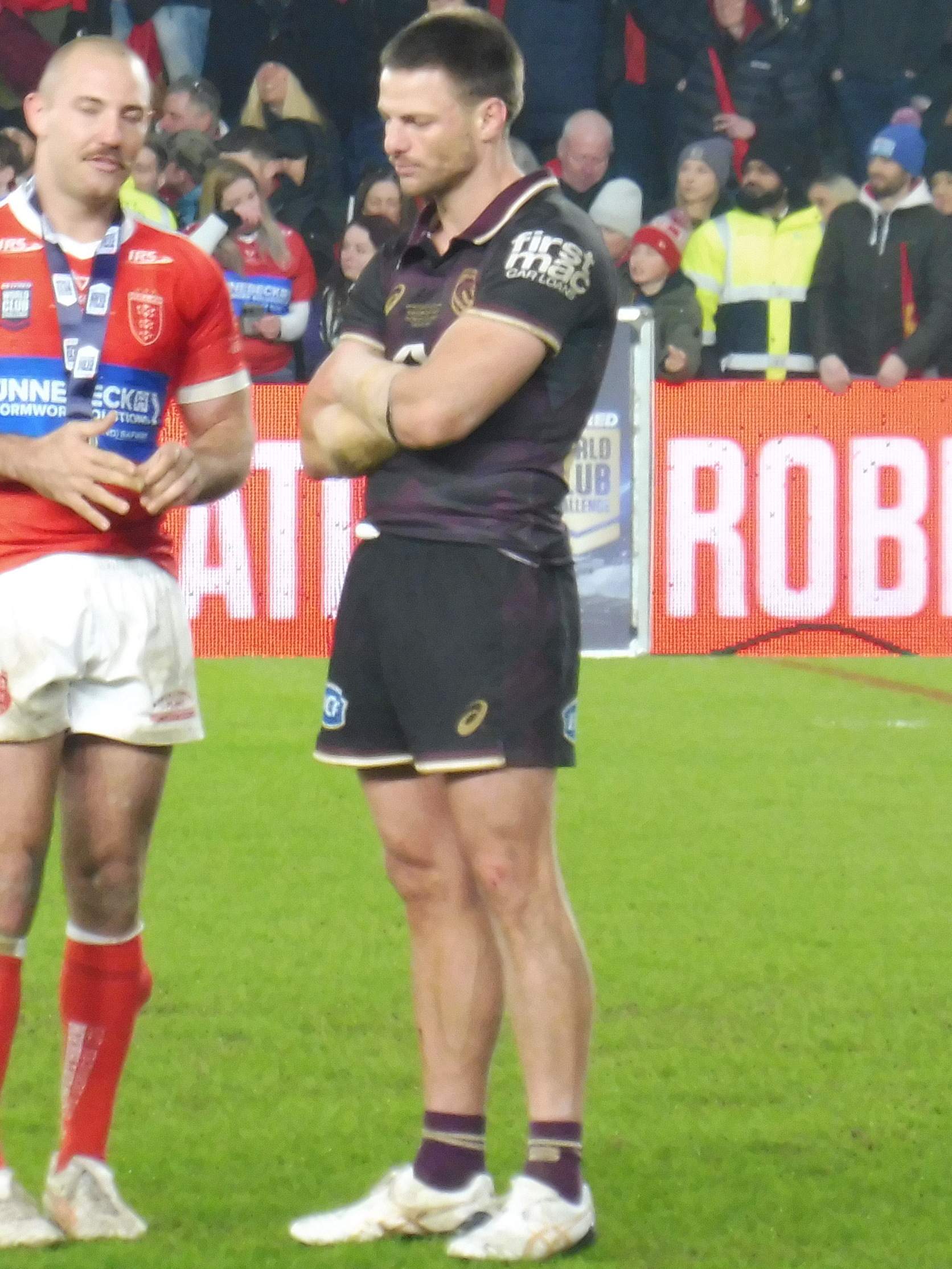

Personal information
- Born: 29 May 1994 (age 32) Murwillumbah, New South Wales, Australia
- Height: 190 cm (6 ft 3 in)
- Weight: 95 kg (14 st 13 lb)

Playing information
- Position: Second-row
Club
Years	Team	Pld	T	G	FG	P
2016–17	South Sydney	6	0	0	0	0
2018–21	Manly Sea Eagles	46	11	0	0	44
2022	St. George Illawarra	4	1	0	0	4
2023–24	North Qld Cowboys	12	2	0	0	8
2024–26	Brisbane Broncos	33	4	0	0	16
	Total	101	18	0	0	72
- Source: As of 27 August 2026

Jack Gosiewski (/ˈɡəʒuːski/; born 29 May 1994) is an Australian professional rugby league footballer who last played as a second-row forward for the Brisbane Broncos in the National Rugby League (NRL).

He previously played for the South Sydney Rabbitohs, Manly-Warringah Sea Eagles and the St. George Illawarra Dragons in the NRL.

== Background ==
Gosiewski was born in Murwillumbah, New South Wales, Australia. Gosiewski is of Polish descent.

He played his junior rugby league for the Mullumbimby Giants, before being signed by the South Sydney Rabbitohs.

== Playing career ==
=== Early career ===
In 2013 and 2014, Gosiewski played for the South Sydney Rabbitohs' NYC team, captaining the side in 2014. In 2015, he graduated to their New South Wales Cup team, North Sydney Bears. At the conclusion of the 2015 season, he played 18 games for North Sydney and scored 4 tries.

=== 2016 ===
In round 10 of the 2016 NRL season, Gosiewski made his NRL debut for South Sydney against the Parramatta Eels. He played a total of 5 games for South Sydney in 2016, for most of the season though, he featured for North Sydney, making 9 appearances and scoring 3 tries. In October, he re-signed with Souths on a one-year contract until the end of 2017.

=== 2017 ===
Gosiewski spent most of the 2017 NRL season out with a torn patella.

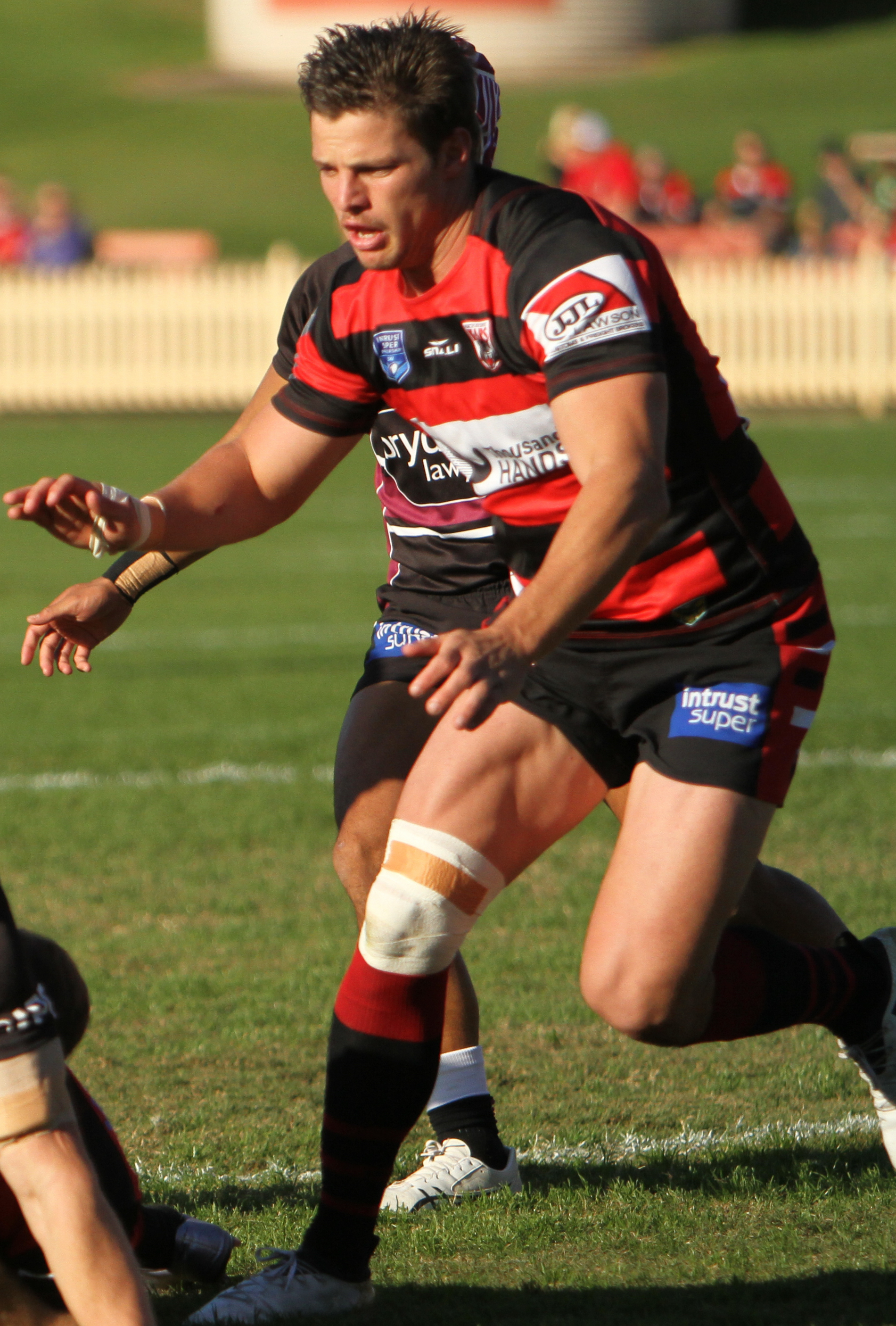
Gosiewski playing for the North Sydney Bears in May 2017

After getting match fitness and game time with South Sydney's feeder club North Sydney, he was recalled to the South Sydney lineup and played his sole NRL game of the season in South Sydney's 36-18 victory over the New Zealand Warriors. After not being offered a new contract by Souths, he signed a one-year contract in September, with the Manly-Warringah Sea Eagles starting in 2018.

=== 2018 ===
Gosiewski made his debut for Manly in round 5 against the Gold Coast Titans. Gosiewski featured in 8 games for Manly as the club endured a torrid 2018 season finishing second last on the table. Gosiewski resigned for the Manly Warringah Sea Eagles for another season, keeping him at the club until the end of 2019.

=== 2019 ===
In round 22 of the 2019 NRL season against Wests Tigers, Gosiewski scored two tries as Manly-Warringah won the match 32-12 at Brookvale Oval.

Gosiewski played 19 games for Manly in the 2019 NRL season as the club finished 6th on the table and qualified for the finals. Gosiewski played in both of Manly's finals matches and scored a try in the club's elimination final loss against South Sydney at ANZ Stadium.

=== 2020 ===
In round 19 of the 2020 NRL season, he scored two tries for Manly-Warringah in their 24-42 loss against the Gold Coast at Brookvale Oval.

He played a total of 13 games for Manly-Warringah in the 2020 NRL season as they finished a disappointing 13th on the table.

=== 2021 ===
Gosiewski played six games for Manly in the 2021 NRL season. On October 6, he was released by the Manly club. On October 15 Gosiewski signed a one-year deal with the St. George Illawarra Dragons for the 2022 season.

=== 2022 ===
Gosiewski played four games for St. George Illawarra in the 2022 NRL season as the club finished 10th on the table and missed the finals. On 25 October, Gosiewski signed a one-year deal to join North Queensland starting in 2023.

=== 2023 ===
Gosiewski was limited to only seven matches for North Queensland in the 2023 NRL season as the club finished 11th on the table.

=== 2024 ===
On 29 March, Gosiewski asked North Queensland for an immediate release on compassionate grounds which was rejected by the club. On 29 April, Gosiewski was granted an immediate release from his North Queensland contract to join arch-rivals Brisbane until the end of 2025. He made six appearances for Brisbane in the 2024 NRL season which saw the club miss the finals finishing 12th on the table.

=== 2025 ===
On 17 April, it was announced that Gosiewski would be ruled out for eight weeks with a fractured arm. He played 14 games for Brisbane in the 2025 NRL season but did not feature in the clubs finals campaign nor their 2025 NRL Grand Final victory over Melbourne. In mid-October, Brisbane announced that Gosiewski had signed on with the club for a further year.

=== 2026 ===
On 19 February, he played in Brisbane's World Club Challenge loss against Hull Kingston Rovers.

== Statistics ==
Year	Team	Games	Tries	Pts
2016	South Sydney Rabbitohs	5		
2017	South Sydney Rabbitohs	1		
2018	Manly Warringah Sea Eagles	8		
2019	Manly Warringah Sea Eagles	19	5	20
2020	Manly Warringah Sea Eagles	13	6	24
2021	Manly Warringah Sea Eagles	6		
2022	St. George Illawarra Dragons	4	1	4
2023	North Queensland Cowboys	7	2	8
2024	North Queensland Cowboys	5		
2024	Brisbane Broncos	6		
2025	Brisbane Broncos	14	4	16
2026	Brisbane Broncos	13		
	Totals	101	18	68
