= Harrison Edwards =

Australian rugby league footballer

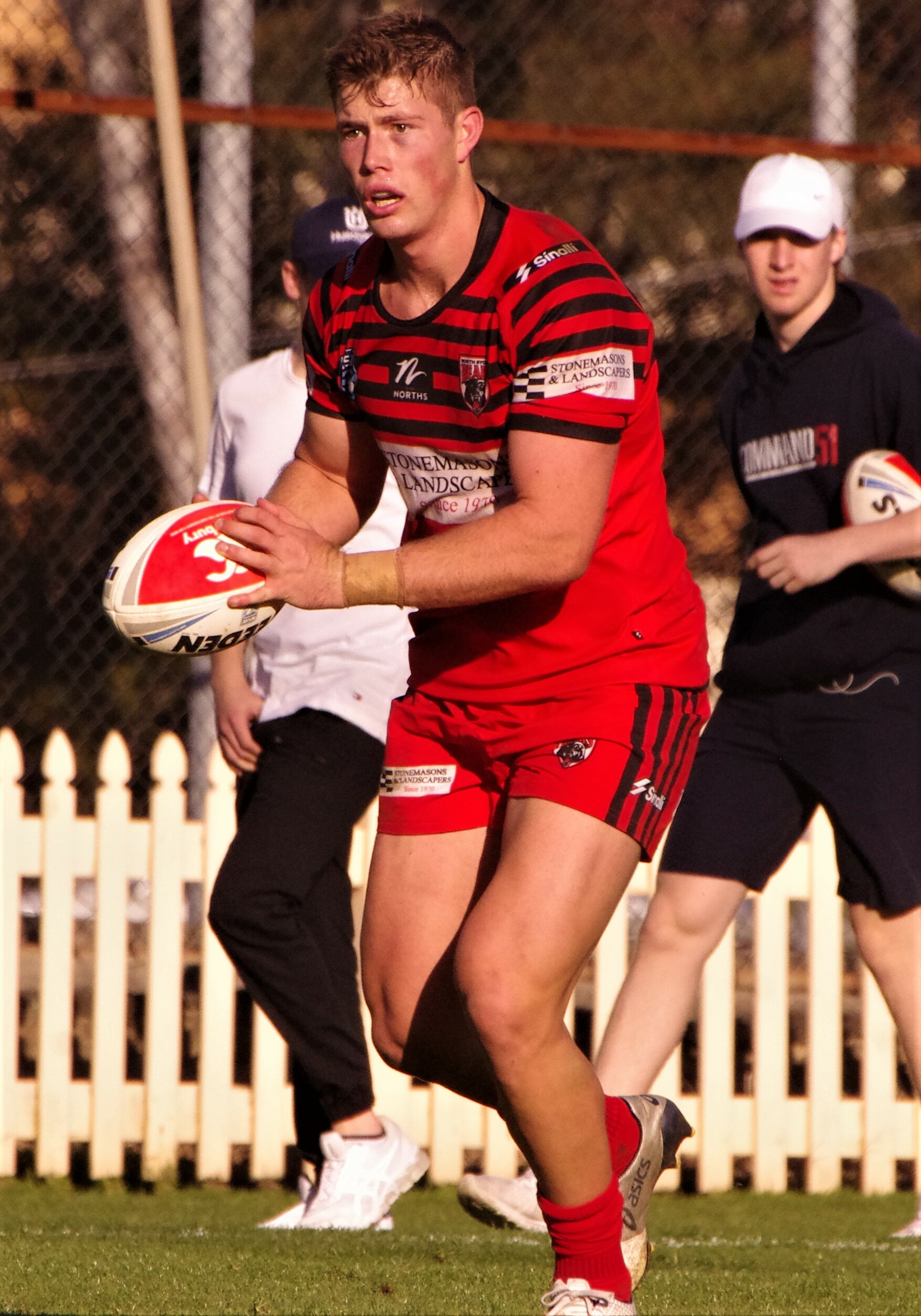

Personal information
- Born: 19 October 2000 (age 26) Penrith, New South Wales, Australia
- Height: 186 cm (6 ft 1 in)
- Weight: 96 kg (15 st 2 lb)

Playing information
- Position: Lock, Prop, Hooker
Club
Years	Team	Pld	T	G	FG	P
2022–24	Canterbury Bulldogs	17	1	0	0	4
2024–26	North Queensland	37	0	0	0	0
2026–	Parramatta Eels	12	0	0	0	0
	Total	66	1	0	0	4
Representative
Years	Team	Pld	T	G	FG	P
2025	Prime Minister's XIII	1	0	0	0	0
- Source: As of 6 September 2026

Harrison Edwards (born 19 October 2000) is an Australian professional rugby league footballer who plays as a lock, hooker, and prop forward for the Parramatta Eels in the National Rugby League (NRL).

He previously played for the Canterbury-Bankstown Bulldogs.

== Background ==
Edwards was born in Penrith, New South Wales and raised in the Mid North Coast town of Pacific Palms. He played his junior rugby league for the Forster Tuncurry Hawks.

== Playing career ==
In 2018 and 2019, Edwards played for the Sydney Roosters in the Jersey Flegg Cup.

After that he played in the NSW Cup for the North Sydney Bears, making seven appearances during the 2021 season, before moving to the Canterbury-Bankstown Bulldogs.

Edwards made his first-grade debut from the bench in Canterbury's 24–10 victory over the Newcastle Knights in round 20 of the 2022 NRL season.

In April 2024 after playing 17 NRL matches with the club, Edwards was released by the Canterbury club, immediately signing a long-term contract with the North Queensland Cowboys. Edwards appeared in 15 games for North Queensland in the 2024 NRL season as they finished 5th on the table. He played in both finals matches for North Queensland as they were eliminated in the second week by Cronulla. Edwards played 21 matches for North Queensland in the 2025 NRL season as the club finished 12th on the table.

=== 2025 ===
On 12 October 2025, he made his debut for the Prime Minister's XIII in their 28-10 win over PNG Prime Minister's XIII in Port Moresby

=== 2026 ===
On 6 May, Parramatta announced that they had signed Edwards for the rest of 2026 and the 2027 season after being released by the North Queensland club. He made his club debut for Parramatta in round 13 of the 2026 NRL season against Newcastle.

== Statistics ==
Year	Team	Games	Tries	Pts
2022	Canterbury-Bankstown Bulldogs	4		
2023	Canterbury-Bankstown Bulldogs	12	1	4
2024	Canterbury-Bankstown Bulldogs	1		
2024	North Queensland Cowboys	15		
2025	North Queensland Cowboys	21		
2026	North Queensland Cowboys	1		
2026	Parramatta Eels			
	Totals	54	1	4
