= Auswide Bank =

Australian retail bank

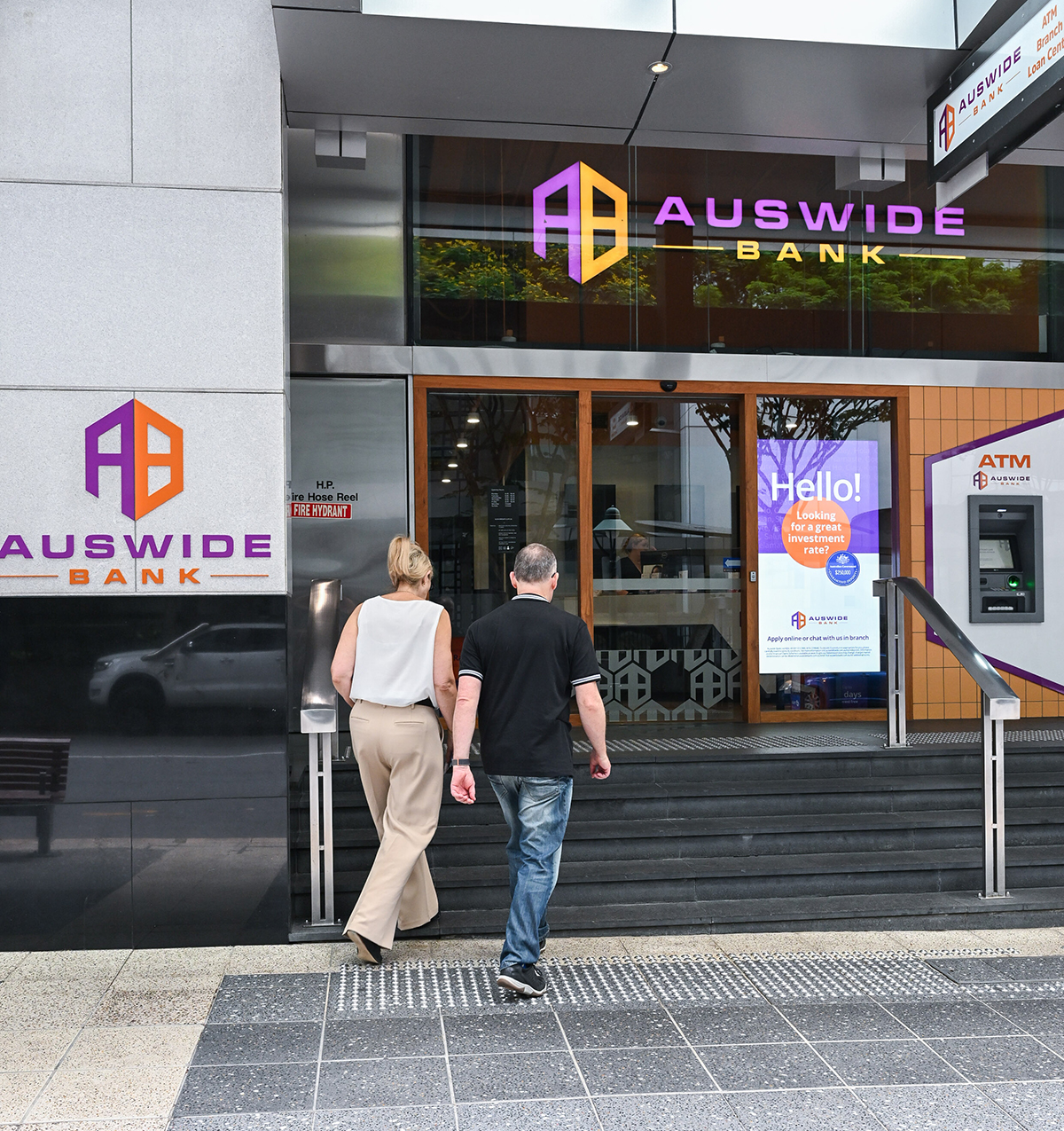
- Auswide Bank Brisbane branch, 2024
- Type: Subsidiary
- Industry: Banking, financial services
- Predecessor: Burnett Permanent Building Society (1966), Wide Bay Capricorn Building Society (1979), Wide Bay Australia (2003)
- Founded: 2015 as Auswide Bank
- Number of locations: 16
- Key people: Sandra Birkensleigh (Chairman); Brett Morgan (Managing Director)
- Parent: MyState
- Website: auswidebank.com.au

Auswide Bank is an Australian owned bank, originally established as a building society in 1966, as an alternative to the big banks. It merged with MyState in 2025.

== Overview ==
Auswide Bank has been around for over 59 years and has 16 branches located primarily across the Queensland east coast.

They provide personal banking products and services including loans, savings and investments, insurance, foreign exchange and banking services, with a focus on home ownership for everyday Australians.

== Corporate history ==
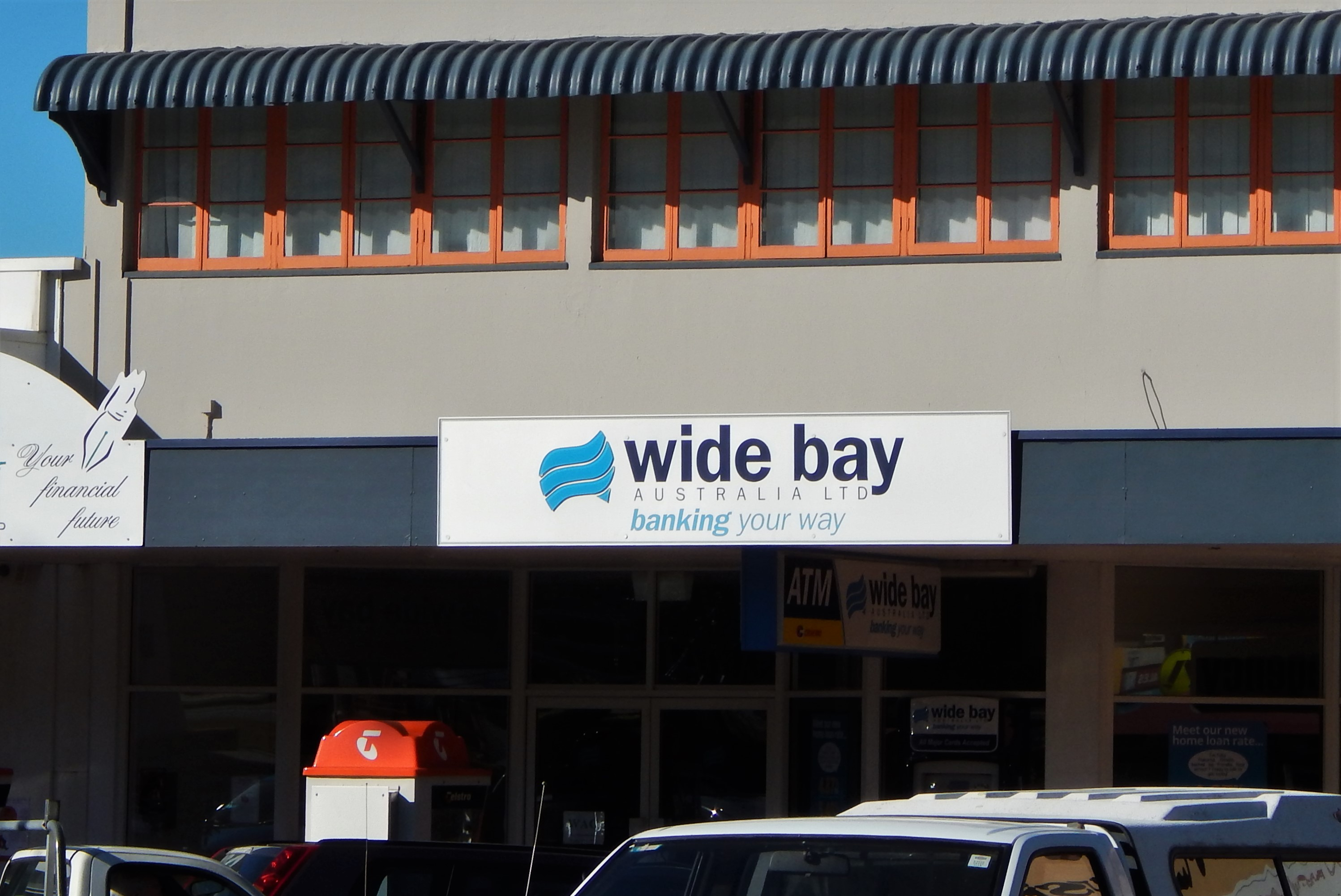
A Wide Bay Australia branch pictured in 2014, prior to rebranding

Auswide Bank’s origins are in regional Queensland local communities from where the Bank has expanded to have a national presence.

Timeline
1979	Wide Bay Capricorn Building Society was formed as the result of a merger between the Burnett Permanent Building Society (based in Bundaberg) and the Maryborough Permanent Building Society, both of which had operated since the 1960s.
1981-1983	Wide Bay Capricorn amalgamated with the Gympie and North Coast Building Society and in 1983 another merger occurred with the Gladstone based Port Curtis Building Society.
1994	Wide Bay Capricorn Building Society as listed on the Australian Securities Exchange.
2000/2001	Wide Bay Capricorn exceeded $1 billion in assets and loans under management.
2003	Wide Bay Capricorn was changed to Wide Bay Australia in December following branch expansion and a strong support base in Central and South-East Queensland.
2008	Mackay Permanent Building Society Limited merged with Wide Bay Australia.
2015	On April 1, Wide Bay Australia officially becomes Auswide Bank. The decision was made by Wide Bay Australia's board of directors to convert to a bank based on several reasons including the geographic limitations of the Wide Bay name and the added 'security' that banks are perceived to offer. On 22 December 2015, Auswide Bank announced a merger with the Brisbane based Queensland Professional Credit Union (trading as Your Credit Union). The merger was completed on May 20th 2016.
2024	in August 2024 it was announced that Auswide Bank and MyState Financial, based in Tasmania were seeking a merger
2025	On 19 February 2025, Auswide Bank merged with MyState.

== Operations ==
Auswide Bank’s corporate office locations are based in Bundaberg and Brisbane in Queensland, Australia.

=== Retail Banking ===
The retail banking channel provides financial services to personal and business banking customers via Auswide Bank branches, mobile lenders, phone and online.

=== Third Party ===
The third-party channel provides loans and associated financial services to customers via accredited mortgage brokers and introducers and deposits to customers via partnerships and deposit brokers.

=== Private Bank ===
The private banking channel offers a range of financial products – from banking and deposits to borrowing and protection.
