= Ak Bars =

Ak Bars may refer to:

- Aq Bars (or Ak Bars), the emblem of Tatarstan.
- Ak Bars Kazan, a Russian professional ice hockey team based in Kazan.
- Ak Bars Holding, a Russian financial concern
  - Ak Bars Bank, its principle holding
