= Raiffeisen Bank International =

Austrian banking group

Raiffeisen Bank International AG

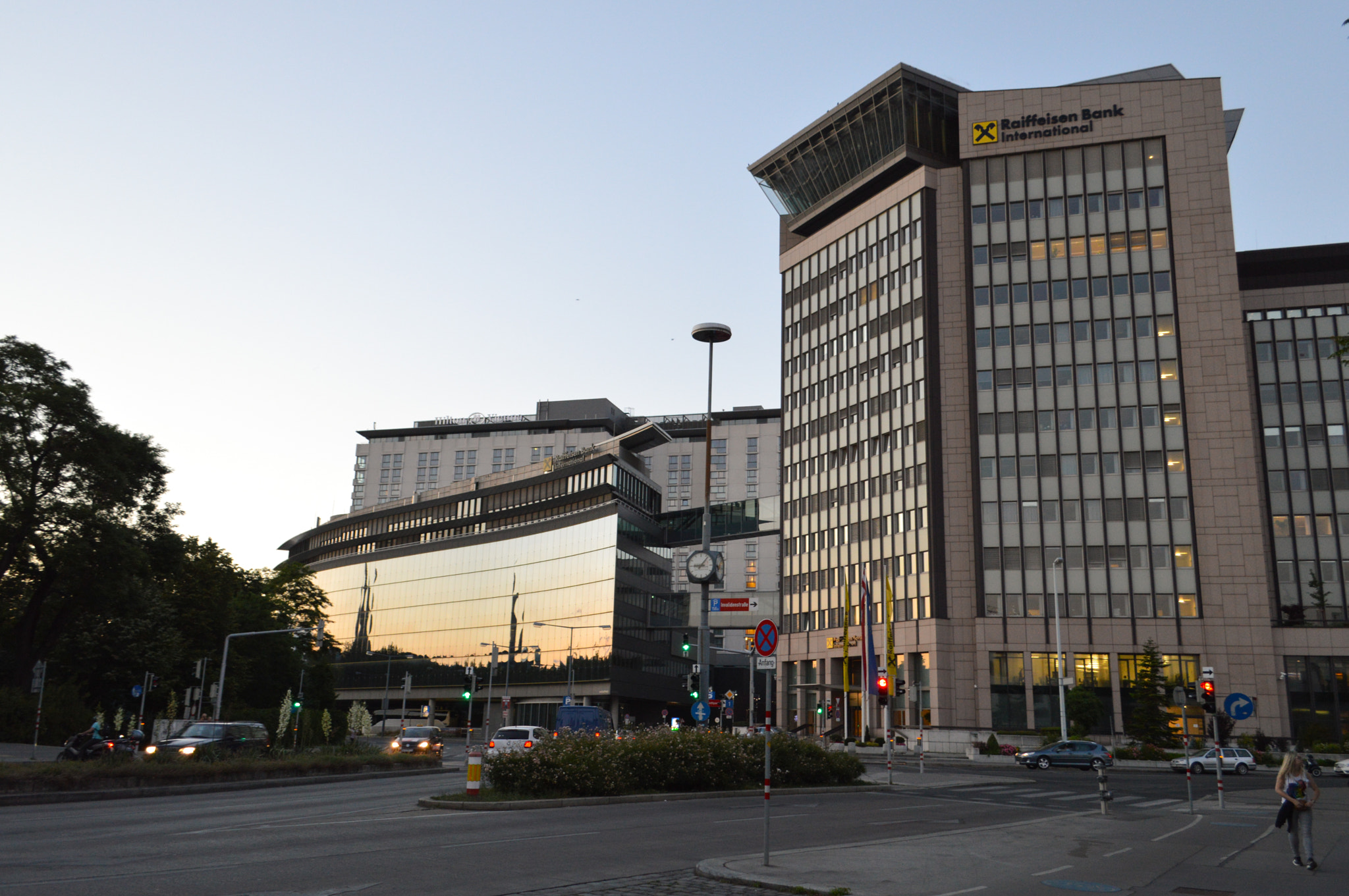
- Type: Aktiengesellschaft
- Traded as: WBAG: RBI
- ISIN: AT0000606306
- Industry: Financial services
- Founded: 2010
- Headquarters: Vienna, Austria
- Area served: Austria; Central Europe; Eastern Europe
- Services: Retail and corporate banking
- Total assets: €218,360 billion (Q1 2026)
- Owner: Regional Raiffeisen; (61.17%); Other shareholders; (38.83%)
- Website: RBInternational.com

Raiffeisen Bank International (RBI) is a key entity of the decentralized Raiffeisen Banking Group in Austria, acting both as the latter's domestic central financial entity and as the holding company for all the group's operations outside of Austria. The bank is listed on the Wiener Börse. Its major shareholders are the Raiffeisen Banking Group's eight regional banks (Raiffeisen-Landesbanken), which are bound by a shareholders' agreement and together hold a majority of RBI's equity.

RBI was established in 2010 as a subsidiary of Raiffeisen Zentralbank (RZB), and absorbed the latter in March 2017 through a reverse takeover. Since then, it has been designated as a Significant Institution under European Banking Supervision, and as a consequence is directly supervised by the European Central Bank.

RBI is a member of Österreichischer Raiffeisenverband (Austrian Raiffeisen Association), which amongst other things functions as the interest representation association for all Austrian Raiffeisen cooperatives.

RBI has a substantial presence in Russia and Belarus. In the lead-up to the 2022 Russian invasion of Ukraine, RBI was by far the single biggest mover of money to Russia. RBI is the largest Western bank still present in Russia; most Western banks left Russia after the invasion.

== History ==
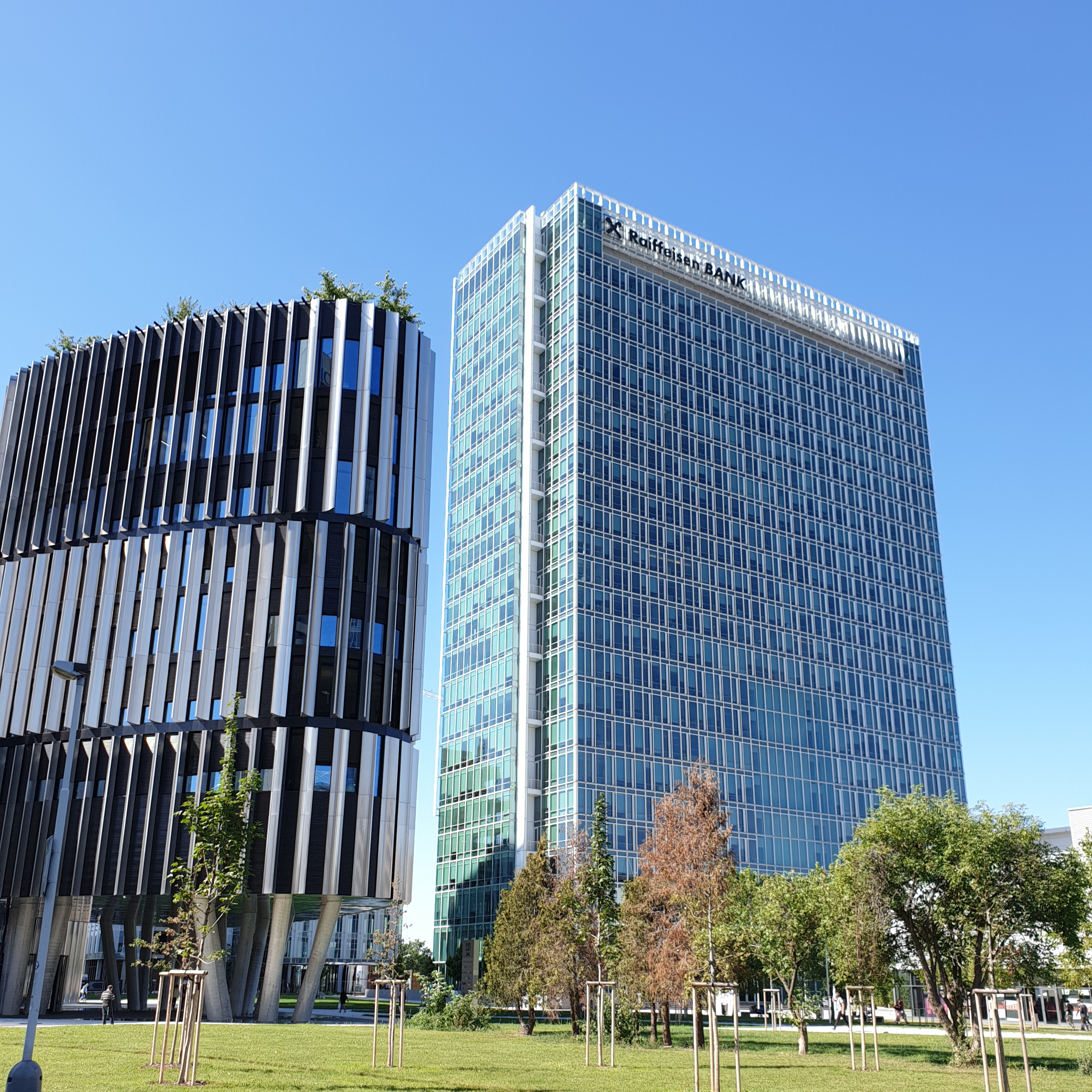
City Tower with Raiffeisen Bank logo in Prague

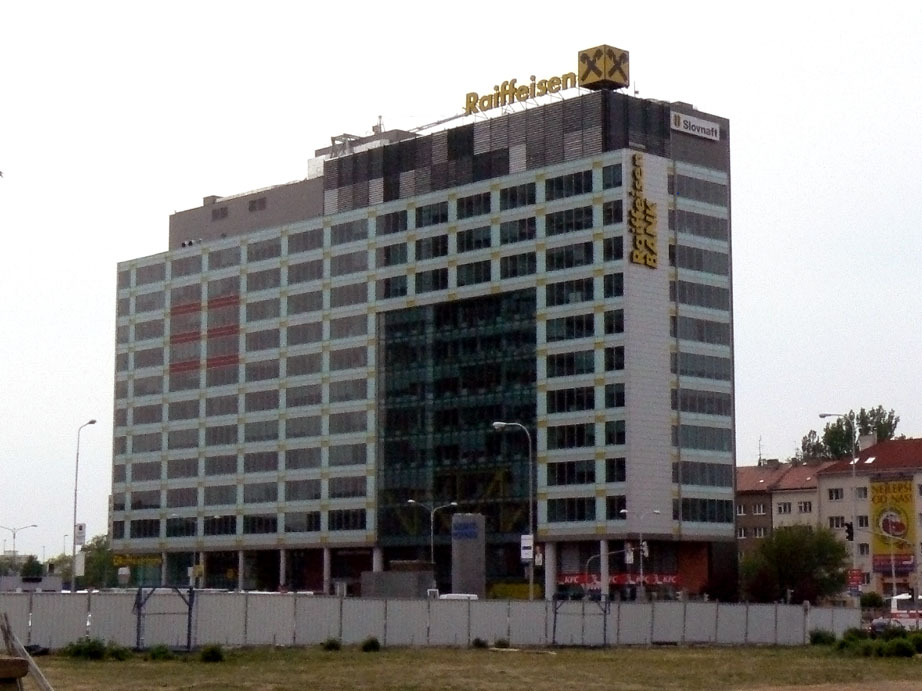
Raiffeisen Bank building in Prague

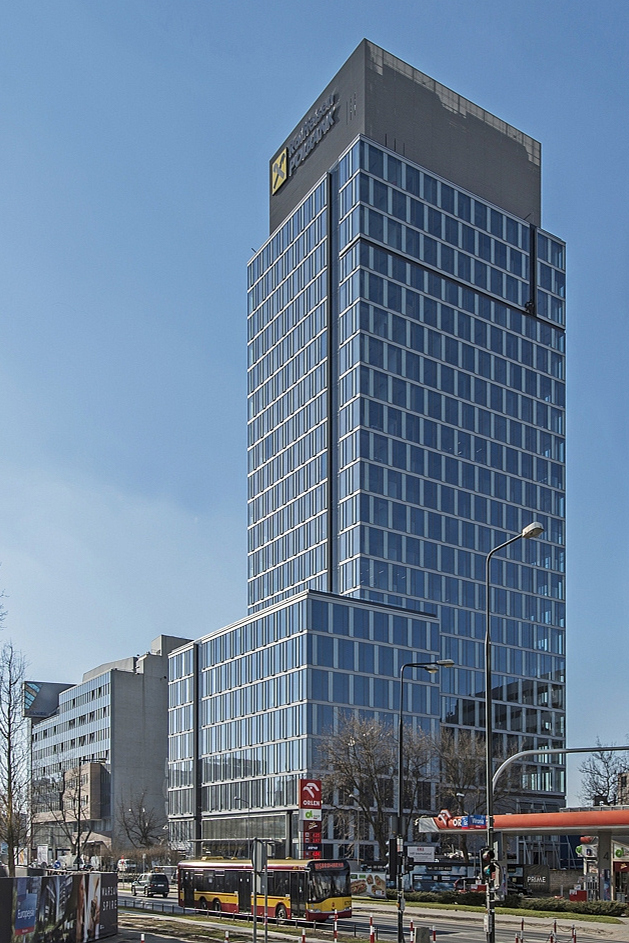
Prime Corporate Center, Raiffeisen Bank building in Warsaw

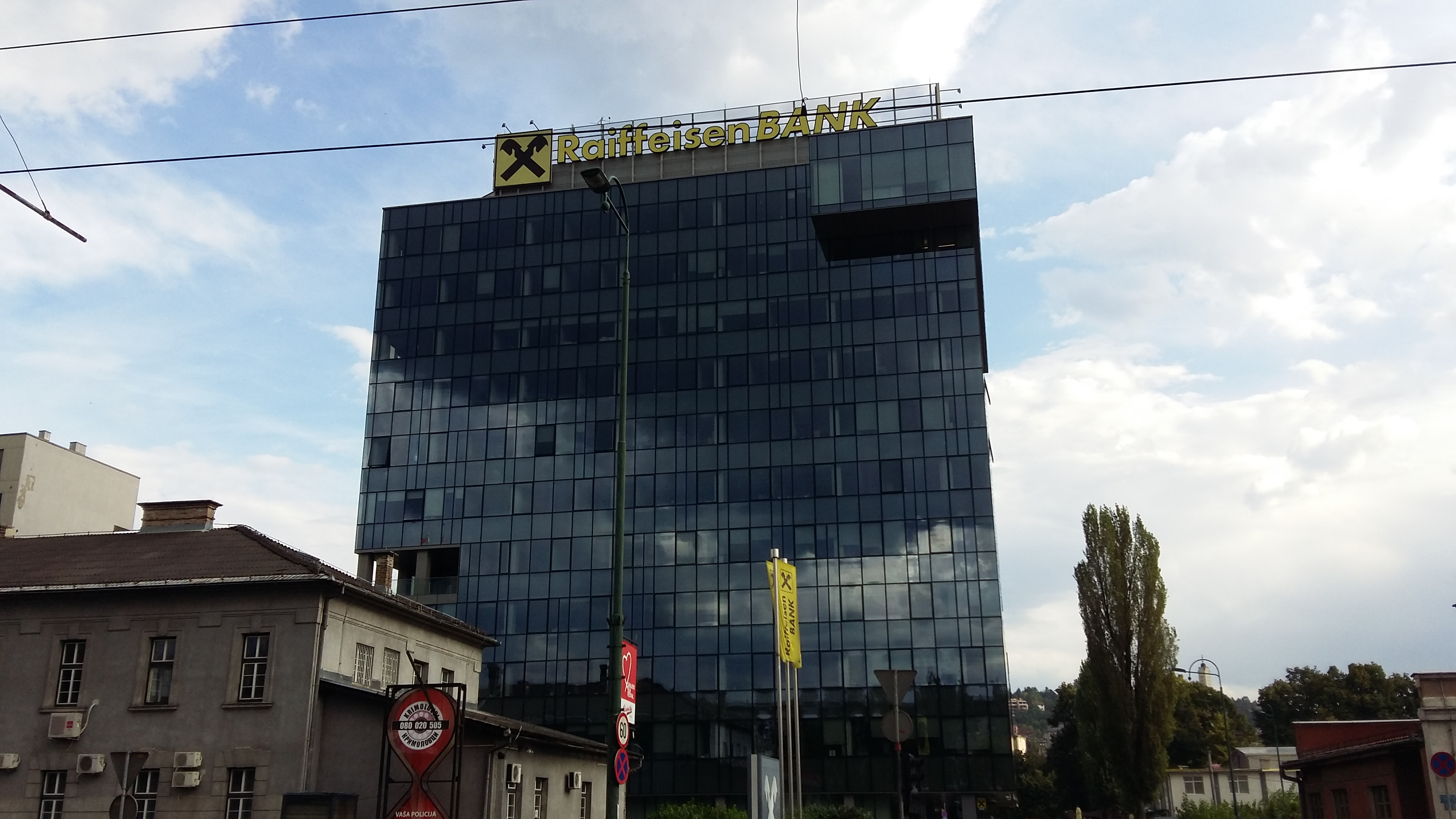
Raiffeisen Bank building in Sarajevo

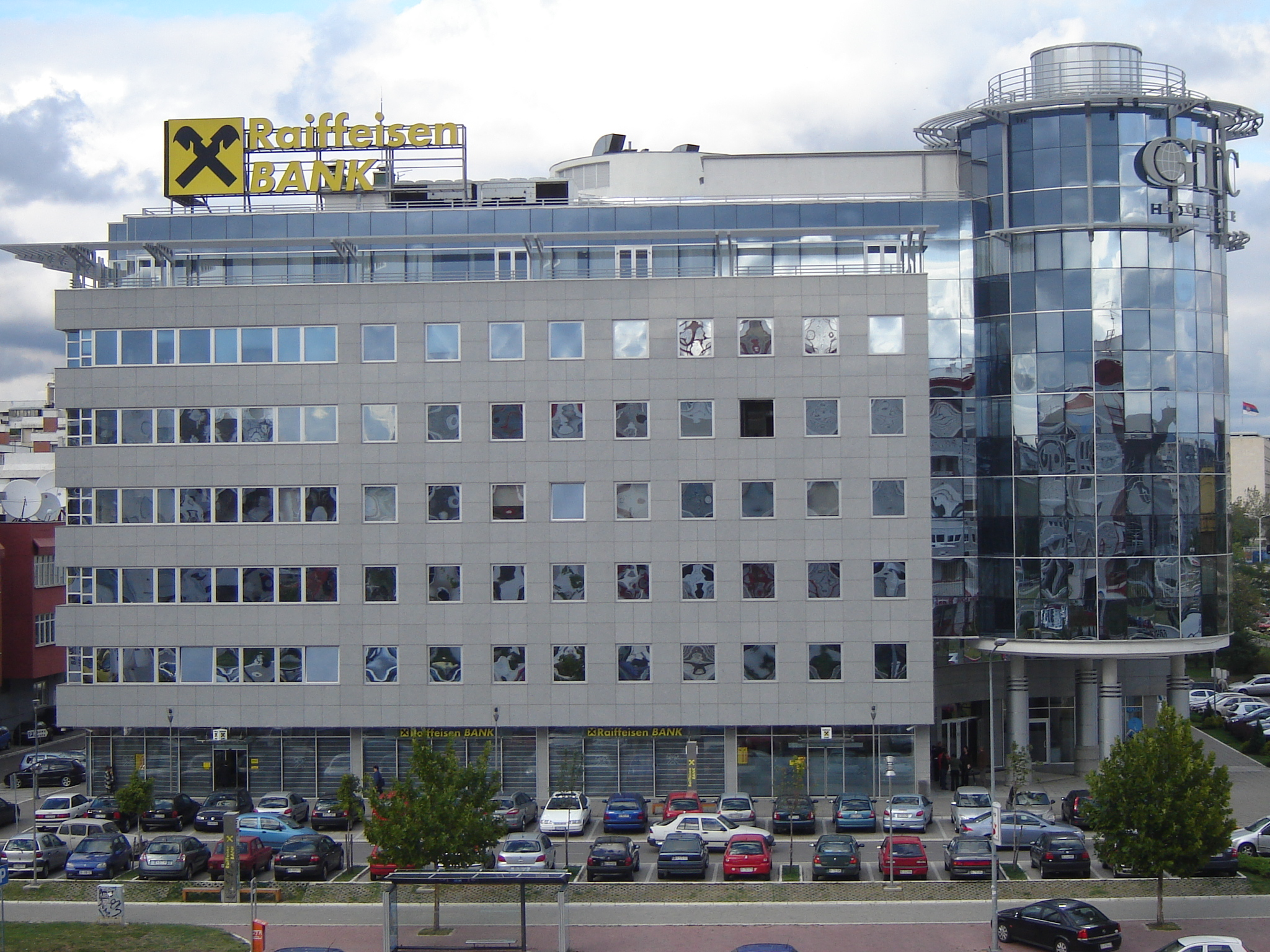
Raiffeisen Bank building in New Belgrade

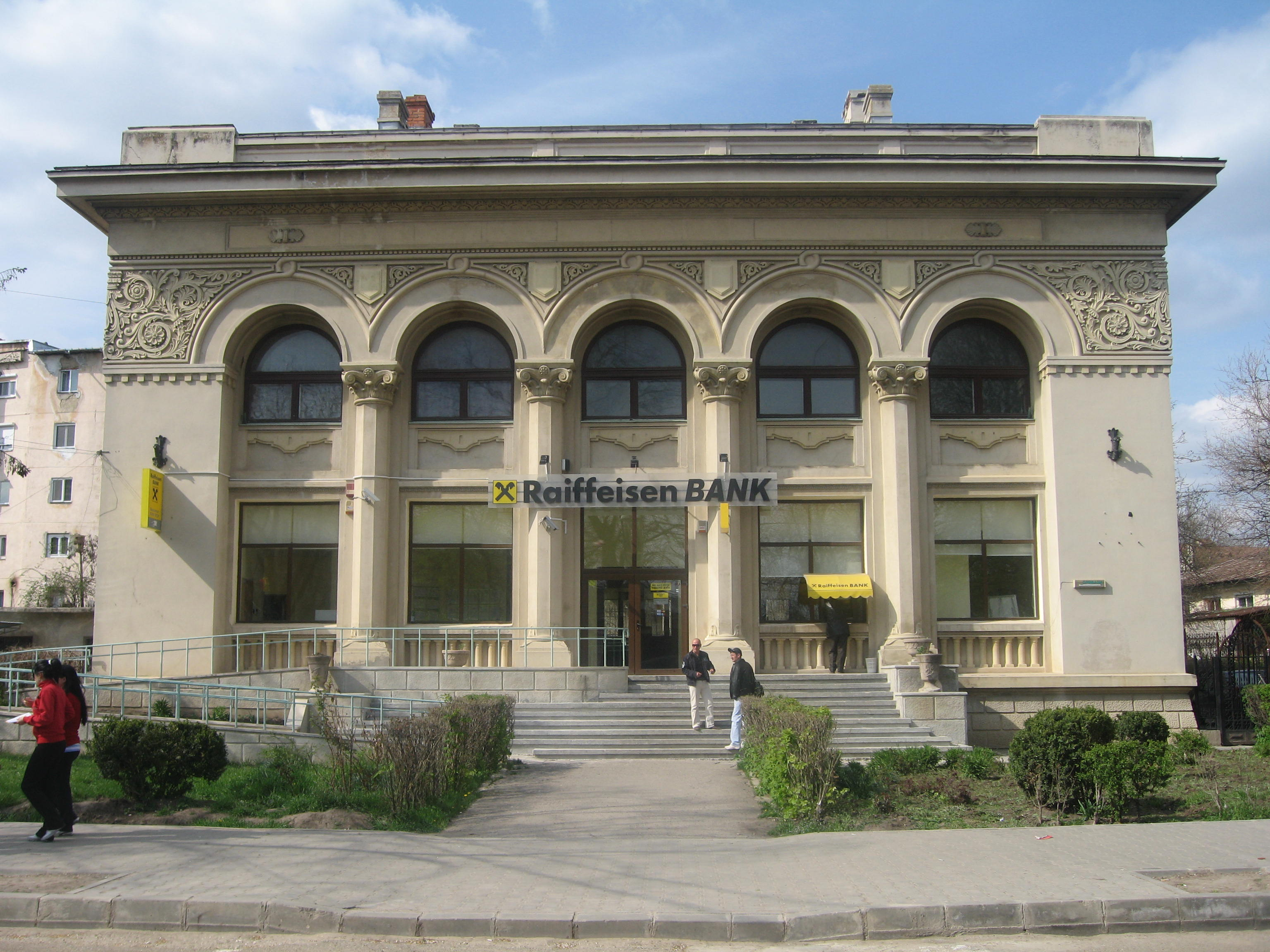
Raiffeisen Bank branch in Huși, Romania

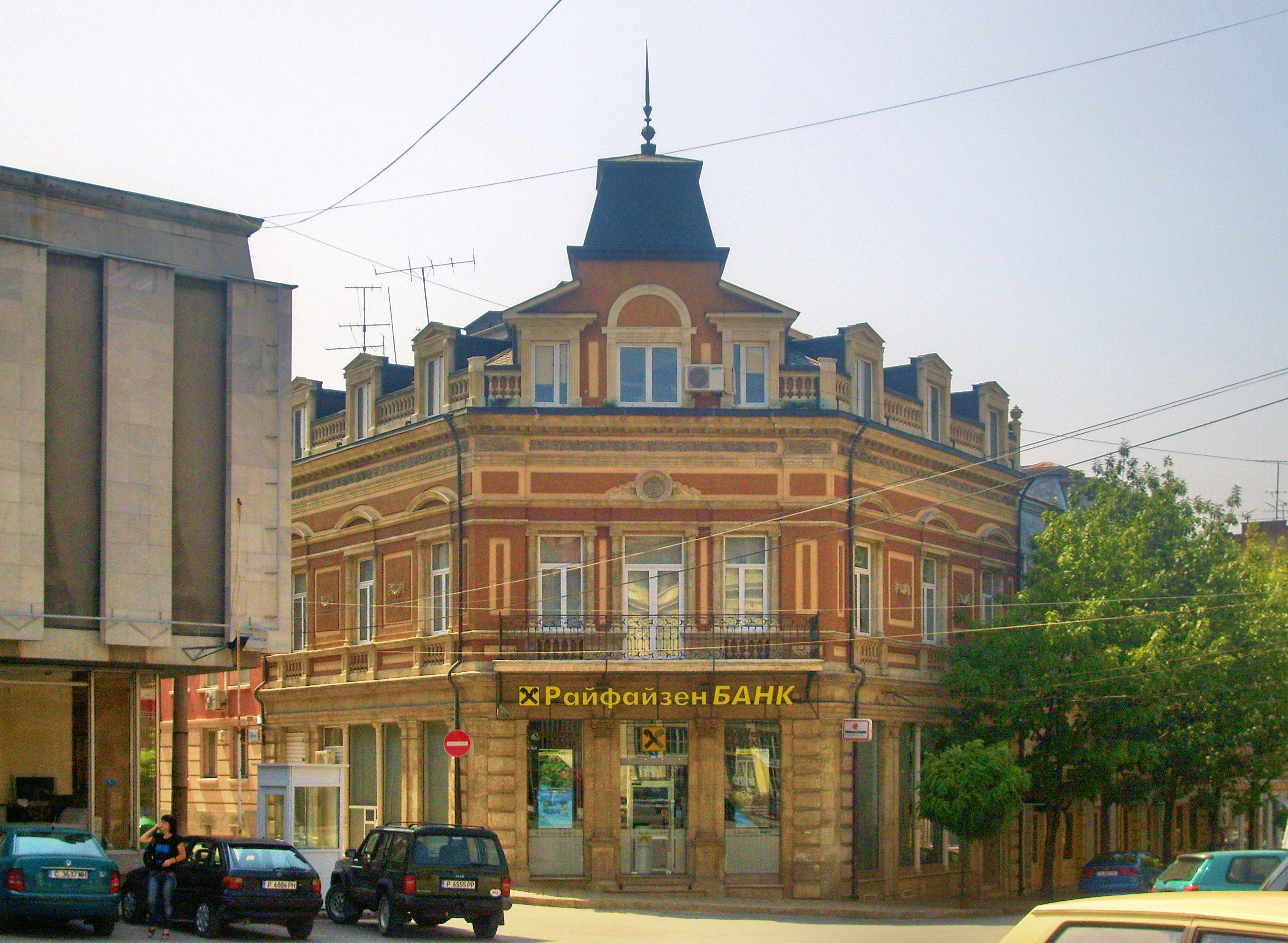
Raiffeisen Bank branch in Ruse, Bulgaria

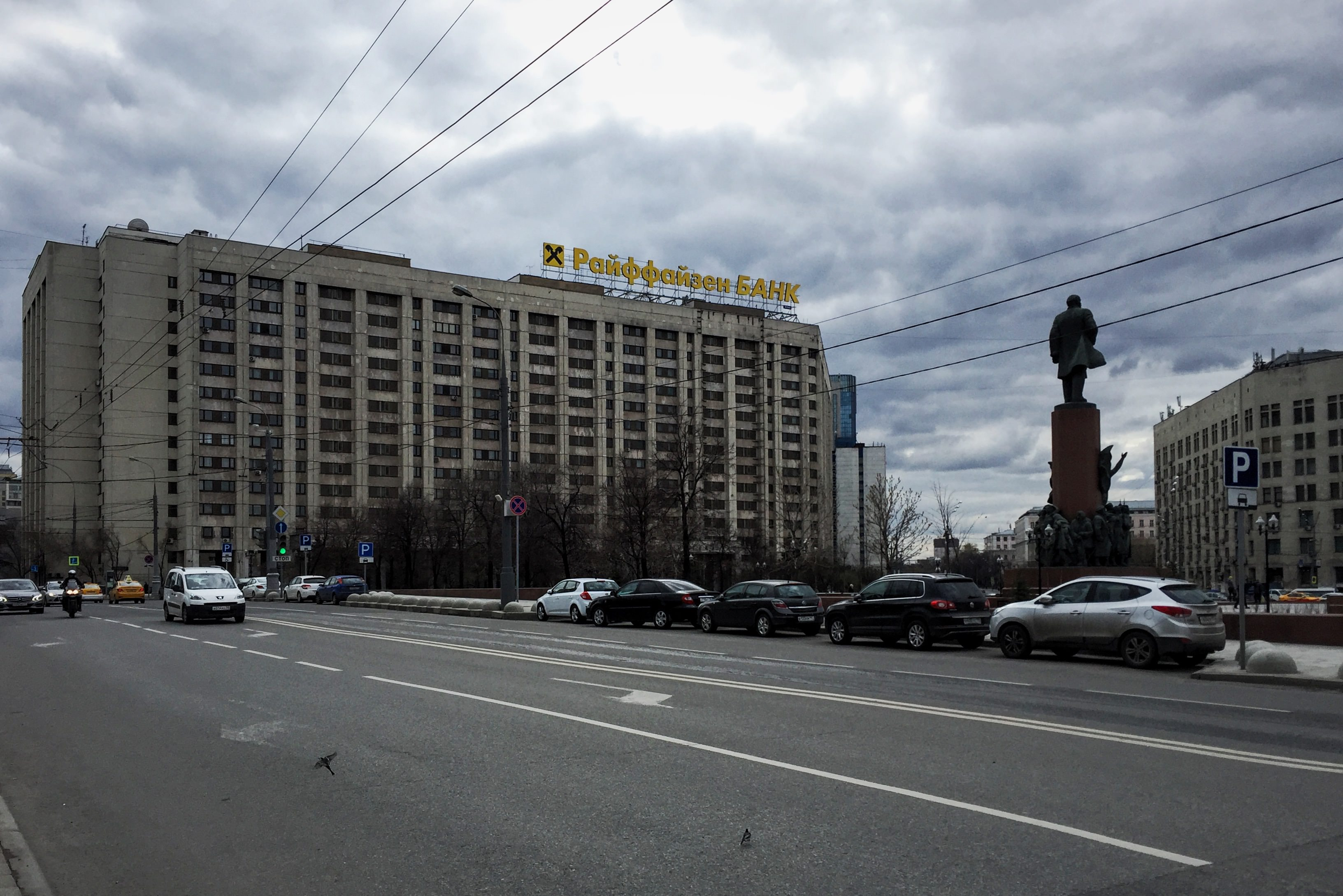
Raiffeisen Bank logo on a building bordering Kaluzhskaya Square in Moscow, 2016

At the end of February 2010, RZB CEO Walter Rothensteiner announced that a possible merger of some operations of RZB with Raiffeisen International Bank-Holding AG (RI), an intermediate holding company created in the early 2000s and listed in 2005. The newly founded Raiffeisen Bank International would incorporate those segments of RZB not directly related to RZB's function as the central institution of the decentralized Raiffeisen Banking Group. On 19 April 2010, the executive boards of the two institutions resolved to present the proposed merger to the shareholders for approval, which was granted at general shareholders' meetings of the RZB on 7 July 2010 and RI on the following day. Raiffeisen Bank International began its activities on 11 October 2010. By the end of 2010, it served over 14 million customers with about 3,000 branch offices.

In 2013, Raiffeisen Bank International opened a branch in Hong Kong. Two years later, its Xiamen branch and Harbin office closed. In 2016, Raiffeisen Banka d.d. of Slovenia (which was renamed KBS Banka and merged with another bank to become Nova Kreditna Banka Maribor) was sold to Apollo Global Management and the European Bank for Reconstruction and Development.

On 18 March 2017, Raiffeisen Bank International merged with Raiffeisen Zentralbank; the merger was approved at a January 2017 extraordinary general meeting of RBI's shareholders. The bank suspended the initial public offering of its subsidiary, Raiffeisen Bank Polska, in mid-2017.

In August 2021, Crédit Agricole S.A. announced the signing of an agreement to sell Crédit Agricole Srbija A.D. to Raiffeisen Bank (Serbia), a fully owned subsidiary of Austrian Raiffeisen Bank International AG. In accordance with the prior consent of the National Bank of Serbia, Raiffeisen banka a.d Beograd has become the sole owner of Credit Agricole banka Srbija a.d. Novi Sad on April 1, 2022, taking over from Credit Agricole s.a. Paris as the former owner. As a result of the transaction, Credit Agricole bankа Srbija has become a member of the Raiffeisen group. The joint share of the two banks in the Serbian market will be around 12%. After the merger with Crédit Agricole bank, the loan portfolio of Raiffeisen banka is expected to reach almost €3 billion and the client base to exceed one million. The merger of Raiffeisen banka a.d. Beograd and Crédit Agricole Srbija A.D. Novi Sad is expected to be completed by the end of the second quarter of 2023.

In November 2021, Belgium-based KBC Bank and Raiffeisen Bank International reached an agreement for KBC to acquire 100% of the shares of Raiffeisenbank (Bulgaria) EAD, comprising RBI’s Bulgarian banking operations. In March 2022, Bulgaria's competition regulator said that it gave the green light to KBC Bank, a unit of financial group KBC, to acquire 100% direct interest in Raiffeisenbank Bulgaria and indirect control of the target company's wholly owned units Raiffeisen Leasing Bulgaria, Raiffeisen Asset Management (Bulgaria), Raiffeisen Insurance Broker, and Raiffeisen Service. The transaction was completed on 7 July 2022 and marked the exit of Raiffeisen from the Bulgarian market.

In April 2026, Raiffeisen Bank International launched a takeover bid for Addiko Bank in order to strengthen its presence in Slovenia and Croatia. By the end of the acceptance period, in July 2026, Raiffeisen Bank International had secured a majority stake of 56.16% in Addiko.

== Subsidiaries ==
- Raiffeisen (Albania) (Albania)
- Raiffeisen Bank BiH (Bosnia and Herzegovina)
- Raiffeisenbank Czechia (Czechia)
- Raiffeisenbank Croatia (Croatia)
- Raiffeisen Bank Hungary (Hungary)
- Raiffeisen Bank Kosovo (Kosovo)
- Raiffeisen Bank (Romania) (Romania)
- Raiffeisenbank (Russia) (Russia)
- Raiffeisen Bank Serbia (Serbia)
- Raiffeisenbank Slovakia & Tatra Banka (Slovakia)
- Raiffeisen Bank (Ukraine) (Ukraine)

== Controversy ==
=== Belarus ===
In June 2020, Raiffeisen Bank International arranged Belarusian government bonds worth over €1.4 billion. By then, opposition Belarusian presidential candidates, demonstrators, and journalists had been arrested by the regime of Alexander Lukashenko amid mass protests. Pavel Latushko of the opposition Coordination Council accused RBI of supporting the dictatorship of Lukashenko, calling on RBI subsidiary Priorbank to end its business relationships with Belarusian state banks and to sell the government bonds. RBI rejected Latushko's charge that the bank economically supported human-rights violations in Belarus.

=== Raiffeisen and the Russian invasion of Ukraine ===
In January 2023, U.S. Treasury Department's Office of Foreign Assets Control became interested in Raiffeisen's Russian business. Raiffeisen is one of the few large international banks that did not wind down its business after Russia's invasion of Ukraine. The Russian division of Raiffeisen has the status of a systemically important bank, ranks second in terms of net profit and provides half of the group's net profit (4,2 billion Euros). OFAC sent a request to the bank to "clarify" the bank's business activity in Russia in the light of recent events. Raiffeisen promised to answer questions in several stages during April–June 2023.

In March 2023, Raiffeisen was named an international sponsor of war by Ukraine's National Agency on Corruption Prevention. In December 2023, Ukraine excluded Raiffeisen Bank from the list of war sponsors for the 12th package of EU sanctions against Russia.

As of October 2023, Raiffeisen Bank has not left the Russian market. Under pressure from the Ukrainian government and its allied countries, the Raiffeisen Bank International (RBI) has changed its rhetoric. The RBI Group will continue to progress potential transactions which would result in the sale or spin-off of Raiffeisenbank Russia and deconsolidation of Raiffeisenbank Russia from the RBI Group, in full compliance with local and international laws and regulation and in consultation with the relevant competent authorities. RBI also states, that in case of a sale or a spin-off, the CET1-Ratio of RBI Group would stay robust.

Western banks are struggling to leave Russia. According to the Financial Times, banks such as JSC Raiffeisenbank, JSC UniCredit Bank, JSC Commercial Bank Citibank, and others are still operating in Russia. The majority of banks stopped further investments in their Russian subsidiaries. However, it is worth noting that Société Générale was able to leave Russia and sell its assets to Rosbank. That resulted in an estimated loss for the bank of 3.3 billion euros.

On the 7th of April, according to a publication in the Russian media, the Russian branch of RBI stopped issuing new cards with the package “salary”. The official bank comment was that this decision was based on “the market analysis”. However, this could also be a result of the change in rhetoric and statement about reduction of services made earlier.

The next day, the National Bank of Ukraine released a statement commenting on the RBI press release. The NBU pointed out that they see a positive shift in the rhetoric, however, they also acknowledge the lack of a specific plan that will further reduce RBI operations and presence in Russia and lead to the spin-off. On the other hand, the NBU pointed out the systematic contribution of RBI’s subsidiary in Ukraine - Raiffeisen Bank Aval JSC, to the country's financial stability during the raging war.

According to Reuters, one of the senior Raiffeisen executives said that they are negotiating a selling deal for the Russian branch with two potential buyers. However, the spin-off itself could take up to seven months.

Austria had wanted Raiffeisen Bank International removed from the Ukraine blacklist in return for signing off on the latest EU sanctions package against Russia. The bank was "suspended" from the list but Ukraine refused to remove it completely unless it hears more "positive news".

Austrian officials say Raiffeisen has been treated unfairly when other banks, such as Italy's UniCredit, remains active in Russia but does not appear on the list of sponsors of war.

On 7 March 2024, the US Treasury Department stated it was to meet Raiffeisen to warn they "risk being cut off from the U.S. financial system".

In March 2025, the Organized Crime and Corruption Reporting Project and Der Standard reported Raiffeisen had sent about $10 billion worth of euros and US dollars, in cash, to Russia in the weeks leading to the 2022 invasion, including several shipments arriving after the invasion had begun.

In December 2025, it was reported that the Austrian government proposed to unfreeze the assets of a sanctioned Russian company Rasperia, to help Raiffeisen offset their $2.1 billion write off.

== See also ==
- Banque Raiffeisen in Luxembourg
- Crédit Agricole
- ICCREA Banca
- Rabobank
- List of banks in Austria
- List of banks in the euro area
