= Sergei Vladimirovich Kovbasyuk =

- Born: 30 April 1975 (age 51); Samara
- Occupations: Attorney, lawyer

Sergei V. Kovbasyuk (born 30 April 1975, Samara) is a Russian attorney, founder and manager of the Attorneys and Business law firm, member of the Moscow City Chamber of Attorneys and the Public Council under the Ministry of Internal Affairs of the Russian Federation.

Sergei V. Kovbasyuk became head of the Moscow-based Attorneys and Business law firm in 2005 and a member of the Public Council under the Russian Ministry of Internal Affairs in October 2011.

== Background ==
Sergei V. Kovbasyuk graduated from the Military University of the Ministry of Defense in 1997 and went to work as an investigator for the Office of Investigations of the Russian Federal Security Service.

He became Deputy General Director of the Executive Board of the Ministry of Culture of the Russian Federation in 2001, and since that year he has been an attorney at the Moscow Attorney Association "Attorneys' Partnership".

In 2005, Sergei V. Kovbasyuk became the manager of the Attorneys and Business law firm.

He joined the Public Council under the Russian Ministry of Internal Affairs in 2011.

== Activities as an attorney ==
Attorneys and Business: Founded in 1994 as a law firm, the company gained the status of a lawyer's office in 2003 and focused on corporate affairs regulation and full legal support (bankruptcy and arbitrage)

The name Kovbasyuk became known in early 2000s thanks to the case of the ex-head of the Russian State Arms Export Company (Rosvooruzheniye) Alexander Kotelkin who was at law with media outlets, which published a file of the Most Group security service about the Ukrainian mafia leaders from among the top-ranking Russian managers including Kotelkin. The media outlets claimed that because of Kotelkin and other businessmen, Ukraine became a leader in illegal arms trade.

The attorney's second headline-making case was in 2014 and caused an international outcry . The Quinn Group owned by an Irish billionaire Sean Quinn went bankrupt in 2011. In the mid-2000s, the businessman invested heavily in real estate development in Russia. Because of the Quinn Group's debts, the government of Ireland had to rescue the Anglo Irish Bank and nationalized all the group's assets used as collateral for loans. The Quinn Group's Russian assets were estimated at 0.5 billion US dollars.

In 2015, Sergei V. Kovbasyuk defended IKEA in the class action lawsuit over the food poisoning at the store's restaurant famous for its meatballs. Other sources say the lawyer's office has been defending IKEA in multiple lawsuits for several years.

The most famous clients: RusHydro, IKEA MOS, UniCredit Bank, the Moscow Region Office of the Federal Agency for State Property Management, and Bank ZENIT.

== Awards and achievements ==
The certificate of merit "For high professionalism and commitment to the attorney’s duty" given by the Presidium of the Moscow City Chamber of Attorneys (2009) According to the Pravo.ru portal, Attorneys and Business ranked among top 20 Russian companies for revenue in 2016.

== Business ==
An investor in SVK Agro, Sergei V. Kovbasyuk decided to set up a rabbit farm in one of the Russian regions. In June 2017, SVK Agro is going to launch a rabbit meat production facility worth 1.2 billion rubles. The target production output is expected to reach 600 metric tons per year. According to Sergei V. Kovbasyuk, the Bryansk Region administration gave the SBK Agro peasant farm enterprise 32 ha of land for construction of the facility. Kovbasyuk expects to occupy up to 30% of the domestic rabbit meat market and become the largest rabbit meat producer in Russia.

== Public work ==
Living in Pavlovo-2, a luxury single home housing development near Moscow, he is a member of a group of activists and the Pavlovo Home Owners Association, which campaigns against the OPIN development group. Home and landowners of Pavlovo-2 intend to file a lawsuit against the Story Group development company to charge 1.263,166,579 billion rubles as compensation for actions which pushed down the purchase prices for houses and violated environmental laws.

== Private life ==
Married, has three children.
