= Auto Finance Bank =

Russian bank

JSC Auto Finance Bank
- Native name: АО Авто Финанс Банк
- Formerly: JSC RN Bank
- Company type: Subsidiary
- Predecessor: CJSC Bank Siberia
- Founded: 5 September 2013
- Headquarters: Moscow, Russia
- Key people: Olga Bodnarchuk (chairman of the board)
- Services: Banking
- Revenue: ▼ ₽11,527.03 million (2020)
- Operating income: ▲ ₽4,430.22 million (2020)
- Net income: ▲ ₽3,504.73 million (2020)
- Total assets: ▼ ₽106,255.87 million (2020)
- Total equity: ▲ ₽22,916.77 million (2020)
- Parent: AvtoVAZ
- Website: autofinancebank.ru/

Auto Finance Bank (Russian: Авто Финанс Банк), named until July 2023 RN Bank (Russian: РН Банк), is a Moscow-based bank established in 2013, owned by the Russian car manufacturer AvtoVAZ and aimed at financing its car sales.

The first financial affiliate of AvtoVAZ, AvtoVAZbank (Russian: АвтоВАЗбанк), operated as such from 1988 to 1996. In 1997, AvtoVAZ replaced it with Automotive Banking House, later renamed Lada-Credit (Russian: Лада-Кредит). From the late 2000s onwards, AvtoVAZ partnerered with other banking companies for financing. RCI Banque entered into the Russian market in 2006, financing Renault and Nissan sales. RN Bank was established in 2013 as a joint venture owned by UniCredit Bank Russia (as majority holder), RCI Banque and Nissan to finance Renault, Nissan and AvtoVAZ sales. It was acquired by AvtoVAZ in 2023 and later renamed.

== History ==
=== AvtoVAZbank ===
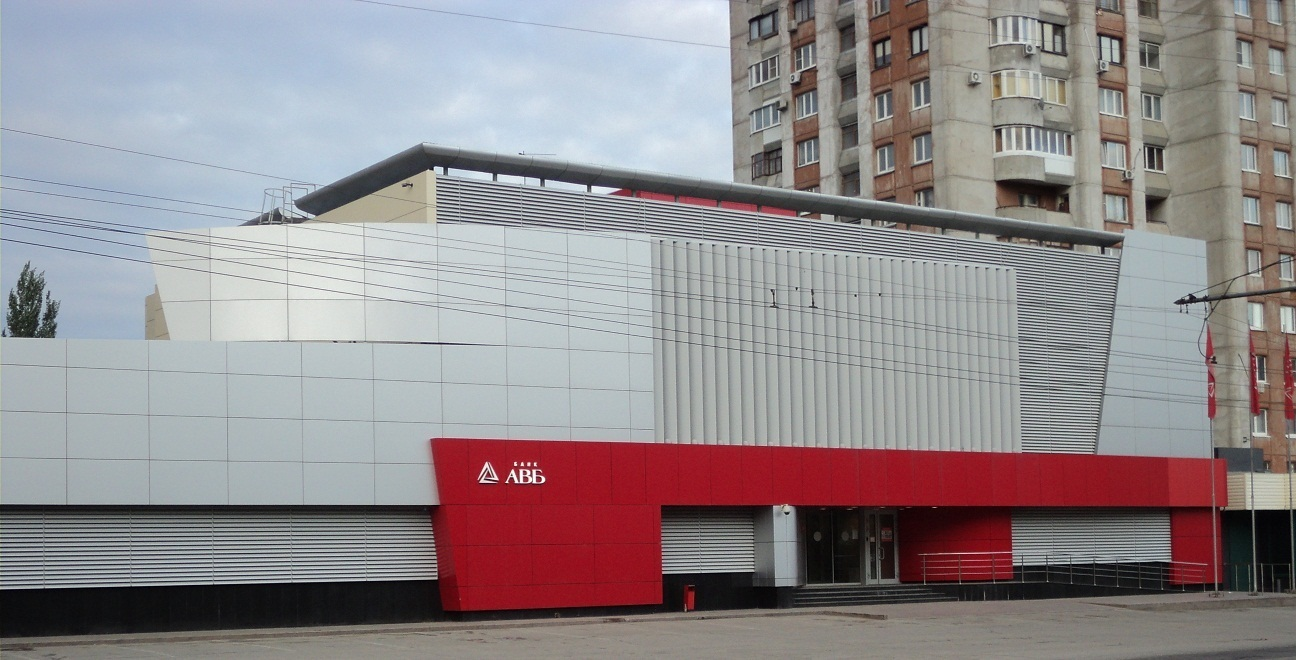
Bank AVB headquarters, pictured in 2012

Tolyatti-based AvtoVAZbank was established in 1988 as the financial affiliate of AvtoVAZ as well as one of the first commercial banks in Russia. Its founders were AvtoVAZ along with Vnesheconombank, Sberbank and Promstroybank (Russia). By 1995, the largest shareholders of the bank were AvtoVAZ (over 30%), KamAZ (16.4%) and LogoVAZ, a car distributor (18.6%). In the Volga region, it controlled a quarter of the financial capital and more than a third of the banking capital. It had investments in financial companies, oil companies, publishing companies, among others. The bank had a management school, the International Academy of Business and Banking, something unique at the time in Russia.

In late 1995, following a crisis in the loan market that severely affected it, AvtoVAZbank almost stopped trading and started a restructuring, while the Central Bank of Russia appointed an interim management in February 1996. AvtoVAZ transferred its management school to the Tolyatti municipality and sold various assets. In mid-1996, AvtoVAZbank resumed transactions with AvtoVAZ at a small scale. By that time, AvtoVAZ dropped AvtoVAZbank as its main financial affiliate. In 1999, the state-controlled Agency for the Restructuring of Credit Organisations (ARCO) became the main AvtoVAZbank shareholder. In May 2001, Globex, a Moscow-based banking holding, bought out the ARCO stake. In July 2005, the AvtoVAZbank shares owned by Globex (over 90% of the company's total) came under the control of five companies owned by top managers of AvtoVAZbank. In April 2007, AvtoVAZbank decided to remove "AvtoVAZ" from its name, as it no longer had a relationship with the car manufacturer. In August 2008, AvtoVAZbank adopted the trading name Bank AVB. In July 2015, as its financial situation continued deteriorating, the bank was taken by the government and transferred to Promsvyazbank for restructuring. In May 2018, Bank AVB was acquired by the Central Bank of Russia.

In 2019, Bank AVB was liquidated, and its assets were absorbed by the Trust Bank.

=== Lada-Credit, Novikombank and others ===
In early 1996, as AvtoVAZbank was not able to properly operate in the market, AvtoVAZ partnered with Tolyatti-based Rosestbank as its main financial backer. In late 1996, the two companies decided to create a new main financial affiliate for AvtoVAZ by using an existing dormant small bank, Moscow-based Volna, which had been established in 1994. In 1996, Volna was re-registered in Tolyatti. In 1997, it was bought out by AvtoVAZ and changed its name to CB Automotive Banking House LLC. It was renamed CJSC CB Lada-Credit in June 2009.

In June 2006, AvtoVAZ and Vneshtorgbank signed a strategic partnership agreement for the latter to manage AvtoVAZ financial flows and give it credit. In April 2008, AvtoVAZ started a similar partnership with Sberbank by which the latter promised to finance investments of AvtoVAZ, its subsidiaries and affiliates.

By 2006, AvtoVAZ started working with Novikombank. In February 2009, AvtoVAZ acquired a 20% stake in Novikombank, and Lada-Credit became a Novikombank subsidiary in 2010. In August 2011, AvtoVAZ sold its stake to Rostec. Lada-Credit continued existing until it lost its banking licence in October 2015.

=== RN Bank and Auto Finance Bank ===
The Renault-owned financial company RCI Banque started activities in Russia in early 2006, launching a loan programme for Nissan cars together with the International Moscow Bank (the present UniCredit Bank Russia) and Nissan's Russian subsidiary. RCI Banque, UniCredit Russia and Avtoframos also launched a program to finance Renault sales. RCI Banque established a Russian subsidiary, RN Finance Rus, in partnership with UniCredit Russia, launching the loan lines Renault Credit, Nissan Finance and Infiniti Finance.

CJSC Bank Siberia (Sibir), an Omsk-based bank, was established in 1989. In 2005, it became a wholly owned subsidiary of ATFBank, a Kazakhstani bank. In September 2011, it was acquired by UniCredit Russia. By 2012, plans for turning Sibir into the financial affiliate for Renault and Nissan in Russia were being discussed. In May 2013, Sibir changed its registered address to Moscow. On 5 September 2013, Sibir was re-registered as RN Bank. RN Bank ownership was transferred to the Dutch-registered holding Barn BV whose ownership was in turn split up into two entities: 40% UniCredit and 60% RN SF Holding BV (a holding equally owned by RCI Banque and Nissan). In March 2018, UniCredit transferred its stake to its subsidiary, UniCredit Russia. In November 2022, plans for AvtoVAZ acquiring all the Barn BV stake were announced, as UniCredit was reducing its Russian activities and considering to leave the Russian market completely. In June 2023, AvtoVAZ acquired all RN Bank shares. In July of that year, the company was renamed as Auto Finance Bank. The renaming process was completed in September.

== Operations ==
Auto Finance Bank provides auto loans for the purchase of AvtoVAZ cars in Russia and financing for its dealerships, as well as related financial services. As of 2021, one-third of the Alliance car sales in Russia were being financed by RN Bank.
