= List of banks in Russia =

This is a list of banks in Russia.

== Banks ==
There are 396 operating banks in Russia (263 banks with a universal license, 133 - from the base). (March 1, 2020)

Reg. No	Bank name	Status	Website
3538	131 BANK	Active	Official Website
2306	ABSOLYuT BANK	Active	Official Website
2879	AVANGARD	Active	Official Website
23	AVTOVAZBANK	Active	Official Website
1455	AVTOGRADBANK	Active	Official Website
1973	AVTOKREDITBANK	Active	Official Website
2860	AGROROS	Active	Official Website
119	AGROHIMBANK	Active	Official Website
3303	AZIYa-INVEST BANK	Active	Official Website
2590	AK BARS	Active	Official Website
2587	AKIBANK	Active	Official Website
3027	AKROPOL'	Active	Official Website
680	AKSONBANK	Active	Official Website
2529	AKTIV BANK	Active	Official Website
927	AKTsIYa	Active	Official Website
53	ALEKSANDROVSKII	Active	Official Website
2119	ALEF-BANK	Active	Official Website
2602	ALMAZERGIENBANK	Active	Official Website
2388	ALTAIBIZNES-BANK	Active	Official Website
2659	ALTAIKAPITALBANK	Active	Official Website
1326	Alfa-Bank	Active	Official Website
991	AL'FA-BANK-BAShKORTOSTAN	Active	Official Website
1810	ATB	Active	Official Website
570	ANDZhIBANK	Active	Official Website
2618	APR-BANK	Active	Official Website
2914	ARESBANK	Active	Official Website
1281	ARZAMAS	Active	Official Website
608	ASPEKT	Active	Official Website
732	ASSOTsIATsIYa	Active	Official Website
2632	BAIKALBANK	Active	Official Website
1067	BAIKALROSBANK	Active	Official Website
444	BALAKOVO-BANK	Active	Official Website
128	BALTIISKII BANK	Active	Official Website
3176	BALTINVESTBANK	Active	Official Website
3138	BANK ZhILISchNOGO FINANSIROVANIYa	Active	Official Website
3255	BANK ZENIT	Active	Official Website
2309	BANK KITAYa (ELOS)	Active	Official Website
2748	Bank of Moscow	Active	Official Website
3390	BANK NATEKSIS	Active	Official Website
3269	BANK ORENBURG	Active	Official Website
1398	BAShKOMSNABBANK	Active	Official Website
1006	Gazprombank	Active	Official Website
3138	BGF	Active	Official Website
760	BELGORODSOTsBANK	Active	Official Website
3068	BFG-KREDIT	Active	Official Website
1436	BI-SI-DI-BANK	Active	Official Website
2684	BKF	Active	Official Website
3407	BNP PARIBAS	Active	Official Website
1277	BOGORODSKII	Active	Official Website
85	BOL'ShOI KAMEN' BANK	Active	Official Website
1677	BPF	Active	Official Website
1144	BRATSKII ANKB	Active	Official Website
1137	BUM-BANK	Active	Official Website
1948	DALENA	Active	Official Website
843	DAL'NEVOSTOChNYI BANK	Active	Official Website
2312	DOM.RF	Active	Official Website
2738	DERZhAVA	Active	Official Website
3328	DOIChE BANK	Active	Official Website
1885	FORA-BANK	Active	Official Website
2316	GAZBANK	license revoked	Official Website
3223	GAZNEFT'BANK	Active	Official Website
354	Gazprombank	Active	Official Website
3252	GAZENERGOBANK	Active	Official Website
2499	KRONA-BANK	Active	Official Website
2209	OTKRITIE	Active	Official Website
3292	Raiffeisenbank (Russia)	Active	Official Website
3349	ROSSEL'HOZBANK	Active	Official Website
328	ROSSIYa	Active	Official Website
329	ROSSIYa	Active	Official apps
1481	SBERBANK ROSSII	Active	Official Website
3368	SMP BANK	Active	Official Website
1	UniCredit Bank	Active	Official Website
2299	VEK	Active	Official Website
524	VENETs	Active	Official Website
1084	VERHNEVOLZhSKII	Active	Official Website
2	VIKING	Active	Official Website
1027	VKABANK	Active	Official Website
903	VLADBIZNESBANK	Active	Official Website
870	VLADIMIRSKII PROMYShLENNYI BANK	Active	Official Website
1000	VTB Bank	Active	Official Website
1439	VOZROZhDENIE	Active	Official Website
312	VOKBANK	Active	Official Website
1896	VOLOGZhANIN	Active	Official Website
3287	VSEROSSIISKII BANK RAZVITIYa REGIONOV	Active	Official Website
1557	VUZ-BANK	Active	Official Website
2796	VYaTICh	Active	Official Website
902	NORVIK BANK	Active	Official Website
2862	DAGBIZNESBANK		
543	DAGESTAN		
347	DAGESTANNOVATsIYa		
3330	DenizBank (see: Sberbank)		
857	DOLINSK		
3209	DOM-BANK		
3120	DONAKTIVBANK		
1617	DONINVEST		
492	DONKOMBANK		
2984	DONSKOI INVESTITsIONNYI BANK		
2126	DONSKOI NARODNYI BANK		
1818	DON-TEKSBANK		
2285	DONHLEBBANK		
269	DOROZhNIK		
1214	DRAGOTsENNOSTI URALA		
1765	EATP BANK		
2765	EKONATsBANK		
1319	EKONOMBANK		
2998	EKSPOBANK		
3085	EKSPRESS-VOLGA		
3237	EKSPRESS-TULA		
3052	EKSTROBANK		
488	ELEKTRONIKA		
1399	ELITA		
3006	ELKABANK		
1950	ELLIPS BANK		
538	ENGEL'SBANK		
67	ENERGOBANK	Active	Official Website
1307	ENERGOTRANSBANK		
1988	ENO		
1991	ESIDBANK		
2317	ETALONBANK		
2839	EVRAZIYa-TsENTR		
1781	EVROAL'YaNS		
1616	EVROPEISKII		
3148	EVROPEISKII RASChETNYI BANK		
3411	EVROSOYuZ		
2402	EVROFINANS MOSNARBANK		
3161	EKATERINBURG		
2645	ENISEISKII OB'EDINENNYI BANK		
2647	FEDERAL'NYI BANK INNOVATsII I RAZVITIYa		
3071	FEDERAL'NYI DEPOZITNYI BANK		
2542	FIA-BANK		
2989	FONDSERVISBANK		
209	FONON		
2063	FORBANK		
2208	FORShTADT		
3284	GAZENERGOPROMBANK		
3090	GALABANK		
978	GALIChKOMBANK		
3275	GARANTI BANK-MOSKVA		
2576	GARANT-INVEST		
790	GELENDZhIK-BANK		
2438	GLOBUS		
3392	GORODSKOI KLIENTSKII		
3053	GRAND INVEST BANK		
1125	GRANKOMBANK		
1184	GRINKOMBANK		
1928	GRIS-BANK		
1049	HAKASSKII MUNITsIPAL'NYI BANK	Active	Official Website
3064	HANSABANK		
2092	HARD-BANK		
1114	HIMIK		
316	HKF BANK		
3283	HLEBNYI		
1812	HLEBOBANK		
254	HLYNOV		
503	HOLMSK		
1514	IBRR-BANK		
1949	IVANOVSKII OBLASTNOI BANK		
646	IZhKOMBANK		
1745	IZhLADABANK		
2407	IZBERBASh		
2291	IMPEKSBANK		
3191	INBANKPRODUKT		
3339	INVESTITsIONNYI BANK KUBANI		
2534	INVESTITsIONNYI GORODSKOI BANK		
3046	INVESTITsIONNYI PROMENERGOBANK		
2377	INVESTKAPITALBANK		
2766	INVESTSBERBANK		
2495	ING BANK (EVRAZIYa)		
3405	INKREDBANK		
2853	INTEGRAL		
2609	INTERNATsIONAL'NYI TORGOVYI BANK		
3266	INTERPROMBANK		
2688	INFORMBIZNESBANK		
2166	INFORMPROGRESS		
3026	IPOZEMBANK		
1724	IRONBANK		
3175	IS BANK		
520	ISTOK		
3063	IT-BANK		
2390	ITURUP		
2872	IFKO-BANK		
2802	IOShKAR-OLA		
1618	KAVKAZ-GELIOS		
1614	KAVKAZPROMSTROIBANK		
481	KAVKAZSKII KOMSEL'HOZBANK		
2888	KAZANSKII		
1151	KALUGA		
803	KAMABANK		
438	KAMSKII KOMMERChESKII BANK		
2966	KAMChATKA		
545	KAMChATKOMAGROPROMBANK		
1194	KAMChATPROMBANK		
1340	KAMChATRYBBANK		
860	KANSKII		
575	KAPITAL		
2625	KAPITAL KREDIT		
2547	KAPITALBANK		
2789	KAPITAL-MOSKVA		
2070	KARA-ALTYN		
639	KARABUDAHKENTSKII		
776	KAURI		
914	KBTs		
2055	KVOTA-BANK		
1574	KEDR		
96	KEMSOTsINBANK		
842	KETOVSKII KOMMERChESKII BANK		
2843	KIP-BANK		
1911	KIT FINANS INVESTITsIONNYI BANK		
3208	KITEZh		
2990	KLASSIK BANK		
2324	KLIENTSKII		
2216	KMB-BANK		
65	KOL'TsO URALA		
1293	KOMNEIVABANK		
122	KONVERSBANK		
2797	KONVERSBANK-MOSKVA		
2228	KONSTANS-BANK		
3184	KONTINENTAL'		
937	KONTO		
2148	KOR		
2245	KOSMOS		
1115	KOSTROMASEL'KOMBANK		
665	KOShEHABL'BANK		
3360	KRAIINVESTBANK		
2373	KRAINII SEVER		
2271	KRANBANK		
1569	KRASBANK		
1087	KRASKOMBANK		
2840	KRASNOYaRSKII SOTsIAL'NYI KOMMERChESKII BANK		
2584	KREDIT URAL BANK		
1197	KREDITINVEST		
5	KREDIT-MOSKVA		
2880	KREDITNYI AGROPROMBANK		
2891	KREDITSOYuZKOMBANK		
793	KREDO FINANS		
1165	KREDPROMBANK		
2905	KREMLEVSKII		
2607	KROSNA-BANK		
456	KRYLOVSKII		
1752	KS-BANK		
2898	KUBANSKII UNIVERSAL'NYI BANK		
98	KUBAN'		
2518	KUBAN' KREDIT		
478	KUBAN'TORGBANK		
2868	KUZBASSHIMBANK		
1158	KUZNETsKBIZNESBANK		
609	KUZNETsKII		
2254	KUZNETsKII MOST		
2568	KURGAN		
1218	KURGANPROMBANK		
735	KURSKPROMBANK		
2249	LAKMA		
1920	LANTA-BANK		
1343	LEVOBEREZhNYI		
1598	LESBANK		
1835	LESPROMBANK		
1605	LEFKO-BANK		
1242	LIPETsKKOMBANK		
2707	LOKO-BANK		
1134	MAIINSKII		
1136	MAIKOPBANK		
1037	MAIMA		
1673	MAISKII		
1088	MAK-BANK		
1859	MASS MEDIA BANK		
2176	MASTER-BANK		
2866	MAHAChKALINSKII GORODSKOI BANK		
3395	MBA-MOSKVA		
2620	MBR-BANK		
3039	MBTS-BANK		
1717	MBHHS		
2361	MDM-BANK		
2223	MDM-BANK-URAL		
3265	MEGAPOLIS		
2908	MEDPROMINVESTBANK		
3280	MEZhBIZNESBANK		
1987	MEZhDUNARODNYI AKTsIONERNYI BANK		
2704	MEZhDUNARODNYI BANK RAZVITIYa		
197	MEZhDUNARODNYI BANK SANKT-PETERBURGA		
2056	MEZhDUNARODNYI PROMYShLENNYI BANK		
3108	MEZhDUNARODNYI SOTsIAL'NYI BANK		
3163	MEZhDUNARODNYI FONDOVYI BANK		
3133	MEZhPROMBANK		
3171	MEZhREGIONAL'NYI POChTOVYI BANK		
2956	MEZhTOPENERGOBANK	Active	Official Website
3093	MEZhTORGBANK		
901	METALLURGIChESKII KOMMERChESKII BANK		
2443	METKOMBANK		
2003	METRAKOMBANK		
2548	METROBANK		
1639	METROPOL'		
419	MEChEL-BANK		
2788	MIB		
2742	MI-BANK		
3086	MIGROS		
3195	MIKO-BANK		
3423	MILLENNIUM BANK		
2244	MIRAF-BANK		
2961	MIHAILOVSKII PZhSB		
2065	MKB IM. S. ZhIVAGO		
532	MOBILBANK		
1276	MONChEBANK		
752	MORDOVPROMSTROIBANK		
469	MOROZOVSKKOMAGROBANK		
77	MORSKOI BANK		
899	MORSKOI KOMMERChESKII BANK		
2758	MORSKOI TORGOVO-PROMYShLENNYI BANK		
3247	MOSKVA-SITI		
2268	MOSKOVSKII BANK REKONSTRUKTsII I RAZVITIYa		
912	MOSKOVSKII INDUSTRIAL'NYI BANK		
3044	MOSKOVSKII KAPITAL		
1978	MOSKOVSKII KREDITNYI BANK	Active	Official Website
1411	MOSKOVSKII NEFTEHIMIChESKII BANK		
1751	MOSKOVSKII OBLASTNOI BANK		
2827	MOSKOMPRIVATBANK		
948	MOSSTROIEKONOMBANK		
2258	MOSTRANSBANK		
2468	MOSURALBANK		
2722	MSKB		
1052	MTI-BANK		
2103	MUNITsIPAL'NYI KAMChATPROFITBANK		
1731	MUNITsIPAL'NYI KOMMERChESKII BANK		
3356	MFT-BANK		
2469	NAVIGATOR		
2425	NADEZhNOST'		
3385	NAITOV		
695	NAL'ChIK		
1902	NARATBANK		
2873	NARODNYI ZEMEL'NO-PROMYShLENNYI BANK		
2795	NATsBIZNESBANK		
1414	NATsIONAL'NYI BANK RAZVITIYa		
3077	NATsIONAL'NYI INVESTITsIONNO-PROMYShLENNYI		
2755	NATsIONAL'NYI KOSMIChESKII BANK		
2170	NATsIONAL'NYI REZERVNYI BANK		
3087	NATsIONAL'NYI TORGOVYI BANK		
3296	NASh DOM		
1966	NBD-BANK		
970	NEREHTAKOMBANK		
825	NERYuNGRIBANK		
1423	NEFTYaNOI		
2859	NEFTYaNOI AL'YaNS		
1851	NIZhEGORODPROMSTROIBANK		
931	NIZhNEVOLZhSKII KOMMERChESKII BANK		
926	NIZhNII NOVGOROD		
702	NIKO-BANK		
2800	NOVA BANK		
840	NOVATsIYa		
2546	NOVIKOMBANK	Active	Official Website
1352	NOVOBANK		
1747	NOVOKIB		
576	NOVOKUBANSKII		
2865	NOVOKUZNETsKII MUNITsIPAL'NYI BANK		
467	NOVOPOKROVSKII		
410	NOVOSIBIRSKVNEShTORGBANK		
2786	NOVOSIBIRSKII MUNITsIPAL'NYI BANK		
2932	NOVYI MOSKOVSKII BANK		
3202	NOKSSBANK		
2650	NOOSFERA		
1738	NOSTA-BANK		
2274	NOYaBR'SKNEFTEKOMBANK		
3359	NR BANK		
3124	NS BANK		
1671	NEKLIS-BANK		
671	OBEREG		
3185	OBIBANK		
3345	OB'EDINENNYI BANK RAZVITIYa		
1016	OB'EDINENNYI BANK RESPUBLIKI		
2611	OB'EDINENNYI KAPITAL		
3406	OB'EDINENNYI KREDITNYI AL'YaNS		
2074	OB'EDINENNYI NATsIONAL'NYI BANK		
2328	OGNI MOSKVY		
1118	OKSKII		
2972	OLD-BANK		
1189	OMSK-BANK		
1693	OMSKII PROMSTROIBANK		
2484	ONEGO		
3312	ORGBANK		
3016	ORGRESBANK		
938	ORION		
2921	ORLOVSKII SOTsIAL'NYI BANK		
696	ORSKINDUSTRIYaBANK		
1143	OHABANK		
3375	OHOTNYI RYaD		
1860	PARITET		
1992	PARTNERBANK		
605	PERVOE OBSchESTVO VZAIMNOGO KREDITA		
652	PERVOMAISKII		
518	PERVOMAISKII		
965	PERVOURAL'SKBANK		
3271	PERVYI DORTRANSBANK		
3201	PERVYI KAPITAL		
1730	PERVYI RESPUBLIKANSKII BANK		
3291	PERVYI ChEShSKO-ROSSIISKII BANK		
2110	PERESVET		
784	PERMINVESTBANK		
875	PERM'		
2551	PETERBURGSKII SOTsIAL'NYI KOM. BANK		
3227	PETRO-AERO-BANK		
1776	PETROKOMMERTs		
1782	PIKO-BANK		
3166	PLATEZhNYI TsENTR		
2347	PLATINA		
2071	PLATO-BANK		
634	POVOLZhSKII		
2870	POVOLZhSKOE OVK		
1043	PODOL'SKPROMKOMBANK		
1019	POTENTsIAL		
1788	POChTOBANK		
779	PREDGOR'E		
2649	PREODOLENIE		
1141	PRIVOLZhSKOE OVK		
844	PRIKAM'E		
2733	PRIMSOTsBANK		
212	PRIO-VNEShTORGBANK		
3135	PRIORITET		
507	PRIPOLYaRNYI		
2537	PRISKO KAPITAL BANK		
1203	PRIUPSKBANK		
2412	PROBIZNESBANK		
2433	Prominvestbank	In liquidation	
2123	PROMREGIONBANK		
3251	PROMSVYaZ'BANK		
1659	PROMSERVISBANK		
1961	PROMTORGBANK		
2638	PROMTRANSBANK		
624	PROMFINSERVISBANK		
439	PROMYShLENNO-STROITEL'NYI BANK		
3307	PROMYShLENNOST' I FINANSY		
2410	PROMYShLENNO-FINANSOVOE SOTRUDNIChESTVO		
1792	PROMEK-BANK		
2728	PROMENERGOBANK		
235	PROFBANK		
874	PROHLADNYI		
589	PYaTIGORSK		
1675	RADIAN		
1166	RADIOTEHBANK		
3322	RASChETNAYa PALATA URVB		
103	RASChETNO-KREDITNYI BANK		
2174	RATIBOR-BANK		
3413	RBA		
539	REGIOBANK		
233	REGION		
2782	REGIONAL'NYI BANK RAZVITIYa		
836	REGIONAL'NYI KOMMERChESKII BANK		
1927	REGIONAL'NYI KREDIT		
1608	REGIONAL'NYI KREDITNYI BANK		
2652	REGIONINVESTBANK		
3357	REGIONFINANSBANK		
2364	REZERV		
3205	RESTAVRATsIYaSTROIBANK		
3393	RIAL-KREDIT		
1221	RIB-SIBIR'		
3262	RINVESTBANK		
1909	RINGKOMBANK		
2717	RINK-BANK		
2272	Rosbank	Active	Official Website
1573	ROSDORBANK		
3137	ROSEVROBANK		
226	ROSINTERBANK		
324	ROSSIISKII KREDIT		
1354	ROSSIISKII NATsIONAL'NYI KOMMERChESKII BANK		
3204	ROSSIISKII PROMYShLENNYI BANK		
3257	ROSSITA-BANK		
2813	ROSTOVSKII UNIVERSAL'NYI		
1705	ROSTPROMSTROIBANK		
101	ROS'		
2211	ROSENERGOBANK		
3324	RP SVMB		
2050	RSKB		
3076	RTB-BANK		
3401	RTS-BANK		
3129	RUBIN		
3098	RUBLEV		
2192	RUBLEVSKII		
2793	RUSICh TsENTR BANK		
2934	RUSSKIE FINANSOVYE TRADITsII		
2179	RUSSKII BANK RAZVITIYa		
2686	RUSSKII BANKIRSKII DOM		
2749	RUSSKII INVESTITsIONNYI BANK		
1793	RUSSKII INDUSTRIAL'NYI BANK		
1968	RUSSKII IPOTEChNYI BANK		
3123	RUSSKII MEZhDUNARODNYI BANK		
685	RUSSKII REGIONAL'NYI BANK		
1073	RUSSLAVBANK		
2313	RUSSOBANK		
704	RUS'		
3073	RUS'-BANK		
2093	RUSYuGBANK		
3231	REB		
3101	SAMARSKII KREDIT		
436	SANKT-PETERBURG	Active	Official Website
330	SARATOV		
2048	SAROVBIZNESBANK	Active	Official Website
224	SATURN		
1668	SAHALIN-VEST		
1857	S-BANK		
1743	SBERINVESTBANK		
2975	SVERDLOVSKII GUBERNSKII BANK		
1470	SVYaZ'-BANK		
1637	SDM-BANK		
2816	SEVERGAZBANK		
2264	SEVERINVESTBANK		
2083	SEVERNAYa KAZNA		
3317	SEVERNAYa KLIRINGOVAYa PALATA		
2398	SEVERNYI KREDIT		
2721	SEVERNYI NARODNYI BANK		
2768	SEVERO-VOSTOChNYI AL'YaNS		
2506	SEVERO-VOSTOChNYI INVESTITsIONNYI BANK		
106	SEL'MAShBANK		
2606	SEMBANK		
2720	SETEVOI NEFTYaNOI BANK		
1284	ShUMERLINSKII		
323	SIBAKADEMBANK		
2604	SIBIRSKII ENERGETIChESKII BANK		
2787	SIBIRSKOE SOGLASIE		
170	SIBIR'		
3042	SIBIR'GAZBANK		
2015	SIBSOTsBANK		
208	SIBES		
392	SIGMA		
653	SIMBIRSK		
2884	SINERGIYa		
2838	SINKO-BANK		
1904	SIR		
2846	SISTEMA		
3194	SITI INVEST BANK		
2557	SITIBANK	Active	Official Website
1957	SKA-BANK		
705	SKB-BANK		
383	SLAVYaNSKII BANK		
2960	SLAVYaNSKII KREDIT		
1121	SMOLEVICh		
2029	SMOLENSKII BANK		
1376	SNEZhINSKII		
1317	SOBINBANK		
558	SOVETSKII		
2302	SOVINKOM		
963	SOVKOMBANK	Active	Official Website
2923	SODRUZhESTVO		
2830	SOKOLOVSKII		
1329	SOLID BANK	Active	Official Website
554	SOLIDARNOST'		
2931	SOOTEChESTVENNIKI		
2867	SOFIYa		
1827	SOTsGORBANK		
1132	SOTsINVESTBANK		
2553	SOTsKREDITBANK		
1271	SOChI		
232	SOChIGAZPROMBANK		
2307	SOYuZ		
3236	SOYuZNYI		
236	SPETsSTROIBANK		
2207	SPURT		
1071	SPUTNIK		
2876	STABEK		
1288	STAVROPOL'PROMSTROIBANK		
1003	STANKOBANK		
1050	STAROOSKOL'SKII AGROPROMBANK		
2657	STARYI KREML'		
2948	STELLA-BANK		
2940	STROIBANK		
1667	STROIVESTBANK		
404	STROMKOMBANK		
3397	STRUKTURA		
2999	SUDOSTROITEL'NYI BANK		
2023	SUNZhA		
1338	SUPERBANK		
588	SURGUTNEFTEGAZBANK		
684	SURGUTSKII TsENTRAL'NYI KOMMERChESKII BANK		
1249	TAATTA		
2304	TAVRIChESKII		
3136	TAGANROGBANK		
1635	TAGILBANK		
963	БыстроЗайм	Active	Official Apps
2085	TAIDON		
826	TAL'MENKA-BANK		
1312	TAMBOVKREDITPROMBANK		
1951	TANDEM		
459	TARHANY		
728	TATAGROPROMBANK		
1732	TATINVESTBANK		
3058	TATFONDBANK		
256	TVER'		
777	TVER'UNIVERSALBANK		
1586	TETRAPOLIS		
2507	TOL'YaTTIHIMBANK		
1720	TOMSKPROMSTROIBANK		
2560	TOMSK-REZERV		
933	TORZhOKUNIVERSALBANK		
2210	TRANSKAPITALBANK		
2142	TRANSKREDITBANK		
2807	TRANSSTROIBANK		
3279	TRAST	Active	Official Website
2741	TRAST KAPITAL BANK		
3061	TRETII RIM		
1202	TUVAKREDIT		
2764	TEMBR-BANK		
2419	TYuMEN'ENERGOBANK		
2997	UGLEMETBANK		
1764	UDMURTSKII PENSIONNYI BANK		
2435	UMUT		
2525	UNIVERBANK		
2565	UNIVERSAL		
3021	UNIVERSALSTROIBANK		
3409	UNIVERSAL'NYI BANK SBEREZhENII		
667	URAIKOMBANK		
1522	URALVNEShTORGBANK		
153	URALPRIVATBANK		
2964	URALPROMBANK		
30	URALSIB	Active	Official Website
1370	URALFINANS		
3119	URALFINPROMBANK		
3326	URAL'SKAYa RASChETNAYa PALATA		
429	URAL'SKII BANK REKONSTRUKTsII I RAZVITIYa	Active	Official Website
249	URAL'SKII FINANSOVYI DOM		
1829	URAN		
1663	UHTABANK		
2673	TINKOFF	Active	Official Website
3037	TsENTRAL'NO-AZIATSKII		
2225	TsENTR-INVEST		
121	TsENTROKREDIT		
2991	TsENTURION		
2627	TsERIH		
485	ChELINDBANK		
493	ChELYaBINVESTBANK		
655	ChELYaBKOMZEMBANK		
1339	ChITAPROMSTROIBANK		
457	YuGBANK		
2772	YuG-INVESTBANK		
414	YuGO-VOSTOK		
880	YuGRA		
2409	YuZhNYI REGION		
3015	YuZhNYI REGIONAL'NYI BANK		
2478	YuZhNYI TORGOVYI BANK		
2771	YuNIASTRUM BANK		
2586	YuNIKOR		
3355	YuNION-TREID		
2848	YuNITBANK		
1060	YaDRINSKII		
2555	YaPY KREDI BANK MOSKVA		
2564	YaRINTERBANK		
2906	YaROSLAV		
1093	YaROSLAVICh		
1415	YaROSLAVSKII ZEMEL'NYI BANK		
828	YaRSOTsBANK		
99	ZhELDORBANK		
1139	ZhELEZNOVODSK		
817	ZARECh'E		
1239	ZELENOKUMSKII		
2900	ZEMSKII BANK	Active	Official Website
2559	ZIRAAT BANK (MOSKVA)		
2552	ZOLOTO-PLATINA BANK		

== See also ==
- Banking in Russia
- SPFS
- Lists of banks
