= Ak Bars Bank =

Russian commercial bank, headquartered in Kazan, Tatarstan, Russia

Ak Bars Bank Russian: Ак Барс Банк

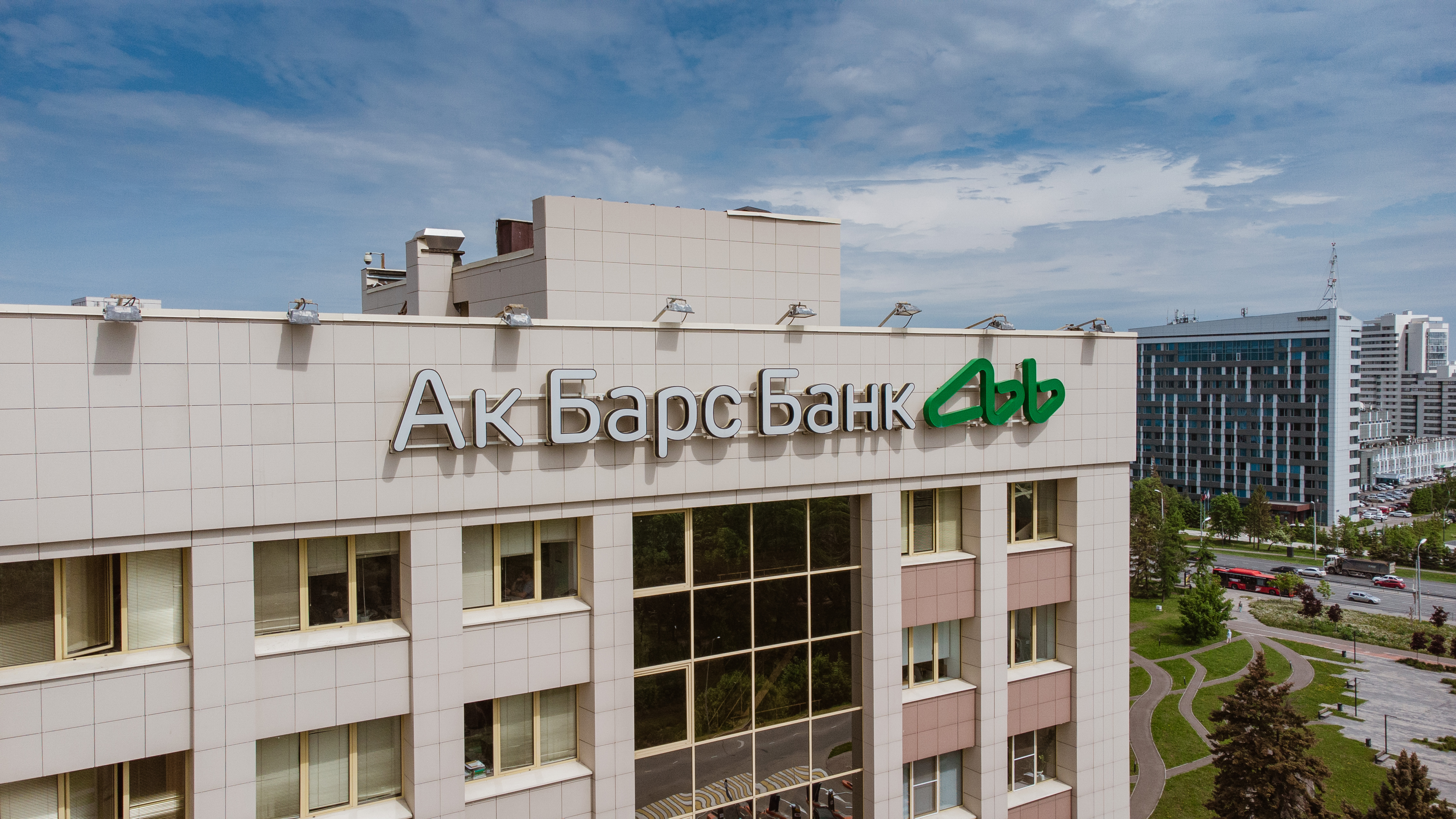
- Ak Bars Bank headquarters
- Company type: bank
- Industry: Banking
- Founded: 1993; 32 years ago
- Fate: active
- Headquarters: Kazan, Russia
- Revenue: 120,760,000,000 Russian ruble (2024)
- Operating income: 8,674,000,000 Russian ruble (2024)
- Net income: 7,269,000,000 Russian ruble (2024)
- Total assets: 946,923,000,000 Russian ruble (2024)
- Owner: Government of Tatarstan, Svyazinvestneftekhim, etc.
- Number of employees: 6300 (2022)
- Rating: «ruA», stable (Expert RA)
- Website: akbars.ru

PJSC Ak Bars Bank (Russian: Ак Барс Банк) is one of the leading Russian regional universal banks headquartered in Kazan, Tatarstan. The entity was registered on November 29, 1993, and as of June 2022 has 219 branches in 28 regions of the country.

== Membership in professional organizations ==
It's a member of SWIFT, Moscow Interbank Currency Exchange, Russian banks association etc.

== Key foreign correspondent banks ==
- Commerzbank AG (Germany),
- Deutsche Bank AG (Germany),
- Industrial and Commercial Bank of China (China),
- UBS AG (Switzerland),
- JPMorgan Chase Bank NA (United States),
- Deutsche Bank Trust Company Americas (United States),
- Türkiye İş Bankası A.S. (Turkey),
- MUFG Bank (Japan),
- OTP Bank Plc (Hungary),
- Agricultural Bank of China (China)

== Partnerships ==
It's a permanent partner of KAZANSUMMIT, Kazan Marathon, Kazan Digital Week and other regional events, previously was a partner of major sports events in Kazan, such as 2013 Summer Universiade, 2015 World Aquatics Championships, etc. Until the 2022 Russian invasion of Ukraine, the bank was audited by PricewaterhouseCoopers.

== Ak Bars Holding ==
The bank is known to have founded Ak Bars Holding back in 1998 as its investment banking subdivision, spinning it off as a separate entity at the end of 2004, whilst keeping 7.65% of its equity under own control. In June 2022, it has officially ensured that it is not a subsidiary, dependent or affiliated company of Ak Bars Holding once the latter has been included into the 2022 sanctioned entities list, presumably for ownership of Zelenodolsk Shipyard.

== See also ==
- List of banks in Europe
- List of banks in Russia
