= Raiffeisenbank (Russia) =

Russian bank

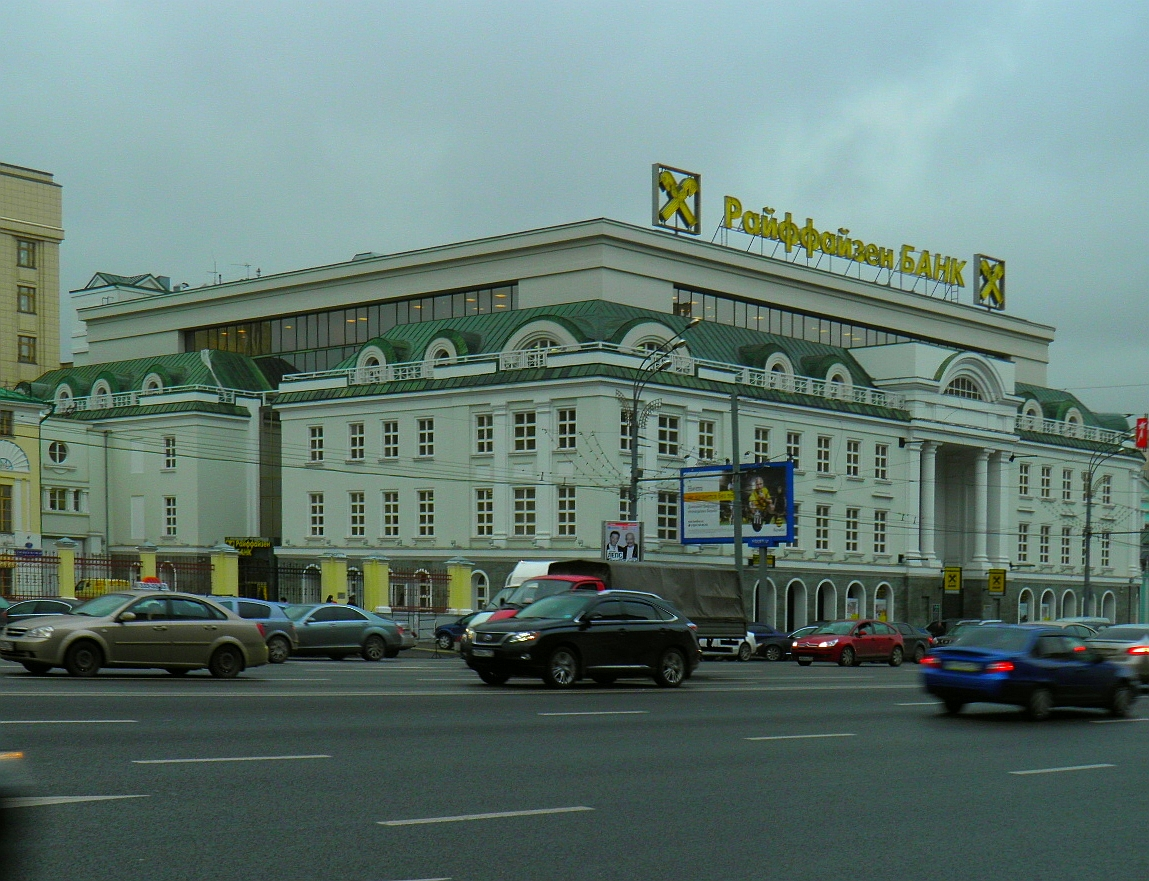
- Native name: Райффайзенбанк
- Type: Joint-stock company
- Industry: Financial services
- Founded: 1996
- Headquarters: Moscow, Russia
- Revenue: 252,058,126,000 Russian ruble (2023)
- Net income: RUB 38.078 billion (2020)
- Total assets: RUB 1448.967 billion (2020)
- Total equity: RUB 175.083 billion (2020)
- Parent: Raiffeisen Bank International
- Rating: Ba1 (Moody's), BBB (Fitch), BBB− (S&P) (2020)
- Website: www.raiffeisen.ru

AO Raiffeisenbank (Russian: АО «Райффайзенбанк») is a bank in Russia, subsidiary of Raiffeisen Bank International. It is a systemically important bank in Russia, headquartered in Moscow.

At the end of 2020, it ranked 7th among Russian banks in net profit (36.788 billion rubles), 10th in terms of assets (1,457.253 billion rubles) and 11th in terms of capital (189.236 billion rubles). In the Forbes World Best Banks list, published in April 2021, Raiffeisen Bank ranks first among Russian banks.

== History ==
Through Raiffeisen Bank International (RBI), the Raiffeisen Banking Group began to expand outside of Austria in 1986. RBI developed into a leading universal bank in Central and Eastern Europe with the largest branch network of all Western banking groups listed on the Vienna Stock Exchange.

Raiffeisenbank in Russia was founded in 1996. In 2001, a branch of the bank was opened in Saint Petersburg, in 2005 in Samara, Yekaterinburg, and Novosibirsk, and in 2006 in Krasnodar. In 2018, the bank begins to develop a digital presence that allows serving customers without physical branches. In 2019, Raiffeisenbank's virtual offices are open in 109 cities of Russia. At 2021, the geography of digital presence is more than 300 cities.

In 2006, Raiffeisenbank acquired 100% of the shares of JSC Impexbank. A year later, they were united under the unified brand of Raiffeisenbank CJSC and Raiffeisenbank became the largest bank with the participation of foreign capital in Russia (as of 2006).

In July 2021, Raiffeisen Bank International AG filed a lawsuit against the Arbitration Court of Moscow for recovery from PJSC "Mobile TeleSystems" about 615 million rubles. The third person is attracted by the Federal Antimonopoly Service (FAS) of Russia.

In September 2021, Raiffeisenbank launched a service for translating salaries on the fact of worked days, for which the daily salary calculation module was created. Project partner — Payday from VK (earlier — Mail.ru Group).

On September 13, 2023, the Bank of Russia canceled the license of Raiffeisenbank to operate as a specialized depository of investment funds, mutual funds and non-state pension funds. The cancellation occurred voluntarily, based on a statement from Raiffeisenbank.

== Key numbers ==
CIR indicator (COST to Income Ratio; The ratio of operating costs for income) for 2020 amounted to 37.8%, the cost of risk (COR) is 1.2%. The profitability of capital (ROE) at the end of 2020 amounted to 21.7% after payment of taxes, at the end of 2020 the share of impairment loans amounted to 3.5%.

Income Statement 2019-2020.
| | 2020, billions of rubles | 2019, billions of rubles | 12M 2020 / 12M 2019, change %/б.п. |
|---|---|---|---|
| Net interest income | 61,5 | 57,5 | 7,0 % |
| Net commission income | 22,6 | 21,3 | 6,0 % |
| Trading result | 10,0 | 9,7 | 3,6 % |
| Expenses for creating reserves* | -9,6 | -3,9 | 145,6 % |
| Operating expenses | -37,6 | -36,2 | 3,7 % |
| Profit before tax | 48,3 | 48,3 | -0,1% |
| Net profit | 38,1 | 37,6 | 1,2 % |
| Net interest margin | 4,9 % | 5,2 % | -26 б.п. |
| Net interest margin** | 4,7 % | 4,9 % | -17 б.п. |
| Cost of risk | 1,2 % | 0,5 % | 64 б.п. |
| Cost to income ratio | 39,5 % | 40,5 % | -92 б.п. |
| Cost to income ratio** | 37,8 % | 38,2 % | -37 б.п. |
| ROE before taxes | 27,4 % | 30,0 % | -255 б.п. |
| ROE after tax | 21,7 % | 23,4 % | -170 б.п. |

* Provision for impairment of loans, amounts due from other banks and cash and cash equivalents

** Adjusted for the reclassification of deductions to the FDIS from operating expenses to interest expenses

At the end of 2022, Raiffeisenbank received 141 billion rubles in net profit - four times more than a year earlier (38.7 billion rubles), taking second place after Sberbank. Due to restrictions on the withdrawal of funds to unfriendly countries, the profit could not be distributed as dividends and was capitalized. The total amount of the bank's equity increased compared to 2021 from 168 billion rubles to 305.3 billion rubles.

== Ratings and awards ==
In 2021, the American edition of Forbes called Raiffeisenbank as the best bank of Russia. A year earlier, Raiffeisenbank topped a list of 100 best banks in the country according to Forbes Russia magazine.

In 2019, the Cobranding Map of the loyalty of Lenta-Raiffeisenbank won in the nomination "Best Cobranding Map of the Bank and Retail" International Prize Loyalty Awards Russia. In the same year, Raiffeisenbank was recognized as the best foreign bank in Russia according to the international financial edition of Emea Finance.

In 2018, the International Consulting Company Korn Ferry Haygroup (KFHG) on the results of studies conducted in 2016 and 2017 included Raiffeisenbank in the Top-3 of the best employers in Russia among 50 companies.

In 2018, Euromoney magazine called Friedrich Wilhelm Raiffeisen "The best bank for private banking services for wealthy customers in Central and Eastern Europe". His work was also awarded award-winning Spear's Russia magazine in the nominations "Impeccable reputation in the banking industry" and "reference work with wealthy clients in Russia and abroad".

== See also ==
- UniCredit Bank Russia
- List of banks in Russia
