= Prime Corporate Center =

Office skyscraper in Warsaw, Poland

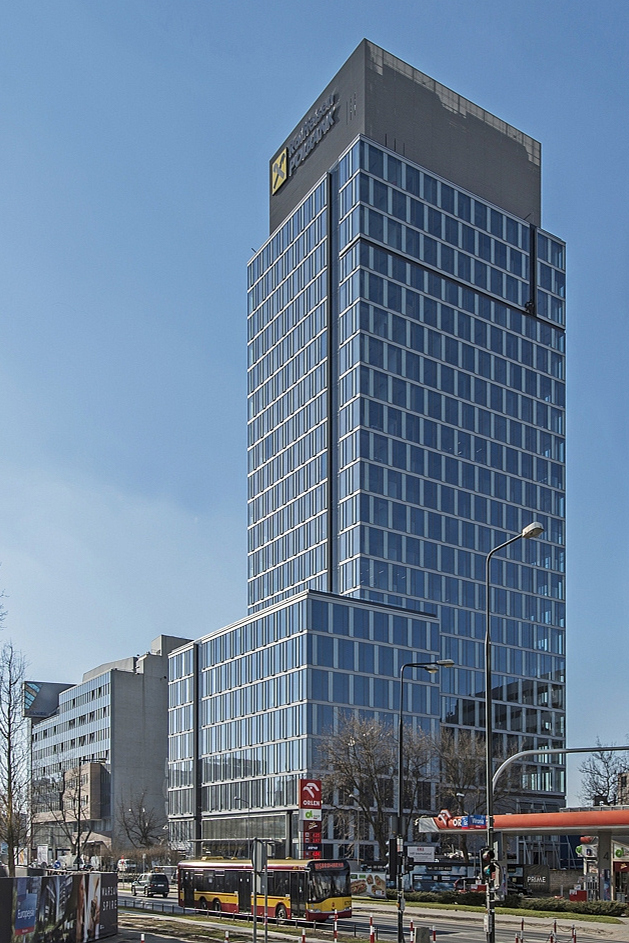
- The buildings in 2016.
- Interactive map of the Prime Corporate Center area

General information
- Type: Office skyscraper
- Architectural style: Modern; Constructivist; Neomodern; High-tech; International Style
- Location: Warsaw, Poland, 78 Grzybowska Street
- Coordinates: 52°14′02.47″N 20°59′03.70″E
- Construction started: April 2014
- Completed: April 2016
- Opened: March 2016
- Owner: Warburg-HIH Invest Real Estate

Height
- Tip: 96 m (315 ft)
- Roof: 83 m (272 ft)

Technical details
- Floor count: 23
- Floor area: 27,000 m^{2} (290,000 sq ft)

Design and construction
- Architecture firm: Solomon Cordwell Buenz; Epstein
- Developer: Golub GetHouse
- Main contractor: Warbud

The Prime Corporate Center, also simply known as Prime, is a skyscraper office building in Warsaw, Poland, located at 78 Grzybowska Street, in the neighbourhood of Mirów, within the district of Wola. It has 23 storeys, with the total height of 96 m, and the roof at 83 m. It was opened in 2016.

== History ==
Prime Corporate Center was an investment of Golub GetHouse. It was designed by Chicago-based architecture firm Solomon Cordwell Buenz, in cooperation with Warsaw-based Epstein. It was built between April 2014 and January 2016, with Warbud as the main contractor. Over 2000 people worked on its construction. It was opened in March 2016.

In 2014, Golub GetHouse rented 19,500 m² of the building space to Raiffeisen Bank Polsk, which became a single largest lease agreement in Poland of that year. For it, Golub GetHouse, together with management consulting firm Savills, were awarded the CIJ Award in the category Office Lease of the Year, by the Construction & Investment Journal. Currently, most of it is leased to the BNP Paribas Bank Polska.

In 2016, the building was sold to Warburg-HIH Invest Real Estate, for an estimated 90 million euros. It was modernised in 2024.

== Characteristics ==
The skyscraper has 23 storeys, with the total height of 96 m and the roof at 83 m. It has the floor area of 27,000 m², of which 20,148 m² is dedicated to office spaces. It also has 5 underground storeys, which include a large car park. The building has consists of two parts, a smaller wide rectangular cuboid base, and a taller tower placed at its back. It has a glass panel elevation with LED installations around windows. Its design style incorporates various elements from modernism, constructivism, neomodernism, high-tech, and international style. The building includes a fuel power generator, meant to keep it functioning during a city-wide blackout. The property meets the requirements of the international BREEAM environmental certificate.
