= Government of Tatarstan =

Government of the Republic of Tatarstan
- Tatar: Татарстан Республикасы Министрлар Кабинеты

Overview
- Established: 1991
- State: Tatarstan, Russia
- Website: prav.tatarstan.ru

The Government of the Republic of Tatarstan (Tatar: Татарстан Республикасы Министрлар Кабинеты, romanized: Tatarstan Respublikası Ministrlar Qäbinetı) under the purview of the Government of Russia exercises executive power and administrative control over Tatarstan. Members of government are Head (Rais) of the Republic of Tatarstan, Chairman of the Republic of Tatarstan and Cabinet Ministers. Its legal framework is governed both by the Constitution of the Republic of Tatarstan signed on April 19, 2002 and the Constitution of the Russian Federation.
