= KAZANSUMMIT =

Business convention held annually in Kazan, Russia

International Economic Summit "Russia-Islamic World: KazanSummit"
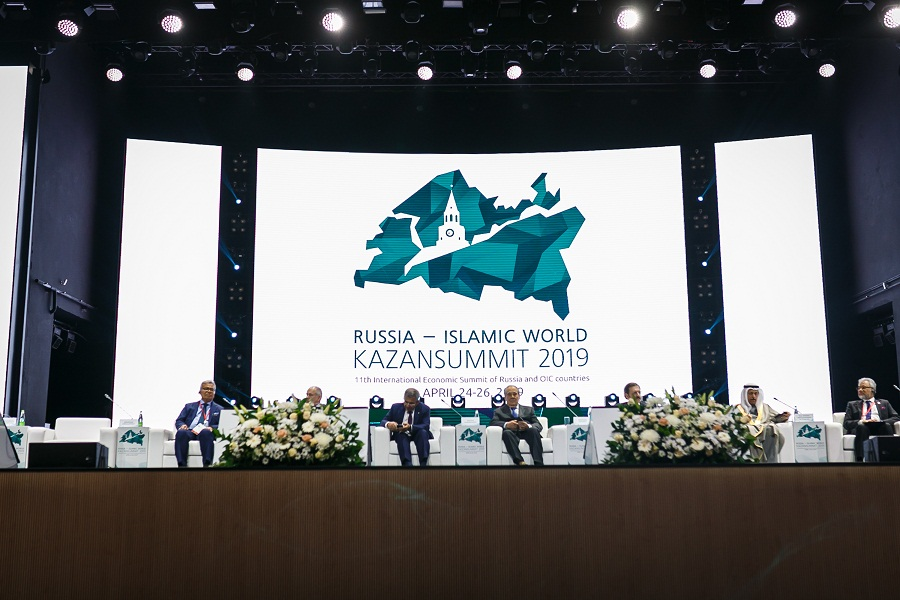
- Kazan Summit 2019
- Genre: International economic/business forum
- Frequency: Annual
- Locations: Kazan, Russia
- Founded: 2009
- Patron: President of Republic of Tatarstan
- Organiser: the Government of the Republic of Tatarstan, Tatarstan Investment Development Agency, and Autonomous non-profit organization "Directorate of International programs"
- Website: www.kazansummit.com

KAZANSUMMIT (International Economic Summit “Russia — Islamic World: KazanSummit”) is one of the leading international economic events of the Russian Federation and the Organization of Islamic Cooperation (OIC). From the first day of its existence, the Summit has been held under the patronage of the President of the Republic of Tatarstan, Rustam Minnikhanov. Since 2009, KazanSummit is held annually and strongly supported by the Federation Council of the Federal Assembly of the Russian Federation and the Government of the Republic of Tatarstan. Top international investment conference remains the main and unique platform for cooperation between the Russian Federation and the OIC member states.

== Aim ==
According to the Charter of the International Economic Summit “Russia-Islamic World: KazanSummit”, the aim of the Summit is a strengthening trade, economic, scientific, technical, social and cultural ties of the Republic of Tatarstan and members countries of the Organization of Islamic Cooperation, as well as to promote the development of Islamic financial system institutions in the Russian Federation. The Summit allows participants to succeed in developing a fruitful partnership and establishing useful business contacts.

== Objectives ==
The objectives of the KazanSummit are:

- development of recommendations in determining strategic prospects for the development of international economic relations between the Summit participants;
- assistance in strengthening the relations of participants in business activities of the Russian Federation, the Commonwealth of Independent States and countries of the Organization of Islamic Cooperation;
- involvement of leading world experts in a joint discussion of current economic and political problems (issues);
- development of recommendations and legislative initiatives aimed at solving problems in the field of the Islamic financial system institutions and the Russian economy functioning;
- organization of the exchange of experience of successful practices in implementing financial projects;
- attracting foreign direct investment in the economy of the Republic of Tatarstan.

== Mission ==
The Summit’s mission is to maintain the established contacts between Russia and the countries of Islamic World, take measures to create a positive image of Russia in the countries of OIC and countries of OIC in Russia, and to promote the projects of the Republic of Tatarstan and other Russian regions at the international level.

The regions of the Russian Federation get the opportunity to show their potential for domestic and foreign investors, companies from around the world are allowed to expand the distribution areas of their goods and services, government representatives have the ability to gain experience from their foreign colleagues and reach a new level of interaction.

The Summit is attended by the representatives of international organizations, public authorities, foreign states’ embassies, investors and businessmen of domestic and foreign financial institutions from different countries of the world and also the representatives of mass media.

During the event the participants discuss the problems, gain new knowledge, exchange experience, conclude contracts and find new business partners. The special attention is given to the acquaintance of the Russian structures to the Islamic finances and Islamic banking system. Besides, during the event the forums and conferences on the theme of halal industry development, features of Waqf, etc. are held. It is worth noting that in addition to the events with Islamic specifics, various seminars, meetings, discussions on general and narrow-profile topics are held. So, at the Summits in different years the issues of ecology, attractiveness of Russian regions for the investors, export and foreign economic relations, agriculture and tourism were discussed. In parallel to the meetings of participants the exhibitions, bilateral meetings, forums of young diplomats and entrepreneurs, presentations of start-ups for the potential investors are held. The guests get acquainted with the culture of Russia and Tatarstan.

Statistics of KazanSummit participants by year:
2009	2010	2011	2012	2013	2014	2015	2016	2017	2018	2019	2021
250	400	772	1000	700	500	745	1556	2641	3000	3598	4735

Statistics of KazanSummit participating countries by year:
2009	2010	2011	2012	2013	2014	2015	2016	2017	2018	2019	2021
18	24	27	30	40	25	46	51	53	53	72	64

== History ==
2009

KAZANSUMMIT was first held from June 25 to 26, 2009, in Kazan. The prospect of closer reapproachment between Russia and the Islamic world has been emerged in 2003 when Vladimir Putin took part in the meeting of the most important international institution of the Islamic world - the Organization of Islamic Cooperation (OIC), held in Kuala Lumpur, Malaysia. The OIC observed that the result has been assigned to Russia in June 2005.

KAZANSUMMIT 2009 was conducted on five academic and business sessions and one final panel discussion on the prospects of Islamic finance in Russia. The organizers were the IFC Linova (Tatarstan, Russia), the Islamic Research and Training Institute (Saudi Arabia), Kuala Lumpur Business School (Malaysia), and the Russian Center for Islamic Economics and Finance(Tatarstan, Russia).

The idea of holding such an event in the capital of Tatarstan came up in June 2008 in conjunction with the Islamic Development Bank, in the International Investment Conference.

It was attended by 250 people from the Kingdom of Saudi Arabia, the United Arab Emirates, Morocco, Malaysia, Indonesia, Pakistan, Qatar, Lebanon, Bahrain, Sudan, Great Britain, France, Luxembourg, Turkey, Kazakhstan, Kyrgyzstan, Azerbaijan, Russia and other countries. The event included a special presentation of the Russian Federation and the Republic of Tatarstan, as well as academic and business sessions

2010

On June 27, 2010 in the "Pyramid", the opening of KAZANSUMMIT 2010 was held, with the participation of President of Tatarstan Rustam Minnikhanov and the International Islamic Business and Finance group. The forum was from June 27 to 28. It was held under the slogan "Kazan - New Gateway to Russia." At the official opening ceremony of KAZANSUMMIT 2010 were Minnikhanov, Ex Premier of Malaysia Dr. Mahathir Mohamad, Member of the House of Lords Mohamed Iltaf Sheikh, manager of the Islamic Corporation for Private Sector Development Khaled Al-Aboodi, Advisor to the Secretary General of OIC Nabiki Diallo, and Russia's permanent representative to the OIC Kamil Iskhakov. The forum consisted of the Strategic Forum, the exhibition "Innovations and Investments," the investment Forum, and the Halal Forum.

2011

The third KAZANSUMMIT was held on June 20–21, 2011. Minnikhanov, Prime Minister of Tatarstan Ildar Khalikov, Kamil, the Chairman of the Organizing Committee of KAZANSUMMIT, head of the Investment Promotion Agency Linar Yakupov, Assistant Plenipotentiary of the Russian Federation President in the Volga Federal District Muaed Kankulov, and the foreign guests, including the General Director of the Islamic Centre for Development of Trade (ICDT with OIC) Allan Rushdie, who is a member of the UK House of Lords, and Lord Nazir Ahmed. They participated at the opening ceremony of KAZANSUMMIT 2011 of Islamic Business and Finance. The conference covered the following topics:

- Increasing stability and openness of Islamic financial markets and institutions
- The development of human capital, education and training in Islamic economics and finance
- The development of Islamic finance in the traditional financial system: challenges, approaches and solutions
- The role of Islamic social and economic institutions in the process of economic development
- Study of the development of Islamic finance in Russia
- History of Islamic economic thought and economic management
- The role of the state in creating the Islamic economic model
- Impact of Islamic principles of microeconomic management - fiscal, monetary and financial policy
- The value of Islamic principles for microeconomic institutions and market discipline
- Economic doctrines and values of Islam

2012

KAZANSUMMIT 2012, the economic cooperation between Russia, other countries, and members of the Organization of Islamic Cooperation was held on May 17–18. The program included the strategic and investment forum, the conference on Islamic economics and finance, a conference of representatives of the parliaments of the OIC, and round-table discussions on various topics, as well as business meetings at various levels. The forum was traditionally attended by President of Tatarstan Rustam Minnikhanov. According to the Tatarstan Investment Development Agency, 96 projects worth 289 billion rubles were presented. KAZANSUMMIT went to a higher level thanks to the support of the Council of Federation Assembly of the Russian Federation.

2013

Another KazanSummit was held on October 2–3, 2013. Representatives of 40 countries of the world met with Russian authorities and businessmen to discuss prospects for the development of economic cooperation between Russia and the countries of the Organization of Islamic Cooperation.

Among the high-ranking guests were OIC Secretary General Ekmeleddin Ihsanoglu, Deputy Minister of Qatar, Deputy Minister of Economy of the UAE, Chairman of the Board of WAIPA, Ambassadors of Malaysia, Saudi Arabia, Morocco, Sudan, Senegal, Nigeria, Pakistan, Palestine, Kazakhstan, Mexico, etc.

The topics of the Summit concerned both trade cooperation between Russia and the countries of the Organization of Islamic Cooperation, as well as current trends in the Islamic finance market. By tradition, several summit events were dedicated to the topic of investments. In addition, a media forum was held at the Kazan summit, where media leaders discussed the role of the press in the investment attractiveness of the country, as well as a separate forum dedicated to smart cities, where Tatarstan mega-projects Innopolis and Smart City Kazan were presented ".

During the summit, the participants discussed such major problems as ensuring world food security, the development of the Islamic economy and finance, investment, etc.

2014

KAZANSUMMIT 2014 took place 5–6 June 2014.The event was organized by the Nonprofit fund for the development of Islamic business and finance (IBFD Fund) and co-organized by the Tatarstan Investment Development Agency. The key topic of the strategic forum was the investors, business and government interaction in solving food security problems in Russia and the OIC countries. It was attended by 500 representatives from 25 countries, including 30 parliamentarians and 20 ambassadors. In addition to participants from OIC countries, representatives of European countries, participants from Cuba, Ecuador, Singapore, the UAE, Qatar and other countries visited Kazan. Russia was represented at the summit by participants from Moscow, St. Petersburg, Kamchatka, Bashkortostan, Orenburg, Sverdlovsk, Rostov, Nizhny Novgorod, Samara, Tomsk regions. A special event within the framework of KazanSummit 2014 was the second meeting of the "Investors Club of the Republic of Tatarstan".

2015

The 7th International Economic Summit of Russia and the OIC countries KazanSummit 2015 was held on June 15–16. 746 people from 45 countries of the world attended the event. Also among visitor there were Ahmed Galal Eldin, the chairman of the Association IBIA, Necdet Sensoy, Member of the Central Bank of Turkey Board of Directors, Victor Chetverikov, the president of the National Rating Agency and Vladimir Korovkin, Head of Innovations and Digital Research. In 2015, Ahmed Mohamed Ali Al-Madani, the President of the Islamic Development Bank visited the Summit. Islamic finance for constructive global trade and investment was the main theme of the VII International economic summit of Russia and OIC members countries in 2015. The Islamic financial industry is an economic tool for the development of trade, attracting investment and effective cooperation of Russia with the countries of the Islamic world.

Participants discussed the cooperation between Russia and the OIC countries and Islamic banking. For the first time, there was the Forum of Young Entrepreneurs which became a traditional event of the Summit.

2016

In 2016, the summit was held for the eighth time. In December 2015, according to the Decree of the President of the Republic of Tatarstan, the event was renamed the "VIII International Economic Summit" Russia - Islamic World: KazanSummit 2016. The number of participants increased sharply - 1556 people from 51 countries.

2017

The key topic of KazanSummit 2017 was Islamic investments in the context of international economic relations. A leading international platform has been created to discuss issues of cooperation and implementation of joint projects, as well as an opportunity to present economic and investment potential of Russia.

KazanSummit 2017 brought together 2641 participants from international organizations, federal and local authorities, financial institutions, embassies of 15 states, members of parliament, investors and businessmen, representing 53 country, and 250 journalists. This was the largest event for the entire 9-year history of the summit.

2018

The X International Economic Summit "Russia-the Islamic world: KazanSummit" was in Kazan on May 10–12, 2018. The Summit was attended by 3,000 people from 53 countries and 27 regions of Russia. For the tenth time, the platform in Kazan brought together representatives of international organizations, public authorities, financial institutions, embassies, members of Parliament, leading investors and businessmen, top managers of Russian and foreign companies.

2019

XI International Economic Summit “Russia-Islamic World: KazanSummit 2019” was held on April 24–26, 2019 in Kazan city. More than 3,500 representatives of 72 countries and 38 regions of Russia, 12 Ambassadors and more than 250 media representatives took part in the Summit. More than 50 sessions were held in areas such as Islamic finance and partner banking, the halal industry, export development, socially oriented business, youth entrepreneurship and youth diplomacy, the development of the film industry, the sports heritage of championships and others, which were relevant for the development of partnership with countries of the Islamic world.

The International halal industry exhibition “Russia Halal Expo” was held in the framework of the Summit. In 2019 the total expo area was increased by more than 3,5 times and reached 5 thousand square meters. The exhibition was attended by 8 countries, 13 regions and 2000 visitors. Such industries as food, clothing, finance, tourism, education, IT, medicine and non-food products were represented at Russia Halal Expo.

For the first time in the framework of the Summit a platform for the fruitful dialogue between private investors, owners of industrial real estate, authors of innovative projects and authorities was developed. So, as part of the PARKI Industrial Parks Forum, the best practices of world-class experts, successful entrepreneurs and businessmen were considered-real cases for developing business in the territory of industrial parks. The Industrial Parks Forum brought together 3 key components of successful business: investments, technologies, infrastructure and also more than 2000 guests and participants from 30 countries and Russian regions. In the Parki exhibition hall 40 stands of companies-partners and investors were presented.

Since 2017 “Sberbank” has been holding traditional business meetings within the framework of the KazanSummit. At the discussion platform of the Summit in 2019 the results of study on the introduction of Islamic financial instruments into the business model of Sberbank were presented. Besides the session participants discussed the current development of Islamic finance in Russia and potential of cooperation of the Russian entrepreneurs and the partners from the Persian Gulf countries. The event presented the capabilities of the new Islamic fintech project PayZakat-a digital payment system for collecting and distributing donations based on artificial intelligence. With the help of chat bots, users calculate the payment, distribute it among trusted charitable foundations and choose projects for donation. The aim of the project is to increase transparency and accountability of the entire charity process, including as a result of the refusal to use cash. At the initiative of Tatarstan Investment Development Agency a partnership agreement between “VAQF KAZAN” Fund and PlayZakat platform was signed.

42 agreements were signed on the sidelines of the Summit, including the Cooperation Agreement between the Russian Islamic Institute and Accounting and Auditing Organization for Islamic Financial Institutions (AAOIFI, Bahrain), the Memorandum of Cooperation between the Spiritual Administration of Muslims of the Republic of Tatarstan and Management company “Ak Bars Capital”, Agreement on the creation of the Fund for the construction of the Cathedral Mosque in Kazan, Memorandum of understanding between the Tashkent region of the Uzbekistan republic and Joint-Stock company “Innovative industrial park-Technopark in the field of information technology IT-park”, technopolis “Khimgrad” and others.

In 2020, due to the declaration of an emergency situation by the World Health Organization due to the outbreak of a new coronavirus infection, the XII International Economic Summit "Russia-the Islamic World: KAZANSUMMIT 2020" was postponed to 2021.

2021

The XII International Economic Summit "Russia — the Islamic World: KazanSummit 2021" was held in Kazan from July 28 to 30. The event was held on the territory of the Kazan Expo International Exhibition Center. The leitmotif of KazanSummit 2021 was conscious consumption. Within the framework of the summit, more than 90 business sessions were held, more than 20 agreements were signed between representatives of countries, regions, and businesses. The key topics of the business program were: partner finance, halal industry, youth diplomacy, medicine, sports, creative industries, export development, entrepreneurship and investment. The exhibition Russia Halal Expo-2021 was held at the Kazan Expo site, where 113 exhibitors were represented, including the stands of Indonesia, the Republic of Turkey, the Republic of Kazakhstan, the Republic of Azerbaijan, the Republic of Kyrgyzstan, the Export Support Center of the Ulyanovsk Region, the Centralized religious Organization "Spiritual Assembly of Muslims of the Russian Federation", The Committee on the Halal Standard of the Republic of Tatarstan, ICCIA, SICPA, the Stand of the SDGs (Sustainable Development Goals), the stand of the International Association of Islamic Business, PJSC AK BARS Bank, Tatneft, PWC, JSC Rosselkhozbank, T-Family (Skullcap), Kunak Coffee, Atilab, the Halal Digital Ecosystem, the Huzur Publishing House, the International Center for Certification and Standardization "Halal" at the Russian Duma and many others.

In 2021, for the first time, an International Engineering Cluster Forum was held on the sidelines of the Summit.The forum was attended by leading experts from various regions of the Russian Federation and foreign countries, such as Belgium, Germany, Italy, China, the USA, France, Japan, Switzerland and many others. Traditionally, among the participants: heads of subjects and municipalities, ministries and departments, industrial enterprises, engineering centers, institutions of higher education. In 2021, 24 companies took part in the forum.

For the first time at KazanSummit, fashion designer, member of the Paris Syndicate of Haute Couture and pret-a-port, People's Artist of Russia Valentin Yudashkin presented his collection as part of the Modest Fashion Day, which was held in Kazan at the XII International Economic Summit "Russia-the Islamic World: KazanSummit" with the support of the National Chamber of Fashion. Modest Fashion Day was opened by a business program: 16 Russian and foreign experts discussed the development and prospects of" decent fashion", as well as ways to support talented designers. On the evening of July 28, a fashion show of decent fashion took place: 9 talented modest fashion designers presented their collections, reflecting the new aesthetics of modesty and modernity: Igor Gulyaev, designer of the Fashion House IGORGULYAEV, as well as Guzelem, ZUHAT, Su.Su, Eva Graffova, Alsu Gilmi, SAHARA, Measure.

During the Plenary session of the VII Machine-Building Cluster Forum: "Partnership of Russian enterprises with Islamic countries and big challenges for industry in the era of the digital pandemic" Maxim Reshetnikov, Minister of Economic Development of the Russian Federation, called on Islamic companies to invest in Russian digital and" green " projects.

A session of Sberbank was held in the Sberbank business communication zone. The central topic of the conversation this year was ESG-the transformation of regions. The President of the Republic of Tatarstan noted that Tatarstan is aimed at working very closely with Sberbank, as one of the locomotives of introducing the latest trends, including in the field of ESG.

Date of the event	Data on participants	Program description, forum details	Volume of signed agreements
June 25–26, 2009	250 participants from the Kingdom of Saudi Arabia, the United Arab Emirates, Morocco, Malaysia, Indonesia, Pakistan, Qatar, Lebanon, Bahrain, Sudan, Great Britain, France, Luxembourg, Turkey, Kazakhstan, Kyrgyzstan, Azerbaijan, Russia and other countries.	Special presentation of the Russian Federation and the Republic of Tatarstan, as well as Business session and Academic session	no data available
June 27–28, 2010	400 people, from 24 countries of Southeast Asia, the Middle East, Europe and Africa (Russian Federation, Bahrain, Belgium, Bosnia and Herzegovina, Great Britain, Germany, Hong Kong, Indonesia, Italy, Yemen, Kazakhstan, Kuwait, Lebanon, Luxembourg, Malaysia, UAE, Palestine, Pakistan, Saudi Arabia, Sudan, USA, Turkey, France)	Seminar of consulting and legal companies. Round table on Islamic patronage. Meeting of the International Business Association. Strategic Forum Investment Forum Conference on Islamic Economics and Finance	no data available
June 20–21, 2011	772 participants from 27 countries of the world.	Strategic Forum Investment Forum Conference on Islamic Economics and Finance Round tables	no data available
May 17–18, 2012	1000 participants from the Russian Federation, Azerbaijan, Bahrain, Belgium, Brazil, Bosnia and Herzegovina, Great Britain, Germany, Hong Kong, Indonesia, Iran, Italy, Yemen, Kazakhstan, Cyprus, China, Kuwait, Lebanon, Luxembourg, Malaysia, Morocco, UAE, Ukraine, Palestine, Pakistan, Belarus, Saudi Arabia, Sultanate of Oman, Sudan, USA, Turkey, France, Switzerland, Japan	The program included strategic and investment forums, round tables, as well as a conference on Islamic economics and financ	no data available
October 2–3, 2013	700 participants from 40 countries and 16 regions of Russia	Within the framework of the Summit, sessions on Islamic finance, smart cities, investment promotion were held, issues of trade cooperation between Russia and the OIC countries were discussed	no data available
June 5–7, 2014	500 representatives from 25 countries, including Cuba, Ecuador, Singapore, the United Arab Emirates, Qatar, etc.	During the summit, the participants discussed such major issues as ensuring world food security, the development of the Islamic economy and finance, investment, etc.	An agreement has been signed between the Republic of Tatarstan and X5
June 15–16, 2015	745 people from 45 countries of the world, such as Russia, Saudi Arabia, Turkmenistan, Egypt, Turkey, Pakistan, UAE, Somalia, Kazakhstan, Iran, Malaysia, Great Britain, Luxembourg, Italy, Morocco, Palestine, Tajikistan, Mauritius, Qatar, Netherlands, Latvia, Azerbaijan, Nigeria, Brunei Darussalam, Algeria, Indonesia, Korea, Zambia, Iraq, China, South Africa, Uzbekistan, Kyrgyzstan, India, Georgia, Yemen, Philippines, Jordan, Afghanistan, Bangladesh, Lebanon, Switzerland, Macedonia, Hungary, Bahrain, Czech Republic.	The topics of cooperation between Russia and the Organization of Islamic Cooperation, Islamic banking were discussed. For the first time, the Forum of Young Entrepreneurs of the OIC countries was held, which became a traditional event of the Summit.	no data available
May 19–21, 2016	1556 representatives from 51 countries of the world, such as Qatar, Uganda, Mauritania, Kuwait, the Islamic Republic of Pakistan, Burkina Faso, Sudan, Mozambique, Turkey, Tunisia, the Kyrgyz Republic, representatives of Saudi Arabia, the United Arab Emirates and many others.	Within the framework of the business program of the event, issues of Islamic finance and banking, the halal industry, trade and export were discussed. The Forum of Young Entrepreneurs of the OIC countries was held for the second time.	12 different agreements, resolutions and memoranda
May 18–21, 2017	2641 participants from 53 countries such as Albania, Algeria, Burkina Faso, Guinea, Iraq, Kyrgyzstan, Mauritania, Mozambique, Oman, Saudi Arabia, Tunisia, UAE, Turkey, Azerbaijan, Great Britain, Hungary, Egypt, Yemen, Iran, Kazakhstan, Cameroon, Qatar, China, the United States and many others.	A leading international platform has been created to discuss issues of cooperation and the implementation of joint projects, as well as to help present the economic opportunities and investment potential of our country	18 agreements
10-12 May 2018	The participants of the X International Economic Summit "Russia — the Islamic World: KazanSummit" were 3,000 people from 53 countries, such as Abkhazia, Azerbaijan, Algeria, Bangladesh, Bahrain, Belarus, Benin, Bosnia and Herzegovina, Burkina Faso, Great Britain, Hungary, Gabon, Germany, Ghana, Guinea, Guinea-Bissau, Georgia, Denmark, Djibouti, Egypt, Zimbabwe, India, Indonesia, Jordan, Iraq, Iran, Italy, Yemen, Kazakhstan, Cameroon, Qatar, Kyrgyzstan, China, Kuwait, Lebanon, Libya, Mauritania, Macedonia, Malaysia, Mali, Malta, Morocco, Mozambique, Nepal, Niger, Nigeria, United Arab Emirates, Oman, Isle of Man, Poland, Pakistan, Palau, Palestine, Romania, Russia, Saudi Arabia, Serbia, Somalia, Sudan, Sierra Leone, Tunisia, Turkmenistan, Turkey, Uganda and 27 regions of Russia-Astrakhan Region, Vologda Region, Kabardino-Balkar Republic, Kaliningrad Region, Kirov Region, Leningrad Region, Lipetsk Region, Moscow, Moscow Region, Nizhny Novgorod Region, Orel Region, Penza	The Summit has established itself as a successful business platform for establishing new contacts, as well as an aid for presenting economic opportunities and investment potential of Russia.	10 agreements
April 24–26, 2019	More than 3,500 people, 72 countries — Abkhazia, Azerbaijan, Algeria, Bangladesh, Bahrain, Belarus, Benin, Bosnia and Herzegovina, Burkina Faso, Great Britain, Hungary, Gabon, Germany, Ghana, Guinea, Guinea-Bissau, Georgia, Denmark, Dagestan, Djibouti, Egypt, Zimbabwe, India, Indonesia, Jordan, Iraq, Iran, Italy, Yemen, Kazakhstan, Cameroon, Kyrgyzstan, China, Lebanon, Libya, Mauritania, Macedonia, Malaysia, Mali, Malta, Morocco, Mozambique, Nepal, Niger, Nigeria, United Arab Emirates, Oman, Isle of Man, Poland, Pakistan, Palau, Palestine, Russia, Romania, Saudi Arabia, Serbia, Somalia, Sudan, USA, Sierra Leone, Tajikistan, Tunisia, Turkmenistan, Turkey, Uganda, Uzbekistan, Ukraine, France, Switzerland, Estonia, South Africa, South Korea. 38 regions of Russia Astrakhan Region, Vologda Region, Kabardino-Balkar Republic, Kaliningrad Region, Kirov Region, Leningrad Region, Lipetsk Region, Moscow, Moscow Region, Nizhny Novgorod Region, Orel Region, Penza Region, Primorsky	More than 50 sessions were held on such relevant areas for the development of the Islamic world as Islamic finance and partner banking, the halal industry, export development, and socially oriented business.	42 agreements
July 28–30, 2021	More than 4,500 people, 64 countries — Abkhazia, Azerbaijan, Algeria, Bangladesh, Bahrain, Belarus, Benin, Bosnia and Herzegovina, Burkina Faso, Great Britain, Hungary, Gabon, Germany, Ghana, Guinea, Guinea-Bissau, Georgia, Dagestan, Djibouti, Egypt, India, Indonesia, Jordan, Iraq, Iran, Italy, Yemen, Kazakhstan, Kazakhstan, Kyrgyzstan, China, Lebanon, Libya, Mauritania, Macedonia, Malaysia, Mali, Malta, Morocco, Mozambique, Nepal, Niger, Nigeria, UAE, Oman, Isle of Man, Poland, Pakistan, Palau, Palestine, Russia, Romania, Saudi Arabia, Serbia, Somalia, Sudan, USA, Sierra Leone, Tajikistan, Tunisia, Turkmenistan, Turkey, Uganda, Uzbekistan, Ukraine, France, Switzerland, Estonia, South Africa, South Korea. 41 regions of Russia Astrakhan Region, Vologda Region, Kabardino-Balkar Republic, Kaliningrad Region, Kirov Region, Leningrad Region, Lipetsk Region, Moscow, Moscow Region, Nizhny Novgorod Region, Orel Region, Penza Region, Primorsky Krai,	Within the framework of the Forum, more than sessions on topical areas, master classes on the areas of work of the Chamber of Commerce and Industry, trainings, consulting sessions, consulting meetings with coaches and experts in various fields, excursions were held. Among the key topics of the business program: partner finance, halal industry, youth diplomacy, medicine, sports, creative industries, export development, entrepreneurship and investment. The event will also host the halal industry exhibition Russia Halal Expo and the Machine-Building Cluster Forum.	20 agreements

== High-ranking guests ==
- MINNIKHANOV Rustam- President of the Republic of Tatarstan, Chairman of strategic vision Group “Russia-Islamic World”
- Umakhanov Ilyas – Deputy Chairman of the Council of the Federation of the Federal Assembly of the Russian Federation
- Shaymiev Mintimer - First President of the Republic of Tatarstan, state adviser of the Republic of Tatarstan, UNESCO Special Envoy for strengthening intercultural dialogue
- M. Rifat Hisarjiklioglu, President of the Union of chambers and exchanges of Turkey TOBB
- Ambassador-at-large of the Russian foreign Ministry Konstantin Shuvalov
- H.P. Dato Ku Jafar ku Shaari, General Secretary of the D-8 economic cooperation Organization;
- Dato Seri Mustafa Mohamed, Minister of the International Trade and Industry of Malaysia
- H. P. Datuk Seri Mohd Redzuan Bin MD Yusof, Minister of enterprise development of Malaysia
- Abdelila Belatik, Secretary General of the Council of Islamic banks and financial institutions (CIBAFI)
- Andrew Bryant, Founder of Self Leadership International
- Bello Lawal DANBATTA – General Secretary of Islamic Financial Services Board, Kuala-Lumpur, Malaysia
- Erniyazov Musa- Chairman of the Jokarga Kenes of the Republic of Karakalpakstan
- Yousef al-Usaimin, Deputy Minister of economy of the UAE;
- Ekmeleddin Ihsanoglu, General Secretary of the Organization of Islamic Cooperation;
- Ahmed Mohammed Ali al Madani, ex-president of the Islamic Development Bank;
- Lord Nazir Ahmed, member of the UK House of lords;
- Carlos Bronzatto, General Manager of the World Association of Investment Promotion Agencies;
- Syed Nayar Hussain Bohari, President of the Senate of Pakistan;
- Allal Rashdi, General Director of the Islamic Center for Trade development of the Organization of Islamic Cooperation;
- Mahathir Mohamad, ex-prime Minister of Malaysia and Chairman of the world Alliance for international development partnership;
- Skalar Bostyan - head of the World Association of Investment Development Agencies WAIPA;
- Rashid bin Ahmad bin Fahad - UAE Minister of state for standardization and Metrology;
- Al Khalifa Hamadbin Ibrahim – Representative of the Government of Bahrain, Member of Royal Family;
- Serdar Berdimuhamedov - Chairman of the Committee on legislation and standards of the Mejlis of Turkmenistan;
- Sheih Ahmed Ben Dalmuk Dzhuma Al Maktum – Member of the Royal Family of Emirate Dubai, UAE;
- Sheih Abdulrahman Al Halifa - President of the Supreme Council of Bahrain Kingdom for Islam affairs, Member of the Royal Family
- Sergey Gorkov, Ex-Chairman of Vnesheconombank, General Director –Chairman of the Management Board of “Rosgeologiya”;
- Bogdanov Michail, Special representative of the President of Russia for the Middle East;
- Dosaev Erbolat, Deputy Prime-Minister of the Republic of Kazakhstan;
- Sagintaev Bakytzhan, Chairman of the Directors Board of “Bayterek” Holding;
- Kabaev Marat, President of the International Association of Islamic business;
- Abdulatipov Ramazan, Permanent representative of the Russian Federation to the Organization of Islamic cooperation;

and many others.

== Organization features ==
Summit venue

Since 2019 the Summit is held in the International exhibition center “Kazan Expo”, a world-class complex near the Kazan International airport, a platform for international and interregional communications, site for the transfer of world technology and knowledge.

The complex consists of three exhibition halls connected to the airport and the aeroexpress station by a covered ground crossing.

The infrastructure of “Kazan Expo” includes the modern congress hall for 3 thousand seats, 35 transformer halls with up 30 to 500 people capacity, parking zone and recharge areas. Total area is 75,4 thousand square meters.

Transport for participants

During the Summit for the participants the special transfer from the hotel to the venue, as well as to the airport, is organized.

== Cultural Program ==
=== Excursions ===
There are 3 UNESCO World heritage sites in the Republic of Tatarstan. Participants can visit excursions in the Kazan Kremlin, the ancient city of Bolgar and Island-city Sviyazhsk.

Kazan Kremlin

The Kazan Kremlin is the oldest part of Kazan city, a complex of agricultural, historical and archaeological monuments that reveal the centuries-old history of the city: archaeological remains of the first (XII-XIII centuries), second (XIV-XV centuries) and third hillforts (XV-XVI centuries); white stone Kremlin, a number of temples and buildings of great historical, architectural and cultural venue. Also the official residence of the President of the Republic of Tatarstan is an UNESCO World heritage site since 2000.

Ancient city of Bolgar

Bulgarian settlement of X-XV centuries, a medieval city-a monument of federal significance is located in the Russian Federation, in the Republic of Tatarstan, 200 km from Kazan. The territory includes an archaeological cultural layer of 5 m deep with 7 cultural strata from V century AD to date, representing a valuable archaeological heritage, a number of stone and brick buildings for public and religious purposes preserved from XIII-XIV centuries.

Now it is an important place of pilgrimage for Muslims of Russia. Besides the ancient ruins all that remains of Great Bulgaria is the village of Bolgar and the walls in a large mosque with a XIII-century minaret. Across the road from the entrance to the mosque is the well-preserved Northern Mausoleum. East of the mosque is the Eastern Mausoleum, which was transformed into an Orthodox church in the XVIII century.

Island-city Sviyazhsk

An ancient county town with ancient temples and modern museums, wide open spaces is a place of attraction for tourists from all over the world. The Assumption Cathedral and Monastery of Sviyazhsk were included in the World Heritage List in 2017 by the decision of the 41st session of the UNESCO World Heritage Committee.

=== Modest Fashion Show ===
Since 2017 in the framework of the KazanSummit the Modest Fashion Show is held. Worldwide the concept of “Islamic fashion” is gradually replaced by the concept of “decent fashion” - «modest fashion». It offers clothing more loose, closed style.

5 designers participated in the Kazan Modest Fashion Show 2019: NIKAH CENTER, ARIMAS DRESS, AAM LAURISHA, SHAFIRA, IRD BY INDRIYA R.DANI. 32 brands were represented in the Russia Halal Expo market zone. New contracts to open representative offices of design brands in Kazan from Kyrgyzstan and Turkey were signed.

In 2019, for the first time, the anniversary XV Kazan International Muslim Film festival was held in the Summit. Over 400 films from 44 countries were announced. The geography of the films participating in the festival is vast: European countries (France, Germany, Serbia, Portugal, Iceland, Bosnia and Herzegovina, etc.), Russia, the states of the former USSR (Kazakhstan, Azerbaijan, Kyrgyzstan, Tajikistan, Armenia, etc.), USA, Turkey, Iran, countries of South Asia (Nepal, Afghanistan, Bangladesh), Africa (Kenya, Morocco, Egypt), etc.

The objectives of the festival are the exchange of experience of cultural and art workers of Russia; countries of near and far abroad; showing the creative achievements of filmmakers creating films that popularize universal spiritual, moral and cultural values; creation of objective view of Islam and Muslims in the Russian and world community.

=== Muslim Film Festival ===
In 2019 for the first time the anniversary XV Kazan International Muslim Film Festival was held at the summit. Over 400 films from 44 countries were announced and invited. The geography of the films participating in the festival is vast: European countries (France, Germany, Serbia, Portugal, Iceland, Bosnia and Herzegovina, etc.), Russia, the states of the former USSR (Kazakhstan, Azerbaijan, Kyrgyzstan, Tajikistan, Armenia, etc. ), USA, Turkey, Iran, South Asian countries (Nepal, Afghanistan, Bangladesh), Africa (Kenya, Morocco, Egypt) etc.

The objectives of the festival are: the exchange of experience of cultural and art workers of Russia, countries of near and far abroad; showing the creative achievements of filmmakers creating films that popularize universal spiritual, moral and cultural values; creation of an objective representation in the Russian and world community about Islam and Muslims.
