= Ak Bars Holding =

Diversified holding company based in Kazan, Tatarstan, Russia

- Type: diversified holding company
- Industry: agriculture & agro-industrial, construction, industry, entertainment, catering, food-stuffs, retail
- Founded: 1998; 28 years ago
- Founders: Ak Bars Bank
- Fate: active
- Headquarters: Kazan
- Key people: Ivan Yegorov (CEO), Shamil Gafarov (Chairman)
- Revenue: 85 000 000 000 (2015)
- Net income: 233 mln. RUB (2014)
- Total assets: 3 499 233 559 RUB (2014)
- Number of employees: 20 000 (2017)
- Website: abh.ru

OJSC Ak Bars Holding is a diversified financial holding based in Kazan, Tatarstan, Russia, and established in 1998.

Ak Bars Holding owns stakes in Zelenodolsk Shipyard, and formerly Ak Bars Aero.

The geography of the holding's presence is the nearest cities of Tatarstan: Kazan, Naberezhnye Chelny, Nizhnekamsk, Zelenodolsk, Bugulma, Almetyevsk, Yelabuga, Chistopol, Arsk, as well as the territories of the Agryz, Arsk, Pestrechinsky and Zelenodolsk encirclement.

== See also ==
- Ak Bars Bank
