= UniCredit Bank Russia =

Russian bank

UniCredit Bank

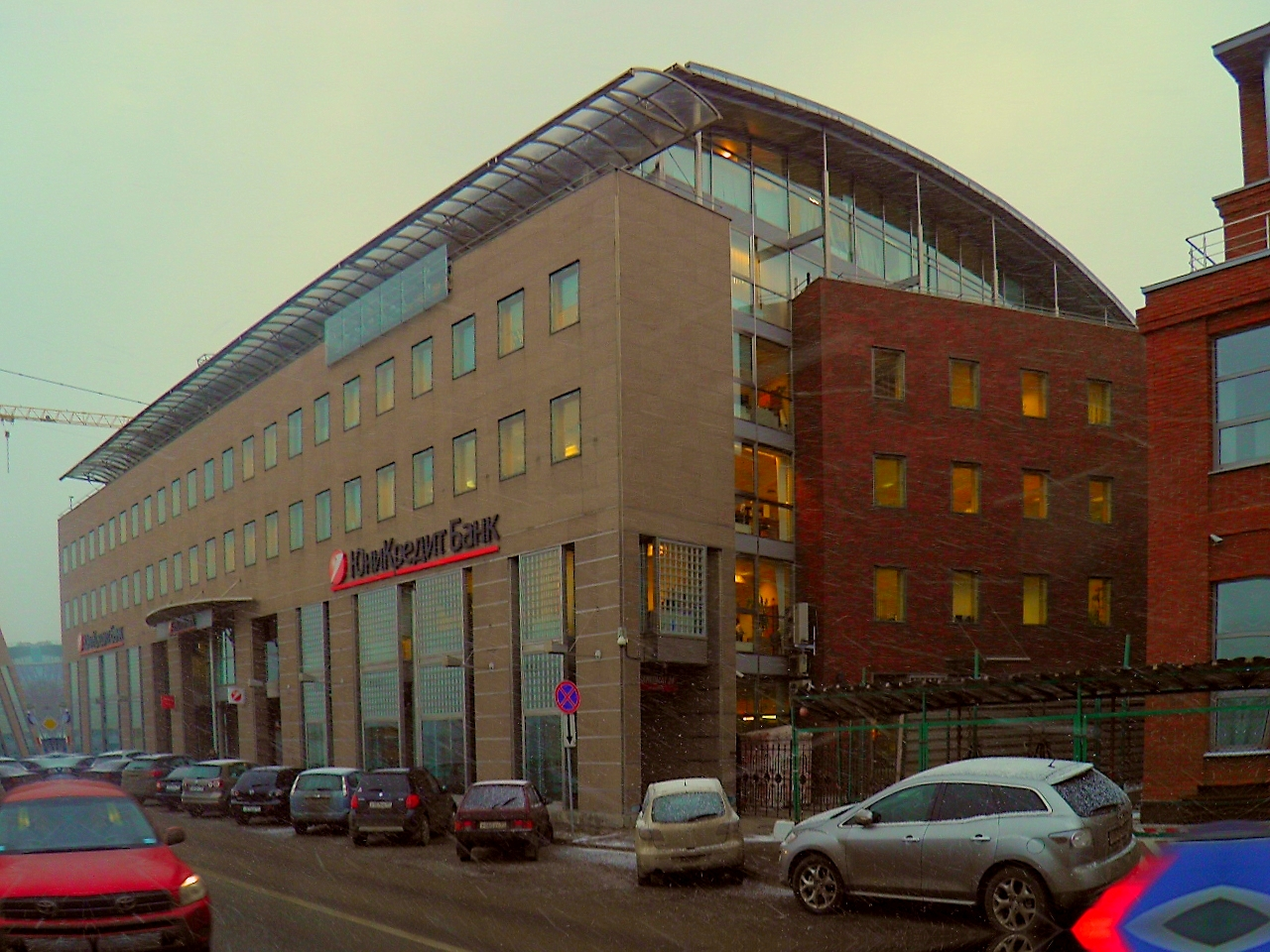
- Head office building in Moscow, 9 Prechistenskaya Embankment, inaugurated in 1995
- Native name: Юникредит банк
- Industry: Financial services
- Founded: 1989
- Headquarters: 9, Prechistenskaya emb., Moscow, 119034, Russian Federation, Moscow, Russia
- Key people: Kirill Zhukov-Emelyanov
- Revenue: 116,225,600,000 Russian ruble (2017)
- Number of employees: 4900
- Parent: Bank Austria
- Rating: BB+ (S&P), BBB− (Fitch) (2017)
- Website: www.unicreditbank.ru

AO UniCredit Bank, known from 1989 to 2007 as the International Moscow Bank (Russian: Международный Московский банк, IMB), is a Russian bank headquartered in Moscow. It is a wholly owned subsidiary of Milan-based UniCredit.

== History ==
International Moscow Bank was founded in October 1989 and capitalized with the hard currency reserves of Vnesheconombank, with the aim that IMB may eventually replace the troubled Vnesheconombank. The founding shareholders were three state-owned Soviet banks together holding 40 percent of total equity (Vnesheconombank for 20 percent, Promstroybank for 10 percent, and Sberbank for 10 percent), and five international banks together holding 60 percent (Bayerische Vereinsbank, Creditanstalt-Bankverein, Banca Commerciale Italiana, Credit Lyonnais, and Kansallis-Osake-Pankki). As such, IMB was the first majority-foreign-owned bank in the Soviet Union.

In the 1990s and early 2000s, IMB developed lending and banking services first to larger Russian companies, then to smaller firms and retail clients.

In 2001, IMB merged with the Russian subsidiary of Bank Austria. By 2006, HypoVereinsbank (HVB, by then controlled by UniCredit) held around 53 percent of IMB's equity, the rest being shared between Nordea (26 percent), BCEN-Eurobank (16 percent), and the European Bank for Reconstruction and Development (EBRD, 5 percent). The next year, after a series of transactions, HVB's subsidiary Bank Austria secured full ownership of IMB by acquiring the EBRD's remaining equity stake. Bank Austria remained as the direct parent company of the Russian bank until September 2016, when the stake was transferred to direct ownership by UniCredit.

In May 2013, the bank merged its own ATM network with the Raiffeisenbank ATM network.

In 2014, the bank was registered as AO UniCredit Bank.

In March 2019, UniCredit Bank topped the list of the most reliable banks in Russia according to Forbes experts, ahead of 99 other banks, including Raiffeisenbank.

== Operations ==
AO UniCredit Bank has a general banking license No. 1. The bank specializes in servicing corporate and private clients, corporate finance and treasury operations. The main focus is on lending to small and medium-sized enterprises; the retail services sector is developing less actively. As of the spring of 2011, the bank had 106 branches in Russia and a representative office in Belarus, over 985 thousand individual clients and more than 22.6 thousand corporate clients.

=== Performance indicators ===
In 2010, the bank's share in the Russian lending market was 2.18%, in the deposit market – 1.36%. The number of personnel in the spring of 2011 is 3.7 thousand people. Financial indicators of the bank as of December 31, 2011, following the results of 2011 in accordance with International Financial Reporting Standards (IFRS).

== See also ==
- Raiffeisenbank (Russia)
