= Big Four (banking) =

Term for large banks; referred varies by country

The Big Four (or Big 4) is the colloquial name given to the four main banks in several countries where the banking industry is dominated by just four institutions and where the phrase has thus gained relevance. Some countries include more or fewer institutions in such rankings, leading to other names such as Big Three, Big Five, or Big Six.

== International use ==
Internationally, the term "Big Four Banks" has traditionally referred to the following central banks:

| Official name | Purview | Short-form name | Year of inception |
|---|---|---|---|
| Bank of England | United Kingdom | BOE | 1694 |
| Federal Reserve | United States | The Fed | 1913 |
| Bank of Japan | Japan | BOJ | 1882 |
| European Central Bank | European Union | ECB | 1998 |

== Australia ==
In Australia, the "big four banks" refers to the four largest banks that have historically dominated Australia's banking industry in terms of market share, revenue, and total assets. The "big four banks" of Australia are:

| Official name | Short-form name | Year of inception |
|---|---|---|
| ANZ Bank | ANZ | 1835 |
| Commonwealth Bank | CommBank or CBA | 1911 |
| National Australia Bank | NAB | 1858 |
| Westpac | WBC | 1817 |

== Austria ==
The "Big Four" banks of Austria are:

- Erste Group
- Bank Austria
- Austrian Raiffeisen Banking Group
- BAWAG PSK (formerly Österreichische Postsparkasse)

== Belgium ==
The big four banks of Belgium are a result of national and international mergers in the early 90s.

- KBC Group, including its CBC Banque subsidiary in the French Community of Belgium and KBC Brussels brand in the Brussels-Capital Region
- Belfius, government-owned bank
- BNP Paribas Fortis, subsidiary of BNP Paribas
- ING Group

== Brazil ==
According to S&P Global in 2024, the "Big Five" banks in Brazil (which are also the 5 largest banks in Latin America):

| Rank | Bank | Ownership | Total assets (USD B) | Year of incorporation |
|---|---|---|---|---|
| 1 | Itaú Unibanco | Private bank | 555.72 | 2008 (merger of Itaú and Unibanco; Itaú founded in 1945) |
| 2 | Banco do Brasil | Public bank | 447.72 | 1808 |
| 3 | Banco Bradesco | Private bank | 394.76 | 1943 |
| 4 | Caixa Econômica Federal | Public bank | 377.29 | 1861 |
| 5 | Santander Brasil | Private bank | 237.66 | 1982 |

== Cambodia ==
According to the National Bank of Cambodia, the top three largest banks in Cambodia dominates 39.1% (The largest bank in term of total asset is Canadia Bank at 14.2%, followed by ACLEDA Bank at 12.7%, in third place Advanced Bank of Asia (ABA) at 12.2%) of the overall banking assets as of 2020. These banks are:

- Canadia Bank
- ACLEDA Bank
- Advanced Bank of Asia

== Canada ==
There are six banks dominating the Canadian banking sector. Five of these six banks make up what is known as the "Big Five".

| Official name | Short-form name | Year of inception |
|---|---|---|
| Royal Bank of Canada | RBC | 1864 |
| Toronto-Dominion Bank | TD | 1955 |
| Scotiabank | BNS | 1832 |
| Bank of Montreal | BMO | 1817 |
| Canadian Imperial Bank of Commerce | CIBC | 1961 |
| National Bank of Canada | NBC | 1928 |

== China ==
In the People's Republic of China, the "Big Four" banks (四大银行) are:

| Official name | Short-form name | Chinese name | Year of inception |
|---|---|---|---|
| Industrial and Commercial Bank of China | ICBC | 中国工商银行 | 1984 |
| Bank of China | BOC | 中国银行 | 1912 |
| China Construction Bank | CCB | 中国建设银行 | 1954 |
| Agricultural Bank of China | ABC / AgBank | 中国农业银行 | 1951 |

== Colombia ==
According to reports from 2025, only 4 banks surpass the 100 trillion Colombian peso gap, They account about 65% of all assets.

| Name | Ownership | Branches | Total assets in COP billions (USD billions) | |
|---|---|---|---|---|
| Bancolombia | Private bank | 650 | 264 790 | (73,38) |
| Davivienda | Private bank | 663 | 224 497 | (62,03) |
| Banco de Bogotá | Private bank | 422 | 156 164 | (43,15) |
| BBVA Colombia | Private bank | 379 | 110 164 | (30,50) |

== Czech Republic ==
In Czech Republic, the "big three" are:

- Česká spořitelna, subsidiary of Erste Group
- Československá obchodní banka, subsidiary of KBC Bank
- Komerční banka, subsidiary of Société Générale (formerly part of State Bank of Czechoslovakia)

== Egypt ==
As of 2025 data, big five dominant banks are:

| Name | Ownership | Branches | Total assets (USD billions) |
|---|---|---|---|
| National Bank of Egypt | Public bank | 679 | (156 89) |
| Banque Misr | Public bank | 820 | (78) |
| Commercial International Bank | Private bank | 214 | (23,4) |
| Arab African Internatıonal Bank | Joint-stock company | 99 | (18,2) |
| QNB Egypt | Private bank | 239 | (17,9) |

== Estonia ==
- LHV
- Luminor
- SEB
- Swedbank Estonia

== Finland ==
- Danske Bank
- Nordea
- OP
- Säästöpankkiryhmä

== France ==
According to S&P Global in 2024, the 'Big Six' major banking groups in France are:

| Bank | Assets (EUR billion) | Year of incorporation |
|---|---|---|
| BNP Paribas | 2,594.14 | 2000 |
| Crédit Agricole | 2,476.43 | 1894 |
| Société Générale | 1,553.81 | 1864 |
| BPCE Group | 1,544.14 | 2009 |
| Crédit Mutuel | 1,142.19 | 1882 |
| La Banque postale | 738.15 | 2006 |

== Germany ==
- Deutsche Bank
- DZ Bank
- KfW
- Commerzbank

== Greece ==
- Alpha Bank
- Eurobank
- National Bank of Greece
- Piraeus Bank

== Hong Kong ==
| Bank | Chinese name | Year of incorporation |
|---|---|---|
| HSBC (Hong Kong) | 香港上海滙豐銀行 | 1865 |
| Bank of China (Hong Kong) | 中國銀行(香港) | 2001 |
| Standard Chartered Bank (Hong Kong) | 渣打銀行(香港) | 1859 |
| Hang Seng Bank | 恒生銀行 | 1933 |

HSBC Hong Kong, Standard Chartered Bank (Hong Kong), and Bank of China (Hong Kong) are the three note-issuing banks; Hang Seng and HSBC Hong Kong are both under the common ownership of London-based HSBC Holdings plc. According to Global Retail Banking Cross-sell conducted by RFi group in 2015, HSBC, Bank of China (Hong Kong), and Hang Seng Bank were the top 3 most popular banks in Hong Kong.

== India ==
In India the largest banks, based on total market capitalization, are:

Big Four private banks in India

- HDFC Bank
- ICICI Bank
- Kotak Mahindra Bank
- Axis Bank

Big Four public sector banks in India

- State Bank of India
- Punjab National Bank
- Bank of Baroda
- Canara Bank

== Indonesia ==
In Indonesia, the four largest banks by total assets, revenue, and market capitalization consist of 3 government-owned banks and 1 private bank. As of 2025, the four largest banks by market capitalization are:

| Official name | Short-form name | Year of inception |
|---|---|---|
| Bank Central Asia | BCA | 1957 |
| Bank Rakyat Indonesia | BRI | 1895 |
| Bank Mandiri | BMRI | 1998 |
| Bank Negara Indonesia | BNI | 1946 |

BRI, Bank Mandiri, and BNI are all controlled by the central government as state-owned enterprises as a part of Danantara Indonesia.

== Ireland ==
In Ireland, the term "big four" applies to the four largest banks by market capitalisation.

- Bank of Ireland
- Allied Irish Banks
- Permanent TSB
- Ulster Bank – a wholly owned subsidiary of NatWest Group, which withdrew from the Republic of Ireland market in 2023.

== Israel ==
In Israel, the term "big five" is used instead of "big four".

| Bank | Hebrew name | Year of incorporation |
|---|---|---|
| Bank Leumi | בנק לאומי | 1902 |
| Bank Hapoalim | בנק הפועלים | 1921 |
| Israel Discount Bank | בנק דיסקונט לישראל | 1935 |
| Bank Mizrahi-Tefahot | בנק מזרחי טפחות | 1923 |
| First International Bank of Israel | הבנק הבינלאומי | 1970 |

== Italy ==
According to S&P Global in 2024, the 'Big Five' major banking groups in Italy are:

| Bank | Assets (EUR billion) | Year of incorporation |
|---|---|---|
| Intesa Sanpaolo | 965.13 | 2007 |
| UniCredit | 789.24 | 1998 |
| Banco BPM | 202.13 | 2017 |
| BPER Banca | 142.13 | 1867 |
| Banca Monte dei Paschi di Siena | 122.61 | 1472 |

== Japan ==
In Japan, the term "big three" is used instead of "big four". The related term city bank is also sometimes used for these banks. The "big three" are:

| Financial group | Bank | Japanese name | Year of incorporation |
|---|---|---|---|
| Mitsubishi UFJ Financial Group | MUFG Bank | 三菱UFJ銀行 | 2005 |
| Sumitomo Mitsui Financial Group | Sumitomo Mitsui Banking Corporation (SMBC) | 三井住友銀行 | 2002 |
| Mizuho Financial Group | Mizuho Bank | みずほ銀行 | 2000 |

These banks are all listed in the Tokyo Stock Exchange (where they are constituents of the Nikkei 225 and TOPIX Core30 indices) and the New York Stock Exchange in the form of American depositary receipts; MUFG and SMBC Group are both additionally listed in the Nagoya Stock Exchange and serve as the financial arms of their respective namesake keiretsu (Mitsubishi for MUFG, Sumitomo and Mitsui for SMBC).

== Kenya ==
- KCB Bank Kenya Limited
- Equity Bank
- Co-operative Bank
- NCBA Group

== Latvia ==
According to a consumer survey conducted in 2019, the "big four" retail banks in Latvia are:

- Swedbank
- SEB
- Citadele
- Luminor

== Lebanon ==
In Lebanon, where the banks have retained their banking secrecy laws since 1956, which is prevalent in the whole MENA region, and while adopting international measures to fight money laundering, the "big four" banks consist of:

- Bank Audi (founded in 1830 and ranked on the Forbes Magazine Global 2000 list of largest public companies in the world in 2016)
- Byblos Bank (founded in 1950 as "Société Commerciale et Agricole Byblos Bassil Frères & Co.")
- BLOM Bank: Banque du Liban et d'Outre-Mer S.A.L (founded in 1951)
- Fransabank (founded in 1921 as Société Centrale de Banque)

Furthermore, as of September 2016, there are more than 51 banks in Lebanon, one of the smallest countries in the Middle East, a fact that has always made investors from the Arab countries, especially the GCC petrodollar in addition to the European and world investors, to place their funds in the Lebanese banks.

== Luxembourg ==
The "big four" full-service banks in Luxembourg are:

- Banque et Caisse d'Épargne de l'État (Spuerkeess), state owned bank
- Banque Internationale à Luxembourg,
- BGL BNP Paribas
- ING Luxembourg

There are bigger banks in Luxembourg, but these only deliver a limited number of services such as investment banking, private banking, or corporate banking only. Luxembourg is a financial center.

== Macau ==
In Macau, the four major banks are:

- Bank of China, Macau Branch
- Industrial and Commercial Bank of China (Macau)
- Tai Fung Bank
- Luso International Banking

== Malaysia ==
According to Central Bank of Malaysia (BNM), the 5 largest Malaysian banks by assets size are:

| Bank name | Year of inception |
|---|---|
| Maybank | 1960 |
| CIMB | 2006 |
| Public Bank | 1966 |
| RHB Bank | 1997 |
| Hong Leong Bank | 1965 |

== Mexico ==
According to S&P Global in 2024, the "Big Four" banks in Mexico (which are within the 10 largest banks in Latin America):

| Bank | Total assets (USD B) | Ownership | Year of incorporation |
|---|---|---|---|
| BBVA México | 197.29 | Private (Foreign-owned) | 1932 |
| Banorte | 134.56 | Private bank | 1899 |
| Santander México | 108.40 | Private (Foreign-owned) | 1932 (as Banco Mexicano) / 1997 (became part of Santander) |
| Banamex | 93.92 | Private bank | 1884 |

== Myanmar ==
According to Asia Times, the four largest banks in Myanmar are:

- Kanbawza Bank
- Ayeyarwady Bank
- CB Bank
- Yoma Bank

== Netherlands ==
The "big four" banks in the Netherlands by market concentration are:

| Official name | Year of inception |
|---|---|
| ING Group | 1991 |
| Rabobank | 1898 |
| ABN AMRO | 1991 |
| de Volksbank | 1817 |

The market leader for the Netherlands, ING Group, is one of the world's largest multinational banking and financial service corporations, with products and services reaching over 41 countries worldwide.

== New Zealand ==
New Zealand is Australia's closest neighbour, with very close cultural and economic ties. The big four Australian banks (often referred to collectively as the "big banks" or the "big Aussie banks") also dominate the banking sector in New Zealand, through subsidiaries:

- ANZ Bank New Zealand (ANZ), a subsidiary of Australia and New Zealand Banking Group
- ASB Bank (ASB), formerly Auckland Savings Bank, a subsidiary of Commonwealth Bank of Australia
- Bank of New Zealand (BNZ), a subsidiary of the National Australia Bank
- Westpac New Zealand (WBC), formerly WestpacTrust, after a merger with Trust Bank, a subsidiary of Westpac Banking Corporation

Together they hold over 90% of gross loans and advances in New Zealand as well as close to 90% of all mortgages.

These four NZ subsidiaries are massively profitable and sometimes even outperform the Australian parent companies. The extent to which they dominate the banking sector can be seen in profits: In the 2012/2013 financial year, the largest of the Big Banks, ANZ New Zealand, made a profit of NZ$1.37 billion. The smallest, BNZ, made a profit of NZ$695 million. State-owned Kiwibank, community trust-owned TSB Bank, SBS Bank (formerly Southland Building Society) and Heartland Bank, the next four largest banks by profit, made NZ$97 million, NZ$73.5 million, NZ$14 million and NZ$7 million (albeit with an underlying result of about NZ$30 million) respectively. Thus, the profit of New Zealand's next four largest banks (after the Big Four) is equal to less than 30% of the smallest of the Big Four, BNZ.

== Nigeria ==
The term "Big Five" is used instead of four, with five banks dominating the Nigerian banking world. As of 2025 data:

| Name | Ownership | Branches | Total assets (USD billions) |
|---|---|---|---|
| Access Bank Group | Private bank | 940 | (30,42) |
| United Bank for Africa | Private bank | 738 | (22,57) |
| Zenith Bank | Private bank | 500 | (22,31) |
| First Bank of Nigeria | Private bank | 820 | (20,26) |
| GTCO Group | Private bank | 350 | (13,23) |

== North Macedonia ==
According to PricewaterhouseCoopers, the three largest banks in North Macedonia dominate 60% of the banking market share.

- Komercijalna banka Skopje
- Stopanska Banka
- NLB Tutunska

== Pakistan ==
In Pakistan, six banks have a market cap of more than $1 billion, three of which are designated by the State Bank of Pakistan as Domestic Systemically Important Banks (D-SIBs)

| Bank | Market Cap (as of October 2025 in PKR bn) | Year of Incorporation | D-SIB? |
|---|---|---|---|
| United Bank Limited | 1011 | 1959 | Yes |
| Meezan Bank | 827 | 1997 | No |
| Bank Alfalah | 170 | 1997 | No |
| National Bank of Pakistan | 461 | 1949 | Yes |
| Habib Bank | 441 | 1941 | Yes |
| MCB Bank | 433 | 1947 | No |

== Panama ==
- Banco General
- Banistmo
- Banco Nacional
- BAC Credomatic

== Peru ==
In Peru the "big four" are:

- Banco de Crédito del Perú
- BBVA Perú
- Scotiabank (a subsidiary of the Canadian bank)
- Interbank

== Philippines ==
The term "Big Four" is not explicitly used in the Philippines. The following are the four largest banks in the country in terms of total assets as of December 2024:

- Banco de Oro
- Land Bank of the Philippines
- Bank of the Philippine Islands
- Metrobank

== Poland ==
Based on market capitalization, assets, and systemic importance, the "Big Four" banks in Poland as of 2025–2026 are generally recognized as.

- PKO Bank Polski (PKO BP): The largest bank in Poland, which is partially state-owned and holds a dominant market share (approx. 15.70% as of late 2024).
- Bank Pekao (Polska Kasa Opieki): Often ranked second behind PKO BP, it is a significant player with a high level of state ownership through PZU and PFR. One of the two banks which is allowed to trade Polish treasury bonds, with the former being PKO BP.
- Erste Bank Polska: One of the most profitable foreign-owned networks, which has maintained a strong position in the Polish market. Formerly Santander Bank Polska, the Austrian Erste Group took over in 2026.
- ING Bank Śląski: A major player in the Polish banking sector. Owned by the Dutch ING Groep, it remains a stronghold in the commercial and personal banking sectors. Headquartered in Katowice, it inherits a large percentage of the marketshare of former Bank Śląski (Silesian Bank), which ING inherited. Large consumer base in south and southwestern Poland and in all of Silesia.

== Romania ==
The Romanian banking system has almost 40 banks, most detained by local financial vehicles and some subsidiaries of foreign banks. The big four are as follows.

- Banca Comercială Română, now part of the Erste Group
- Banca Transilvania, the biggest bank detained by private investors with domestic capital
- BRD – Groupe Société Générale, formerly known as Romanian Bank for Development
- CEC Bank, the state-owned bank, formerly known as Casa de Economii și Consemnațiuni

Other major banks are Raiffeisen Bank, Unicredit Bank, and the ING Bank of Holland subsidiary.

== Russia ==
The largest banks by operations and assets in Russia:

| Bank | Russian name | Year of incorporation |
|---|---|---|
| Sberbank | Сбербанк | 1991 |
| VTB Bank | Банк ВТБ | 1990 |
| Alfa-Bank | Альфа-Банк | 1990 |
| T-Bank | Т-Банк | 2006 |
| Russian Agricultural Bank (Rosselkhozbank) | Россельхозбанк | 2000 |
| Gazprombank | Газпромбанк | 1990 |

== Saudi Arabia ==
In Saudi Arabia, the "Big Five" are:

| Official name | Arabic name | Year of inception |
|---|---|---|
| Saudi National Bank | البنك الوطني السعودي | 1953 |
| Al Rajhi Bank | مصرف الراجحي | 1957 |
| Riyad Bank | بنك الرياض | 1957 |
| Saudi Awwal Bank | البنك السعودي الأول | 1978 |
| Banque Saudi Fransi | بنك سعودي فرنسي | 1977 |

== Singapore ==
According to S&P Global in 2024, the "Big Three" banks in Singapore are:

| Bank | Assets (USD billion) | Subsidiary bank | Year of incorporation |
|---|---|---|---|
| DBS Bank | 461.0 | POSB Bank | 1968 (DBS), 1877 (POSB) |
| OCBC Bank | 435.1 | Bank of Singapore | 1932 |
| United Overseas Bank | 396.4 | | 1935 |

== South Africa ==
In South Africa, the "big four", These are banks with assets exceeding 100 billion, and they have operations in other African countries. As of 2025 data:

| Name | Ownership | Branches | Total assets (USD billions) |
|---|---|---|---|
| Standard Bank | Private bank | 720 | (220,6) |
| FirstRand | Private bank | 767 | (164,1) |
| Absa Bank | Private bank | 1035 | (137,2) |
| Nedbank | Private bank | 546 | (100,1) |

== South Korea ==
In South Korea, the "Big Eight" are:

| Financial group | Bank | Korean name | Year of inception |
|---|---|---|---|
| KB Financial Group | Kookmin Bank (KB) | 국민은행 | 1963 |
| Shinhan Financial Group | Shinhan Bank | 신한은행 | 1982 |
| Hana Financial Group | Hana Bank | 하나은행 | 1967 |
| Woori Financial Group | Woori Bank | 우리은행 | 2002 |
| Industrial Bank of Korea | (IBK) | 기업은행 | 1961 |
| Nonghyup Bank | (NH Bank) | NH농협은행 | 2012 |
| BNK Financial Group | Busan Bank | 부산은행 | 1967 |
| IM Financial Group | Daegu Bank | 대구은행 | 2012 |

== Spain ==
As of September 2021, the "big four" in Spain are:

| Official name | Short-form name | Year of inception |
|---|---|---|
| Banco Santander | Santander | 1857 |
| Banco Bilbao Vizcaya Argentaria | BBVA | 1857 |
| Caixabank | Caixabank | 2011 |
| Banco Sabadell | Sabadell | 1881 |

== Sri Lanka ==
In Sri Lanka, the leading banks are, as of 2020

State-owned banks

- Bank of Ceylon
- National Savings Bank
- People's Bank

Privately owned banks

- Commercial Bank of Ceylon PLC
- Sampath Bank PLC
- Hatton National Bank PLC
- National Development Bank PLC

Leading foreign-owned banks

- HSBC Sri Lanka
- Standard Chartered Bank Sri Lanka
- State Bank of India, Sri Lanka

== Sweden ==
In Sweden the "big four" are:

- Svenska Handelsbanken
- Skandinaviska Enskilda Banken
- Swedbank
- Nordea

== Switzerland ==
In Switzerland, the Big Four are as follows:

| Official name | Year of inception |
|---|---|
| UBS | 1998 |
| Raiffeisen Bank | 1899 |
| Zurich Cantonal Bank (ZKB) | 1870 |
| PostFinance | 1906 |

== Taiwan ==
In Taiwan, the seven "systemic banks" are:

| Bank | Chinese name | Year of incorporation |
|---|---|---|
| CTBC Bank | 中國信託商業銀行 | 1966 |
| Bank of Taiwan | 臺灣銀行 | 1946 |
| Mega International Commercial Bank | 兆豐國際商業銀行 | 1992 |
| Taipei Fubon Bank | 台北富邦銀行 | 1963 |
| Taiwan Cooperative Bank | 臺灣合作金庫銀行 | 1923 |
| First Commercial Bank | 第一商業銀行 | 1899 |
| Cathay United Bank | 國泰世華商業銀行 | 1975 |

== Thailand ==
The "Big Six" banks in Thailand are as follows:

| Bank | Acronym | Thai name | Year of incorporation |
|---|---|---|---|
| Siam Commercial Bank | SCB | ธนาคารไทยพาณิชย์ | 1906 |
| Kasikornbank | KBank | ธนาคารกสิกรไทย | 1945 |
| Krungthai Bank | KTB | ธนาคารกรุงไทย | 1966 |
| Bangkok Bank | BBL | ธนาคารกรุงเทพ | 1944 |
| TMBThanachart Bank | TTB | ธนาคารทหารไทยธนชาต | 1957 |
| Bank of Ayudhya (Krungsri) | BAY | ธนาคารกรุงศรีอยุธยา | 1945 |

Before the Siamese Revolution, the banking system was controlled by foreign powers, particularly the "big four" European banks.

- The Hongkong and Shanghai Bank in 1888 (Now HSBC)
- The Chartered Bank of India, Australia and China in 1894 (Now Standard Chartered Bank Thailand)
- Banque de l'Indochine in 1897 (Now Banque Calyon, a subsidiary of Crédit Agricole)
- Mercantile Bank of India in 1923 (Now Citibank Thailand, a subsidiary of Citigroup)

== Turkey ==
In 2021, the top three largest state-owned banks held over 37.1% of the market share, while Turkey's top four largest foreign-owned banks dominate 22.9% of the overall market share.

=== State-owned banks ===
- Ziraat Bank
- Halkbank
- VakıfBank

=== Privately-owned banks ===
- Garanti BBVA
- Akbank
- Yapı Kredi
- Türkiye İş Bankası
- Fibabanka

== United Arab Emirates ==
Based on the total assets of listed banks at the end of 2017, big five banks in United Arab Emirates are:

- First Abu Dhabi Bank
- Emirates NBD
- Abu Dhabi Commercial Bank
- Dubai Islamic Bank
- Mashreq

== United Kingdom ==
=== England and Wales and UK as a whole ===
In relation to England and Wales and the United Kingdom as a whole, the phrase "big four" is used to refer to the four largest High Street retail banking groups:

| Official name | Year of inception |
|---|---|
| HSBC UK | 1865 |
| Barclays UK | 1690 |
| Lloyds Bank | 1765 |
| NatWest | 1658 |

=== Scotland ===
In relation to Scotland, the phrase "big four" is used to refer to the four largest banking groups:

- Royal Bank of Scotland (NatWest Group)
- Bank of Scotland (Lloyds Banking Group)
- Clydesdale Bank (trading as Virgin Money UK)
- TSB Bank (Santander UK)

=== Northern Ireland ===
In relation to Northern Ireland, the phrase "big four" is used to refer to the four largest banking groups:

- Bank of Ireland
- Ulster Bank (NatWest Group)
- Northern Bank (trading as Danske Bank)
- Allied Irish Banks

=== Historical use ===
Until 1970, the phrase "big five" (as opposed to "little six") was used to refer to the five largest UK clearing banks (institutions which clear bankers' cheques), which in England and Wales were:

- Barclays Bank;
- Midland Bank (now HSBC UK Bank and part of HSBC Holdings);
- Lloyds Bank (now part of Lloyds Banking Group);
- National Provincial Bank; and
- Westminster Bank

After the merger of Westminster Bank, National Provincial Bank and District Bank to form National Westminster Bank (now part of NatWest Group) in 1970, the term "big four" came into use instead.

== United States ==
In the United States, the "big four" banks are below, in order of size:

| Name | Headquartered in | Chartered in |
|---|---|---|
| JPMorgan Chase | New York City | Columbus, Ohio |
| Bank of America | Charlotte, North Carolina | |
| Citigroup | New York City | Sioux Falls, South Dakota |
| Wells Fargo | San Francisco | Sioux Falls, South Dakota |

Regardless of the jurisdiction of charter, all these banks are legally subsidiaries of Delaware-chartered bank holding companies.

== Vietnam ==
In Vietnam, the four major banking groups are:

- Vietcombank
- Agribank
- BIDV
- Vietinbank

As of the start of 2024, the big four held VNĐ13.5 quadrillion worth of public deposits (bank liabilities), equivalent to 50% of all bank deposits nationwide. Meanwhile, during the annual year 2023, these banks represented 42% of the outstanding loans (bank credit) that were issued over this period nationwide, a total of VNĐ685 trillion.

== See also ==
- Big Four accounting firms
- Big Oil
- Big Soda
- Big Tech
- Big Three (automobile manufacturers)
- Big Three (management consultancies)
- Big Tobacco
