= COLCAP =

Stock market index of Columbia

COLCAP is the main stock market index of the Colombia Stock Exchange since November 2013 when it replaced IGBC as the leading index for Colombia. It consists of the 20 most actively traded shares of the market. The adjusted market capitalization for each company listed on the COLCAP is reviewed periodically to determine its inclusion in the index.

The COLCAP index was inaugurated on January 5, 2008 with an initial value of 1,000.

== Components ==
The COLCAP Index consists of the following 20 major Colombian companies:

Company	Exchange	Symbol	Industry
Banco de Bogotá	BVC	BVC: BOGOTA	Banking
Bancolombia	BVC; NYSE	BVC: BCOLOMBIA; BVC: PFBCOLOMB; NYSE: CIB	Banking
Canacol Energy	BVC; TSX	BVC: CNEC; TSX: CNE	Oil and Gas
Celsia	BVC	BVC: CELSIA	Energy
Cementos Argos	BVC	BVC: CEMARGOS; BVC: PFCEMARGOS	Building Materials
Colombia Stock Exchange	BVC	BVC: BVC	Stock Exchanges
Corficolombiana	BVC	BVC: CORFICOLCF; BVC: PFCORFICOL	Financial services
Davivienda	BVC	BVC: PFDAVVNDA	Banking
Ecopetrol	BVC; NYSE; TSX; FWB	BVC: ECOPETROL; NYSE: EC; TSX: ECP; FWB: ECHA	Oil and Gas
Grupo Energía Bogotá	BVC	BVC: EEB	Energy
Grupo Argos	BVC	BVC: GRUPOARGOS; BVC: PFGRUPOARG	Conglomerate
Grupo Aval	BVC; NYSE	BVC: GRUPOAVAL; BVC: PFAVAL; NYSE: AVAL	Bank Holding
Grupo Nutresa	BVC	BVC: NUTRESA	Food industry
Grupo Sura	BVC	BVC: GRUPOSURA; BVC: PFGRUPSURA	Conglomerate
Grupo Bolivar	BVC	BVC: BOLIVAR	Conglomerate
Interconexión Eléctrica	BVC	BVC: ISA	Energy
Terpel	BVC	BVC: TERPEL	Gasoline pump
ETB	BVC	BVC: ETB	Telecommunications
Mineros	BVC	BVC: MINEROS	Mineral processing
Promigas	BVC	BVC: PROMIGAS	Natural gas

== See also ==
- Colombia Stock Exchange
- IGBC
