= Grupo Empresarial Antioqueño =

The Grupo Empresarial Antioqueño (GEA, Business Group of Antioquia) also known as Sindicato Antioqueño, is a Colombian conglomerate composed by around 125 companies, most of them based in Antioquia Department.

Though, legally speaking, such an entity does not exist, it is commonly regarded as the first Colombian keiretsu. It is "controlled" by four main companies: Bancolombia (banking), Grupo Argos (cement, power & infrastructure), Grupo Sura (insurance, financial), and Grupo Nutresa (processed food). The group, through these companies, has 10,000 shareholders. GEA's 2007 income amounts to 5.5% of Colombia's gross domestic product.

On January 15, 2023, the Financial Times reported: 'Regulators are investigating whether the GEA is acting as an “economic group”.'

== Companies ==
- Bancolombia
- Inversiones Nutresa

- Nutresa
- Compañía Nacional de Chocolates
- Compañía Nacional De Chocolates de Perú S.A.
- Compañía de Galletas Noel
- Compañía de Galletas Pozuelo D.C.R.
- Industrias de Alimentos Zenú
- Dulces de Colombia
- Colcafé
- Meals de Colombia
- Pastas Doria
- Rica Rondo
- Frigorífico Suizo
- La Bastilla
- Hermo de Venezuela
- Frigorífico Continental
- Tecniagro
- Comarrico

- Fabricato
- Inversiones Argos
  - Cementos Argos
  - Cementos Colón
  - Corp. Incem
  - Port Royal
  - CINA
  - Savannah Cement
  - Southern Star Concrete, Inc.
  - Concrete Express
  - Ready Mixed Concrete
  - Celsia
- Grupo Sura
  - Seguros SURA formerly Compañía Suramericana de Seguros
  - Compañía Suramericana de Seguros de Vida
  - Interoceánica de Seguros
  - EPS SURA formerly Susalud
  - ARP SURA formerly Suratep
  - Seriauto
  - Administradora de Fondos de Inversión Suramericana
  - Gerencia Prestación servicios de Salud
  - IPS Punto de Salud, IPS Punto de Vista, AVANCE, Salud en Casa
  - Compañía Suramericana de Capitalización
  - Centro para los Trabajadores CPT
  - Interoceanica de seguros
  - Tipiel S.A.
- Internacional Ejecutiva de Aviación

=== Former subsidiaries ===
- Almacenes Éxito
