= Chocopunch =

Peruvian retail confection product

- Product type: Chocolate cream confection
- Current owner: Compañía Nacional de Chocolates de Perú S.A.
- Country: Peru
- Introduced: 1993
- Markets: Peru
- Previous owners: Good Foods Peru SA.
- Website: www.chocolates.com.pe

Chocopunch is a popular name-brand retail confection product made in Peru under the Winter's brand owned by Compañía Nacional de Chocolates de Perú S.A. The Chocopunch brand was registered in Peru in 1995 and started production in 1997 by Lima-based Good Foods S.A. which was purchased on February 1, 2007 by Colombia-based Grupo Nacional de Chocolates through its Peruvian subsidiary Compañía Nacional de Chocolates de Perú S.A. . Compañía Nacional de Chocolates de Perú S.A. received a Class 30 (staple foods) international trademark registration for "Chocopunch" on December 17, 2007.

== Marketing ==
The slogan for Chocopunch, targeting juveniles, is "Chocopunch! Punch! Punch!" (which has the same meaning in both Spanish and English). The name Chocopunch has a double meaning in Spanish, choco is short for chocolate, of course, but the word chocó means "surprise" or "shock," a powerful word in advertising. A key promotional aspect of Chocopunch over the years has been, packaged with the product, colorful plastic cucharitas (mini spoons), in the shapes of different characters from movies, television, and video games, that are collected like prizes. Several licensed series of mini spoons have been introduced including: Bakugan Battle Brawlers (2011), Barney (TV), Choko (Winter's brand cartoon character), Digimon, Dinos (2003), Dragon Ball, Dragon Ball Z, Dragon Ball Z second series (2011), two different series of El Chavo (TV), Garfield, La Era de Hielo 3 (2009, Ice Age 3, film), Looney Tunes, The Mask (film), Patacloun, Pokémon, Popeye (1992–93), Power Rangers, Rugrats, Spider-Man 3 (film), SpongeBob SquarePants, Los Caballeros del Zodiaco (Saint Seiya), Star Wars (film), Tengo 2, and Tom and Jerry.

== Products ==
- Chocopunch Chocolatissimo - A cream confection with three flavors (chocolate, hazelnut and toffee) combined in one 15 gram container. Packaged with Chocopunch are cucharitas (mini spoons) in the shape of the chocolate drop character "Choko". The injection molded mini spoons come in six different shapes and five different colors, with a total of 30 different items in the collection.
- Chocopunch El Chavo - A cream confection with two flavors (chocolate and vanilla) combined in one 17 gram container. Packaged with Chocopunch El Chavo are mini spoons in the shape of characters from the syndicated cartoon television series El Chavo del Ocho. The injection molded plastic mini spoons come in 12 different shapes and five different colors, with a total of 60 different items in the collection. This product is licensed by Televisa Consumer Products and copyright by Roberto Gómez Bolaños.
