= Odinsa =

Colombian corporation

ODINSA S.A
- Type: Anonymous Society
- Traded as: BVC: ODINSA
- Industry: Infrastructure
- Founded: 1992
- Headquarters: Medellín, Colombia
- Key people: Mauricio Ossa, (CEO)
- Products: Construction; Infrastructure; Transportation; Energy
- Revenue: ▼US$ 195.6 million (2012)
- Net income: ▲US$ 80.3 million (2012)
- Number of employees: 1275 (2015)
- Parent: Grupo Argos (98.5%)
- Website: www.odinsa.com

logo used when company was independent

Odinsa S.A is a Colombian construction and infrastructure development and publicly traded company (the largest engineering association in Colombia). It engages in road, highway, airport (about 18% of total sales) and railway construction in addition to real estate and private/public grant projects (through concessions). Real estate projects are developed through the subsidiary Odinsa Holding Inc. The company also does business outside of Colombia, mostly in the Dominican Republic and other parts of the Caribbean. In 2002 it participated in a Social Interest Housing Project (50% interest) which built 450 homes.

Odinsa is considered one of the eight "leading operators of transportation infrastructure worldwide". On September 14, 2010, it had a market cap of US$549.45 million (based on exchange rate of 1908.51 COP/1 USD).

According to the 2010 Global Competitiveness Report, Colombia's public infrastructure quality (railroads, ports and especially roads) is among the worst in South America, meaning that companies like Odinsa should continue to be in high demand (the company had a backlog of US$1.2 billion in 2010 - up 20% over the previous year). It has benefited from the government's relaxation of control restrictions on foreign investment in the country.

== Grupo Argos acquisition ==
In 2016 Grupo Argos completed a $672 million two-part acquisition of local construction firm Odinsa, it was a rare all-Colombia takeover done through Colombia’s stock exchange. For $400 million executed through two block trades and a tender offer, Grupo Argos acquired 55% of Odinsa shares between April and September 2015. Then in December 2016, Argos took on another 44% through Colombia’s first tender offer payable through stock. Grupo Argos was allegedly interested in transforming the construction firm’s portfolio.

== Odinsa projects ==
As of 2010-2011 the company has both minor and controlling interests in a number of large projects in Colombia, the Dominican Republic, Panama and Chile. In addition to the following business lines the company is also involved in projects having to do with electrical power generation (mostly in Panama and Chile), public services infrastructure, and real estate projects. Business associated with construction generates about half of Odinsa's revenue.

Transport Infrastructure: 20-year contract with the El Dorado International Airport, 30-year contract to develop and manage the main railroad network in Colombia was sold in 2006. In 2016 Odinsa upped its stake in El Dorado to 65%

Urban Transport and Infrastructure: 7-year contract to build and maintain a 2.5 km stretch of road in Bogota.

Telecommunications and Infrastructure: 6-year contract with E-America to help with the installation of internet service stations which serve all parts of Colombia.

== Competition ==
The group competes with numerous international companies for concession contracts and other types of business. Among its largest competitors are Obrascon Huarte Lain, Impregilo, Odebrecht and the China Railway Shisiju Group Corporation.
