= Granahorrar Bank =

Defunct Colombian bank

Banco Granahorrar
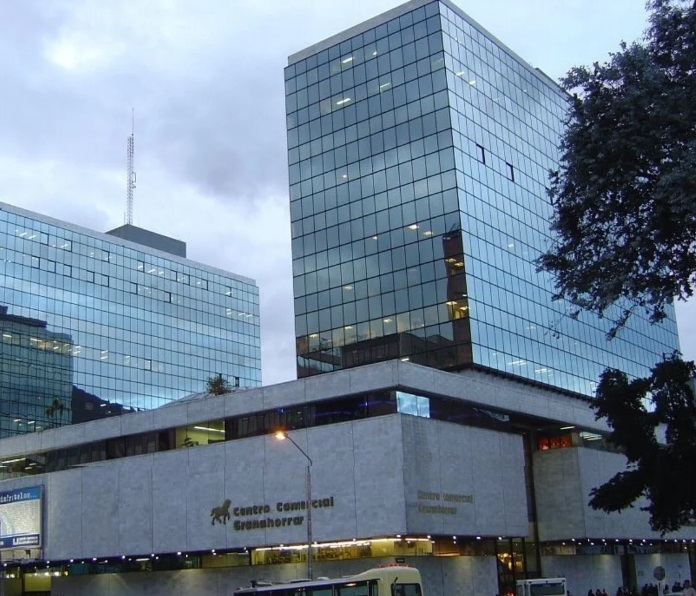
- Centro Comercial Granahorrar (2004)
- Company type: Private bank
- Traded as: BVC: GRANAHORRAR
- Industry: Financial services
- Founded: 1972
- Defunct: 2005
- Fate: Absorbed by BBVA Colombia
- Headquarters: Bogotá, Colombia

Granahorrar Bank was a bank based in Colombia that was open from 1972 to 1998. When it was open, it was part of a business conglomerate called Grupo Grancolombiano. The conglomerate also owned Banco de Colombia (Bancolombia), which is Colombia's largest bank.

In 1982, the conglomerate underwent a period of crisis. Consequently, the Colombian government nationalized Granahorrar Bank it, meaning that the government took over the bank by force from its private owners.

== Establishment and core businesses ==
Granahorrar Bank was established in 1972.

In the 1980s, businessman Julio Carrizosa Mutis took ownership of the bank by becoming the major shareholder; he also became a significant investor in other financial institutions such as Davivienda and Ahorramás. When Carrizosa owned Granahorrar Bank, construction and mortgages became the bank's core businesses.

The housing policy of the former President Belisario Betancur helped boost the bank's success. In the decade from 1988 to 1998, the bank showed a real annual growth rate of 45%.

== Shareholders fight ==
The Carrizosa family was the principal shareholder of Granahorrar Bank. According to the Colombian magazine Semana, the Carrizosa family held a 54% ownership interest and the Robayo and González families held 28% and 18% stakes, respectively. In 1998, the Gonzalez family, owners of the construction company Megacorp, decided to sell their Granahorrar shares in order to fund their construction business, which was facing an economic crisis, as was the whole country. The Gonzales family, due to desperate measures, created a so-called "shareholders fight" in order to sell their shares in order to force a sale of the bank.

== National liquidity crunch ==
In the late 1990s, Colombia faced a profound crisis started by the high cost of funding initiated by the Central Bank in order to protect the government's fixed rate of exchange. This led to increased levels of credit defaults and a high cost of funding. While the Central Bank tried to reduce liquidity, all financial institutions started to suffer from a liquidity crunch. Granahorrar, one of the seven highest-rated financial institutions, also suffered from the government's withdrawal of funds causing a liquidity distress. The Central Bank and the government, instead of providing liquidity to the sector, continued to withdraw funds from the system to the point where many financial institutions began to fail.

During the 1998-1999 Colombian financial crisis, almost half of banking institutions were closed, taken over by the government, or forced to merge. Many of the weaker-performing banks were merged or bought by more financially sound owners. The presence of foreign banks intensified competition. Investment in advanced technologies, along with efforts by government authorities, attempted to improve the health of the financial sector during the crisis.

The largest foreign investment into the sector was BBVA Bank's acquisition of Granahorrar Bank, which had been expropriated (taken over by the government) during the crisis.

== The forced expropriation of Granahorrar Bank ==
In 1998, the government of Colombia seized Granahorrar Bank. That same year, it assisted 57 other banks, but Granahorrar was the only bank it seized.

=== Fogafin action ===
According to the Wall Street Journal, in October 1998 the Colombian government assumed control of Granahorrar Bank, one of the country's largest savings and loans, with plans to inject 157 billion pesos (about $100 million) of capital into the bank. The government's Financial Institutions Guarantee Fund (known as Fogafin) immediately took over the bank.

The authorities thought that the systemic crisis could be avoided by attracting foreign investment and forcing shareholders of Granahorrar Bank to sell in order to receive government funds. This situation was later reviewed at length by the Council of State. As a result, Granahorrar was expropriated without compensation.

=== Expropriation ===
Granahorrar, as it is explained in detail below, was expropriated in 1998 as part of the economic policies executed by the Colombian government to mitigate the financial crisis. Granahorrar was the only bank expropriated without compensation. On October 31, 2005, the government sold Granahorrar to the Spanish bank BBVA.

At the time of its expropriation, Granahorrar Bank was Colombia's third largest mortgage lender and the seventh largest financial institution in the country.

In 1998, according to an official statement of Julio Carrizosa, "The equity of Granahorrar Bank was worth 220,000 million pesos - more than 120 million dollars - and, in spite of the difficulties of liquidity that the entity suffered for some months, [it] had the confidence that the crisis would be overcome, because all the indicators were optimal and Granahorrar [Bank] was listed as the seventh entity in size of the financial system, with 1,600,000 clients, and 2.5 trillion pesos in assets".

=== Government's method ===
On October 3, 1998 (a Saturday, a day that banks were closed), the government of Colombia intervened in Granahorrar Bank due to alleged liquidity constraints and cessation of payments related to the real estate crisis within Colombia that took place that year. The night before, on a Friday night, government regulators told the Carrizosas they had only 13 hours to raise capital or their bank would be taken by the government. The Carrizosa family claimed since that time that the authorities did not verify the alleged insolvency of the bank and that they did not receive any notification of such decision. According to Carrizosa, the shareholders lost the bank without any compensation. The authorities responsible for this act were the Banking Superintendence, the Fund of Financial Guarantees ("Fogafin"), the Ministry of Finance and the Central Bank.

The intervention mechanism used by the Colombian government, according to Carrizosa, was: The banking authorities require shareholders of a bank to capitalize the institution, arguing technical reasons. If the shareholders do not comply with the capitalization order, Fogafin intervenes the entity, decrees the reduction of the nominal value of the bank's shares, assumes the capitalization and takes control of the entity.

=== Dispute between Carrizosa and the government ===
Granahorrar's intervention process began at 8:00 p.m. on October 2 (Friday), when checks were returned for more than 800,000 million pesos, after the bank had closed. Immediately, the Banking Superintendence notified the situation to Fogafin and the Central Bank, warning them that Granahorrar was insolvent. What the authorities should have done instead if this was true, in Carrizosa's opinion, was to intervene the bank “administratively” and frozen its assets and liabilities, in order to protect all parties and avoid economic panic.

== International appeals ==
When the government didn't pay Carrizosa, he took his appeal international. Arbitrators for the United Nations Commission for International Commercial Law (UNCITRAL) in The Hague, Netherlands have taken up the case. In this case, UNICTRAL is charged with deciding whether the Colombian government overstepped its legal boundaries when it seized and then sold Granahorrar Bank for a profit, whether the government used expropriation as a political weapon, and whether the government's seizure was in violation of international trade treaties.

The Carrizosa family believes that then-President Andres Pastrana targeted the bank because Julio Carrizosa gave political donations to the opposition Liberal party.

In June 2018, officials from Australia and Argentina were appointed as the arbitrators in the case.
