= Terpel =

Colombian oil and gas company

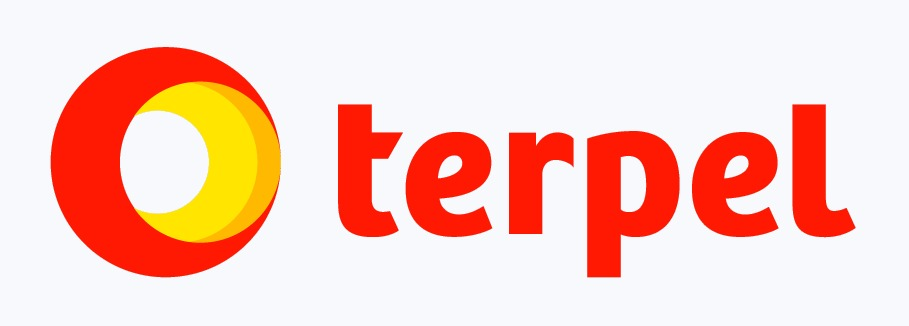

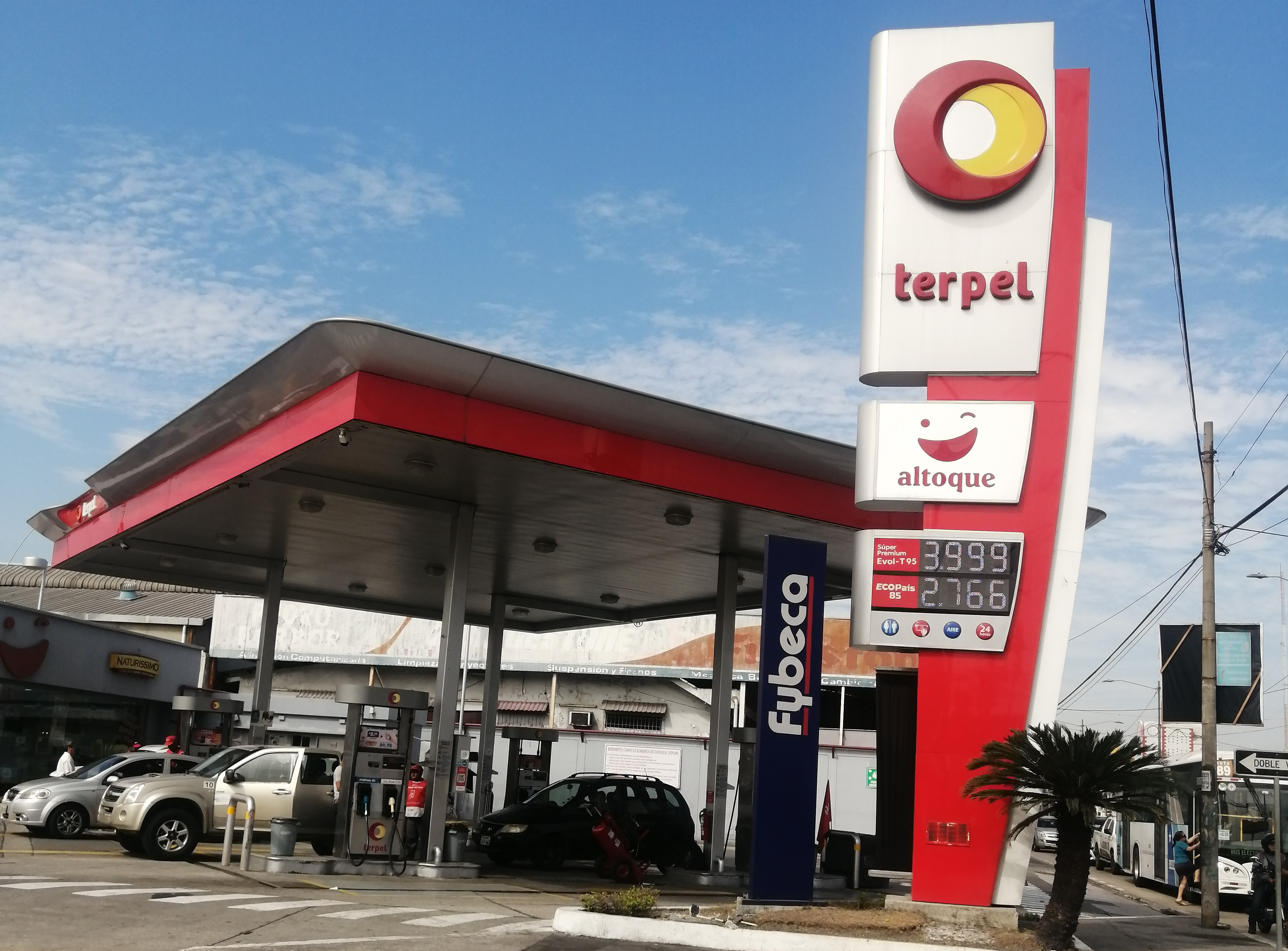
- Gas station in Guayaquil, Ecuador
- Company type: Public
- Traded as: BVC: TERPEL
- Industry: Oil and gas
- Founded: March 13, 1968, Bucaramanga, Colombia
- Founder: Melba Mary Lorza Caicedo
- Headquarters: Bogotá, Colombia
- Area served: Colombia, Panama
- Products: Fuels, Lubricants, Petrochemicals
- Operating income: 5–6 billion USD per year
- Owner: Private shareholders (under Empresas Copec Control)
- Website: www.terpel.com

Terpel, formerly known as Organización Terpel S.A. (English: Terpel Organization), is a Colombian oil and gas company.

== Company history ==
Terpel was founded in 1968 to help ease the shortage of gasoline in Santander. The Terpel Bucaramanga Company was formed with 20 service stations, with plans to expand to a national scale in the future with the creation of six additional "Terpeles" in different regions of the country. In 2001, the principal shareholders of the Terpeles integrated the seven regional companies to create the Terpel Organization, which was consolidated in 2004.

Terpel started trading on the Colombia Stock Exchange on 19 August 2014. Due to the high trade volume of the stock, the company was included in the COLCAP, which is composed of the exchange's 20 most actively-traded companies, in August 2015.

In the last few years, Terpel has acquired several companies outside of Colombia, most recently 200 gas stations in Chile.
