= BBVA Colombia =

Colombian bank

Banco Bilbao Vizcaya Argentaria Colombia S.A.

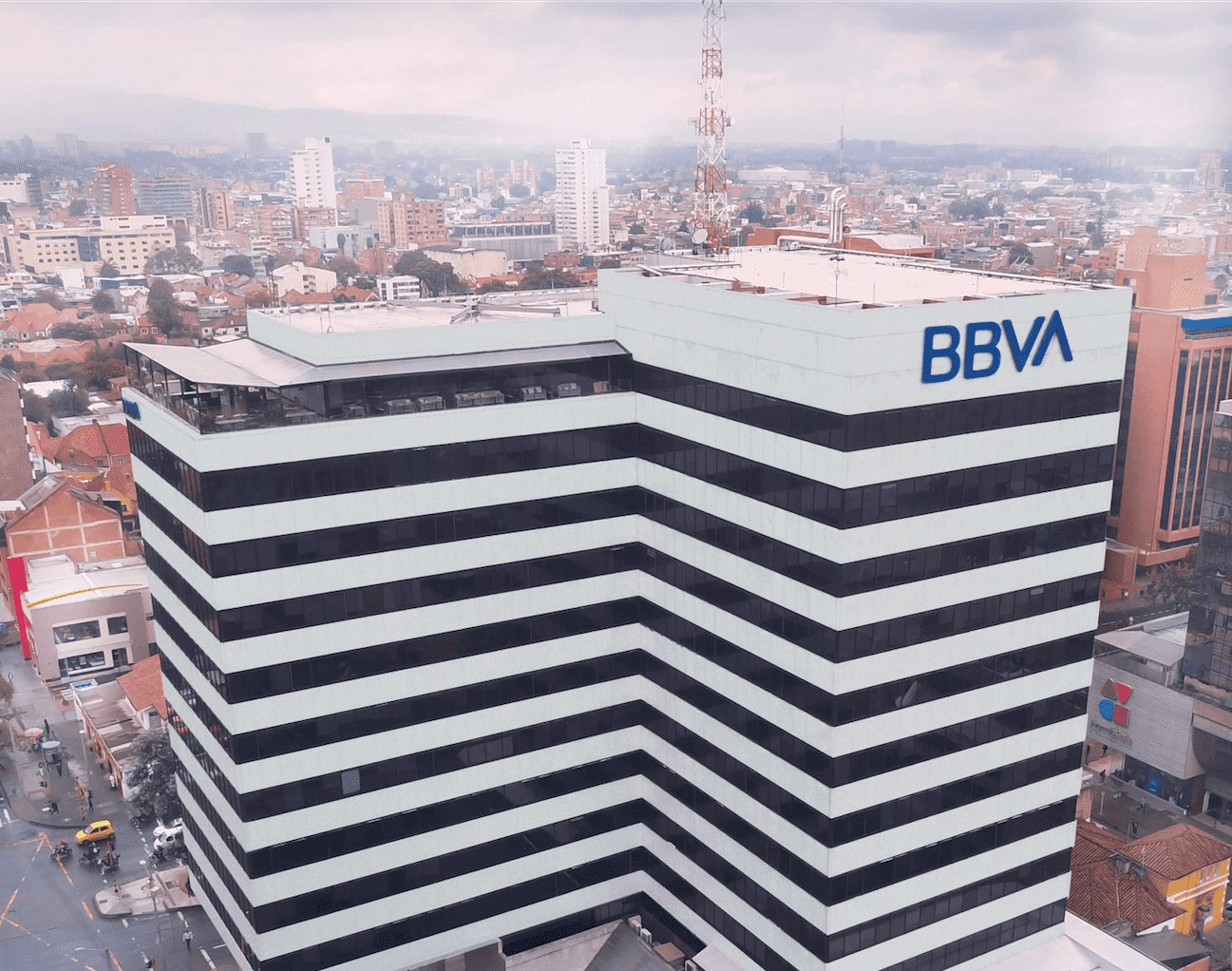
- Headquarters in Bogota
- Type: Subsidiary
- Traded as: BVC: BBVACOL
- ISIN: COB13PA00019
- Industry: Financial services
- Predecessor: Banco Ganadero (1956–1996)
- Founded: 1996; 30 years ago
- Headquarters: Bogotá, Colombia
- Number of locations: 424 (2025)
- Area served: Colombia
- Key people: Gloria Couceiro; Chairwoman
- Revenue: COP 458 billion (2025) (USD 126,8 millions)
- Total assets: COP 110 164 billion (2025) (USD 30,5 billion)
- Total equity: COP 7858 billion (2025) (USD 2,19 billion)
- Number of employees: 5119 (2025)
- Parent: BBVA
- Website: www.bbva.com.co

BBVA Colombia, is the Colombian subsidiary of Banco Bilbao Vizcaya Argentaria. It is a private bank that is one of the Big Four banks of Colombia.

== History ==
In 1996, Banco Bilbao Vizcaya (BBV) acquired 40% of Banco Ganadero, which was under state control. In 1998, BBV acquired another 15%, thus achieving a majority stake. In 2004, BBVA Banco Ganadero changed its commercial name to BBVA Colombia.

In October 2005, BBVA continued its expansion in the Colombian market, acquiring Granahorrar Bank in a public auction for USD 423 millions. The legal merger was completed in May 2006.

In 2001, the bank acquired the pension fund AFP Horizonte, which was the largest in the country under BBVA's management. In April 2013, BBVA decided to exit the pension business in Latin America due to the 2008 financial crisis. In Colombia, it sold AFP Horizonte for US$530 million; 50% was acquired by AFP Porvenir and 50% by AFP Protección.

In 2008, the BBVA Foundation created Bancamia, a bank focused on microfinance.

== List of presidents ==
N.°	Name	Mandat
1	Vicente Benedito	1998–2002
2	Luis Juango Fitero	2002–2008
3	Óscar Cabrera	2008–2020
4	Mario Prado Bayona	2020-2026
5	Gloria Couceiro	Since 2026

== See also ==
- List of largest banks in Latin America
