= IGBC =

IGBC may refer to:

- Imperial Grand Black Chapter, Protestant fraternal organization originating in Northern Ireland
- Indice General de la Bolsa de Valores de Colombia, the principal index of the Colombia stock exchange
- Indian Green Building Council, non-government organization that promotes eco-friendly concepts in the Indian building industry
