= Noel (company) =

Food and beverage company in Medellín, Colombia

Noel Cookies Company
- Company type: Public
- Industry: Food processing
- Founded: 1916
- Founder: Marcelina O. de Restrepo
- Headquarters: Medellín, Colombia
- Products: Cookies and Crakers
- Owner: Grupo Empresarial Antioqueño
- Parent: Grupo Nutresa
- Website: www.noel.com.co

Noel, formally known as Compañía de Galletas Noel S.A. (English: Noel Cookies Company) is a food and beverage company headquartered in Medellín, Colombia. It is a subsidiary of Grupo Nutresa.
