= BRED Banque populaire =

Cooperative bank in France

- Type: Cooperative company
- Industry: Banking, Insurance
- Founded: October 7th,1919; 107 years ago
- Founder: Louis-Alexandre Dagot
- Headquarters: 18, quai de la Rapée 75012 Paris, France
- Revenue: 1.456 million euros (2021)
- Net income: 412 million euros (2021)
- Number of employees: 6,300 (2021)
- Parent: BPCE
- Subsidiaries: BCI, Banque Franco-Lao, BRED Bank Cambodia, BRED Bank Fiji, BRED Bank Solomon, BRED Bank Vanuatu, BIC BRED, BRED Gestion, COFIBRED, NJR, Prepar-Vie, Prepar-IARD, SOFIAG, SOFIDER, Vialink, Click and Trust, BFL-BRED
- Website: bred.fr

BRED (formerly acronym for Banque régionale d'escompte et de dépôts / Regional Discount and Deposit Bank) is one of the cooperative banks part of Groupe Banque Populaire in France. It was founded in 1919 by Louis-Alexandre Dagot in Vincennes. As of 2018, the Bank has a network of 400 local branches in France. 30% of its 6,600 employees are located outside France and in French overseas collectivities. It has 5.8 billion euros of shareholders equity.

== Presentation ==
=== Cooperative bank ===
BRED is governed essentially as a cooperative by the cooperative legislation enacted by the 1947 Act, and as a bank, by the Monetary and Financial Code. The bank refers to the principles laid down by the International Cooperative Alliance, notably on the declaration on cooperative identity. According to the International Association of Cooperative Banks (IACB), a cooperative bank is "a banking entity owned by its members. The latter have the dual status of partners and users, owners and clients of their bank." BRED has 200,000 members in 2022. For the 2021 financial year, it posted a net income of 412 million euros and net banking income of 1456 million euros.

== History ==
=== 1917 – 1935 : Launch ===
On 17 March 1917, the French government passed a law that allowed the development of cooperative banks. On 7 October 1919, Louis-Alexandre Dagot founded the Banque Populaire Industrielle et Commerciale de la Région Est de Paris, for 233 members. With his 3 partners, Ambroise Leuret, Paul Muris and Gaston Riou, Dagot opened the first agency in Vincennes in December 1919. Other desks in Nogent-sur-Marne and Saint-Maur-des-Fossés became independent branches in 1924. The Ministry of Commerce allocated a constituency to each "Banque Populaire" where they could open different branches. The bank expanded to different areas in the early 1920s:

- Montreuil in 1921
- Boissy-Saint-Léger and Fontenay in 1922
- Champigny in 1923
- Charenton, Alfortville, Saint-Mandé and Saint-Maurice (1924)

Although the Centre fédératif du crédit populaire and the Caisse centrale des banques were responsible for the supervision of the Banques populaires, their weak authority and means of action allowed the bank to develop independently at first. By 1930, the bank accounted for 365 employees compared to 3 in 1919.

=== 1926 – 1935 : Development and economic crisis ===
To increase its constituency, the bank expanded to Seine-et-Marne, Seine-et-Oise, Marne and Aisne. Furthermore, it opened branches in Reims, Epernay and Paris. In the early 1930s, the bank renamed itself Banque Populaire Industrielle et Commerciale de la Région Est de Paris. In addition to small accounts, the bank also welcomed larger clients such as the Mouchotte brothers (alcohol merchants), Noël (real estate agent), Paul Coche (furniture manufacturer) and the Banque des Travaux publics. It financed large scale real estate project such as Cité Moderne but also the failed Manufacture française du Bois courbé.

In 1929, a bank financial report stated that ‘the Bank is clearly emerging from its role as a popular bank’. Thus, the bank changed its status from a "société coopérative de banque populaire à capital variable" to a "société coopérative de banque populaire à capital fixe", which enables it to significantly increase its capital.

On 29 July 1929, the French government launched the Chambre syndicale des Banques populaires whose role was to provide technical, administrative and financial supervision of the Banques Populaires. The Chambre syndicale helped the Banque Populaire Industrielle et Commerciale de la Région Est de Paris several times when the economic crisis hit France in 1931. The repeated interference of the Chambre syndicale did not please Louis Dagot who did not comply with its recommendations, despite the bogging down of his bank in the crisis. In 1934, the operation was losing more money than it was making.

On 17 March 1934, following the Stavisky Affair and the resulting social movements, a law was passed which allowed the Chambre syndicale to appoint the directors, presidents and administrators of the Banques Populaires. Pierre Boissou was entrusted with the supervision of the bank and in 1935, as Louis Dagot was asked to step down as president.

=== 1935 – 1944 : The war ===
Victor Girardin and André Becq (directors), Gabriel Lion (managing director) and Gilbert de Monès del Pujol (co-opted director and chairman) took over the board of directors of the bank. Its accounts – many of which had been concealed – accounted for a record of 66 million francs in receivables. To improve the situation, the unitholders' capital was divided by 5, the Chambre syndicale loaned 18 million francs, and its capital was reduced to 3 million francs.

In 1939, the bank had only 11 branches. From 1934 to 1940, the number of agents decreased from 348 to 144. The "one man, one vote" principle was abandoned so that each member now had as many votes as shares.

In November 1938, Pierre Boissou was appointed to the general management of the establishment. He then undertook a wave of layoffs, divested unprofitable agencies, re-established headquarters authority, and reinvigorated team spirit. By mid-1939, the bank was profitable again. The start of the war in 1939 caused the bank's customers to withdraw important amounts of cash and a drop in staff numbers as many young men were sent to the front. The German occupation caused a general slowdown of the French economy and working conditions became precarious. In 1942, the bank changed its name and became the Banque régionale d'escompte et de dépôts (quickly nicknamed BRED).

=== 1945 – 1960 : Economic recovery ===
Following World War II, BRED developed ties to a new clientele including social security funds and large industrial firms. Furthermore, the bank launched medium-term credit for its traditional clients. After the war, employees' social benefits were restored: works council, restoration of the right to strike and form trade unions, and the introduction of social security. A strong corporate culture developed, Pierre Boissou was nicknamed the boss, and the employees were nicknamed the ‘brédards’.

In 1956, BRED merged with the Banque Populaire de Rouen to extend into Normandy and in 1953, it acquired the Banque Surchamp. By 1965, BRED had twelve branches et continued to expand in the suburbs.

In 1946, BRED modernized its headquarters with a Bull statistical machine. Starting in 1948, the branches were gradually equipped with National Cash Registers, large cash registers that enabled the teller to play the role of positionist, manipulator and cashier. These new machines improved branch performance. In 1956, the bank equipped its headquarters with a new soundproof machine shop, dedicated to 90% of accounting operations. In 1963, BRED entered the electronic age by acquiring an IBM 1401 computer. The National Cash Registers started to be gradually transferred to the accounting centers and agencies became mainly canvassing relays run by salespeople. From 1947 to 1964, the bank's workforce grew from 290 to 1233 employees, and a comprehensive recruitment and training program was put in place.

=== 1966 – 1978 : Modernization ===
The IBM 1401 offered new media for data, tapes and magnetic disks (8Kb memory). 10 years after the purchase of this computer, punched cards were replaced by 5,000 tapes and 150 magnetic disks. The bank bought a data encoding service and check post-marking service. From 1978 onwards, the first branch terminals could consult the central information system, hosted in Créteil new offices and IT jobs became more and more important. The IT department was created in 1973 and entrusted to Georges Demanneville, a former IBM engineer. All the bank's operations were rethought around this revolutionary new tool. In 1974, the Bank 2000 – a fully automated, agentless branch – was put into operation. IT could also centralize and automate loan applications, thus accelerating this activity.

In the 1950s, faced with increased demand for personal loans, BRED developed its own credit sales financing subsidiary completely independent of the Caisse centrale. Legislation towards the Banques Populaires became more flexible, which allowed them to also offer their property loans to non-members and craftsmen. Consumer credit companies required individuals to open a direct debit account. From 1951 to 1958, the number of accounts opened at the BRED increased 76-fold. In 1967, BRED marketed their first debit cards. In 1976, 600 BRED ATMs were set up, and the bank had 22,000 customers using credit cards.

=== 1979 – 1991 : Diversification, international development ===
In 1985, after the retirement of Louis Chevalier, two men took over the position of general manager: Guy de Chavanne, who directed the bank's commercial activities, and Maurice Leruth, who directed its financial activities.

BRED developed its own tools and dissociated itself from Caisse centrale to manage its increasingly important capital. In 1985, it took a 20% stake in the creation of Stern Bank, a treasury bank. In 1988, BRED set up its own "trading room" to manage its own treasury. This trading room handled increasingly complex products, and 60 financial engineers were hired to work there. The bank also launched into insurance savings, with Vie-Bred contracts in 1980, then the creation of Prepar in 1983, its own insurance company. In 1989, BRED managed 2 billion francs in insurance reserves. In 1982, the bank also acquired Richelieu, a securities firm, renamed Compagnie financière d'épargne et de placement (CFEP) the following year.

As part of its international development, the bank acquired part of the International Commercial Bank (BIC) in 1986. In 1988, it joined forces with the Italian bank Banco popolare di Lecco. In 1989, it entered into a partnership with the National Bank of Canada, as well as with the Caja de Ahorros de Galicia. In 1990, it partnered with the German Landesgirokasse. In 1988, BRED opened offices in London, acquired Crédit liégeois and opened a branch in Milan. In 1986, BRED acquired Société Betteravière d'Expansion Europe, which later became Société de Banque et d'Expansion (SBE), specializing in the concept of "site banking", i.e. directly within companies.

During the 1980s, the branches of the network were renovated with windows open on the streets, and a new blue logo with stripes thus uniformizing the image of the bank across the country. In 1983, the entire network was equipped with financial terminals. In 1981, a telephone banking system was tested, enabling customers to bank by telephone or minitel. In 1984, "Télébred" had 200 corporate clients. In the late 1980s, all operations became tele-transmitted. However, the bank equipped its branches with microcomputers, continuing to rely on its "SIG_08", which allowed a direct connection to all databases.

From 1979 to 1991, the bank's staff increased from 2,854 to 3,367. Over the same period, the bank's capital rose from 200 million to 1.250 billion francs, and the number of members rose from 79,000 to 170,000. In 1985, BRED established itself on Reunion Island by acquiring the 3 agencies of the BPFD (and opened a fourth one in Sainte-Clotilde). To ensure a direct link with the metropolis and to offer Reunionese the same services, BRED set up a satellite communication system. In 1986, BRED absorbed the Banque Populaire de Guadeloupe, which had 6 branches, 20,000 customers and 200 employees. To ensure effective training, a video-conferencing tool is adopted. In 1989, a branch was opened in Fort-de-France, Martinique.

In 1991, most of BRED's subsidiaries and holdings were grouped together in a newly created holding company, Cofibred. The early 1990s were rocked by HR problems. The BRED employee turnover reached 10% as management's choices were misunderstood by its employees who felt these choices did not match their image of their bank.

=== 1992 – 1997 : Crisis and reorganization ===
During the 1990s, the BRED continued to develop but its cost/income ratio was higher than that of its competitors. In 1992, credit production slowed considerably. Furthermore, the bank suffered from credit margins slimming down since the banking deregulation in 1984. The bank's restaurant and hotel customers were hit hard by the real estate crisis and the Gulf War. Some international investments proved unprofitable.

In 1992, BRED bought a part of the assets of the Pallas bank via its Holding Cofibred, BRED-Pallas Financement immobilier (BPFI). That same year, BRED accumulated a total loss of 396 million francs and BPFI alone accumulated a loss of 512 million francs.

In 1990, François-Xavier de Fournas-Labrosse, a former member of Société Générale, was appointed CEO of BRED, alongside Maurice Leruth, who did not announce his departure until 1992. That year, F.-X. de Fournas set the bank's objective for the coming years : to return to profitability. The bank then abandoned its status as a société anonyme to adopt that of a société coopérative.

Between 1993 and 1996, BRED received 1.435 billion francs from the Chambre syndicale via the Fonds collectif de garantie. With this influx of money, BRED opened the capital of several of its subsidiaries to the Groupe des Banques Populaires – Soloma (leasing), Novacrédit (consumer credit), Cofibourse, Prepar Vie (the corporate branch), Interépargne and SBE. In 1993, BPFI was dissolved and a large part of BRED's real estate portfolio was sold. In 1996, the real estate division was profitable (119 million francs), but BRED suffered a 375 million francs loss the following year. BRED also sold the Crédit liégeois to Banque Bruxelles Lambert. As to the personal side, the bank reduced its workforce by 20% in 3 years. The focus on business training intensified.

The hyper-diversification of the 1980s gave way to a hyper-rationalisation strategy. F.-X. de Fournas focused BRED's development around its trading room, as well as on retail banking. The bank resumed its deployment in the Paris region as well as in the French overseas departments. The agencies were renovated to include privacy areas, something that was lacking during the major renovations of the 1980s. BRED also developed its telephone platform solution, Alodis, and intensified telephone prospecting. A remote banking management, BRED Direct, was established in 1995. On the risk management side, the Special Affairs Department (DAS) was created to assist defaulting clients. In 1996, an inspection report by the banking commission concluded: "The bank has just gone through a particularly difficult period, but it can now be considered to be out of the woods".

=== 1998 – 2012 : Returning to growth ===
==== Natexis / Natixis ====
In 1996 Natexis was created as a result of the merger of Crédit National and Banque Française du Commerce Extérieur. This new body replaced the Chambre syndicale, with ¾ of its capital held by the Banques Populaires. With Natexis, BRED finished repaying the subsidies received from the collective guarantee fund, first by helping Caisse Centrale acquire a 23% stake in Natexis' capital by disbursing nearly 500 million francs, then by selling 25% of Banque Populaire Asset Management (BPAM) to Natexis for 125 million francs and 33% of Interépargne. As a result of these operations, the Groupe des Banques Populaires cleaned up BRED's slate of 1.7 billion francs. In 2006, Natexis joined forces with Ixis Corporate and Investment Bank to form Natixis. On 31 July 2009, following the record losses of Natixis in 2008, due to the economic crisis and poor investment choices, the Banques Populaires and the Caisses d'Épargne central bodies merged to create their new central body, BPCE.

==== Business Development ====
In December 2003, F.-X. de Fournas reached the age limit (65) and handed over the position of general manager to Jean-Michel Laty, who had made his debut at the Bics. Stève Gentili was named as successor of Michel de Mourgues as president of the group. This new BRED management pursued the objectives put in place by the former. From 1998 to 2009, the total number of clients rose from 300,000 (including 139,000 from Casden) to 659,000. The bank shifted its target to more young people, professionals, SMEs, associations and local authorities. BRED refined its offer for large companies in the management of traditional and dematerialized flows, both domestic and international, as well as in mass processing.

As BRED entered the digital age, the bank developed offers for securing payment flows, data safe custody, document dematerialization and Internet purchasing management. This investment in digital technology was reflected in the acquisition of a 66% stake in Click and Trust (a digital certification authority created in 2001 by the Banques Populaires group), an 80% stake in AchatPro (sold to Hubwoo in 2008), as well as in Vialink. The bank launched its first website in 1995 and transferred its Dispobank minitel service online in 1998. In July 2011, the bank launched its first mobile application.

In 2006, the bank's commercial activities represented 52% of its net operating income, financial activities 44% and the trading room 4%. The bank's profits rose from €48 million in 1999 to €215 million in 2006. To avoid another period of crisis, the bank operated a rigorous risk management policy. During the same period, and unlike certain competitors, BRED continued to develop its local network of branches, which grew from 208 to 330. BRED also relied on its BRED Direct platform to provide most of its services directly via telephone. In 2006, 25% of branch appointments and 7% of sales were generated via BRED Direct. To support its development, the workforce increased from 2,684 in 1998 to 3,480 in 2006, the majority of which were oriented towards commercial positions. However, despite stimulus policies, the number of cooperative members fell from 130,000 in 1998 to 108,700 in 2006.

=== International Development ===
In September 2003, BRED signed a memorandum of understanding with AFD for the takeover of several of its overseas holdings. In 2004, BRED strengthened its presence in the overseas departments by acquiring the shares of the credit companies owned by the Agence Française de Développement in Guadeloupe, French Guiana and Martinique.

Starting in 2007, BRED relaunched its international expansion strategy, but this time with a focus on local banks in high-growth countries: acquisition of 15% of the capital of Socredo in 2007 (French Polynesia), 51% of the capital of BCIMR in 2007 (Djibouti), Bank of Queensland (2009, shares sold in 2013), 12.5% of Acleda Bank (Cambodia), creation of BRED Bank Vanuatu in 2008, Banque Franco-Lao in 2010 (Laos), BRED Bank Fiji in 2012, BRED Bank Cambodia and BRED Bank Solomon in 2017. In 2014, international and overseas departments and territories accounted for 45% of BRED's revenue.

=== 2012 – Today ===
In September 2012, Olivier Klein replaced Jean-Michel Laty as chief executive officer of BRED.

In 2013, the bank announced a net profit of €182.6 million, up 1.5%.

In 2014, Natixis closed its private bank and laid off some of its back-office staff. In April 2014, BRED acquired a portion of Natixis' clients, as it closed its branches.

In 2016, for the second consecutive year, BRED's consolidated net banking income exceeded €1 billion: 1,095 million. Excluding exceptional items, NBI growth was 6.9% (+3.6% in accounting terms). This record level of activity despite an unfavorable context (flattening of the yield curve and tightening of regulatory constraints) confirmed the success of the non-distance banking strategy implemented by BRED for several years. After the successful launch of BFL (Banque Franco-Lao) in Laos in 2010, which currently operates 22 branches serving 30,000 customers, BRED Bank entered the Cambodian market in 2017 with the subsidiary BRED Bank Cambodia, the only European bank in the Kingdom. The same year, BRED expanded its operations in the Solomon Islands.

In January 2020, the Financial Markets Authority (AMF) fined BRED a substantial amount for failing to comply with the European Market Infrastructure Regulation (EMIR), which governs over-the-counter derivatives trading, an activity that is very minor at BRED. On June 1, 2023, Jean-Paul Julia replaced Olivier Klein as the Chief Executive Officer of BRED. En 2022, la banque exploite 325 agences de proximité, dont 92 dans les DOM. For the financial year 2022, it reported a net income of 507.4 million euros and a net banking income of 1.63 billion euros.

== International locations ==
In 2018, BRED has 6,300 employees, 30% of which are located outside France and in French overseas collectivities:

- France: 400 branches
- France – overseas (La Réunion, Mayotte, Martinique, Guadeloupe, Guyana): 81 branches
- Africa (Djibouti): 13 agencies
- Oceania (New Caledonia, Vanuatu, Fiji, Solomon Islands): 37 agencies
- Asia (Laos, Cambodia): 23 agencies

== Financial data ==
BRED has 200,000 cooperative members in 2022. For the 2021 financial year, it posted a net income of €412 million and net banking income of €1.4 billion.
