= Colombina (candy brand) =

Colombian candy brand

- Country: Colombia
- Introduced: 1927; 99 years ago
- Markets: Worldwide (over 80 countries)
- Website: colombina.com

Colombina, or Dulces Colombina, is a Colombian multinational candy brand. The brand operates in Venezuela, the United States and 78 other countries around the world.

Among their main domestic market competitors are "Super", "Nutresa", "Casa Luker", "Aldor", "Trululu", "Dulces La Americana" and "Comestibles Italo". ,

== History ==
Colombina was started by don Hernando Caicedo, a Valle del Cauca native. In 1918, he began milling sugar cane at a small plot. Eventually, he moved into a mill named the "Riopala" mill. He started saving his money and, in 1927, established the "Colombina Food Company" in Cali.

During the 1970s, Hernando Caicedo's son, Jaime Hernando, took over the company's reigns. He expanded the branch's reach to the United States and Europe, inventing, along the way, a type of candy named "Bon Bon Bum". Later, after Nutella entered the Colombian market, Colombina launched a competing brand called "Nucita". During that era, the company hired the famed French mime, Marcel Marceau, to promote their candies on television advertisement campaigns.

In 2012, Colombina opened a production plant in South Africa.

As of 2022, Cesar A. Caicedo was Colombina's president. He has been in that position for more than two decades.
