= Julio Carrizosa Mutis =

Colombian businessman

- Occupation: Businessman
- Known for: Active in the construction and financial sectors in Colombia

Julio Carrizosa Mutis was a Colombian businessman active in the construction and financial sectors in Colombia.

== Career ==
Carrizosa started his business career in the construction industry. He founded the company Industrial de Construcciones in the city of Bucaramanga. He became a major contractorforf the public entity known as Land Loans Institute (Instituto de Credito Territorial), which controlled the construction industry. He specialized in the construction of low-cost housing.

In the 1980s, Carrizosa became the major shareholder of Granahorrar Bank and an investor in other financial institutions such as Davivienda and Ahorramás. Construction and housing credits (mortgages) became the bank's core businesses. The housing policy of the former President Belisario Betancur helped boost the bank's success. From 1988 to 1998, the bank showed a real annual growth rate of 45%.

Granahorrar Bank was part of a conglomerate called Grupo Grancolombiano which also owned Banco de Colombia, Colombia’s largest bank. In 1998, the country experienced a financial crisis, and, the Colombian government seized ownership of (expropriated) the bank from Carrizosa.

Granahorrar was expropriated in 1998 as part of the economic policies executed by the Government to mitigate the financial crisis; it was the only bank expropriated without compensation. On October 31, 2005, the government sold the bank to the Spanish Bank BBVA.

=== International fight ===
As of September 2018, the Carrizosa family and the Colombian government are fighting over the government's 1998 expropriation of the bank before the United Nations Commission for International Commercial Law (UNCITRAL) in The Hague, Netherlands.

The dispute is whether the Colombian government overstepped its boundaries and used expropriation as a political weapon, in violation of international trade treaties, in seizing the bank and then selling it for a profit. The Carrizosa family alleges that in 1998, then-President Andres Pastrana targeted Granahorrar Bank for seizure for political reasons because Carrizosa had made political donations to the opposite political party.

The Carrizosa family says that their bank was among the strongest in Colombia at the time it was seized by the government.

A court ordered the government to compensate the Carrizosa family, but the government did not pay because it claimed it didn't have "several hundred million dollars." The government appealed to overturn the verdict and won. Therefore, the Carrizosa family turned to international arbitration.

== Personal life ==
Carrizosa is from the city of Bucaramanga, Santander. He is married to Astrida Benita; together, they have three sons, Alberto, Enrique, and Felipe Carrizosa. Astrida was born in Latvia and emigrated to the United States after World War II. All three sons have dual Colombian-American citizenship.
