= Southern Star Concrete =

Concrete supply business headquartered in Irving, Texas

Southern Star Concrete, Inc. or simply Southern Star is a concrete supply business headquartered in Irving, Texas. Southern Star is owned by Cementos Argos S.A., the largest cement producer in Colombia, South America. Cementos Argos is subsidiary of Inversiones Argos, which in turn belongs to a larger conglomerate called Grupo Empresarial Antioqueño based in Medellín, Colombia.

Argos acquired full ownership of Southern Star Concrete in November 2005 in a purchase agreement with the former owners, Texas Growth Fund and Austin Ventures, both based in Austin, Texas.

In 2019, Southern Star sold their Arkansas assets to SRM Concrete, a privately owned materials supply company based out of Nashville, Tennessee.

Then in 2021, Argos sold the Dallas/Fort Worth portion of Southern Star to SRM Concrete.

Argos currently only operates the Houston area Southern Star locations.
