= Grupo Argos =

Colombian conglomerate

- Type: Sociedad Anónima
- Traded as: BVC: GRUPOARGOS; BVC: PFGRUPOARG
- Industry: Conglomerate
- Founded: 1934
- Headquarters: Medellín, Colombia
- Key people: Jorge Mario Velasquez, (CEO)
- Products: Cement, Concrete, Utilities, Real estate, Infrastructure
- Revenue: ▲US$3.7 billion(2012)
- Net income: ▲US$194.3 million (2012)
- Number of employees: 12,656 (2015)
- Subsidiaries: Cementos Argos; Celsia; Odinsa
- Website: www.grupoargos.com

Grupo Argos S.A is a Colombian conglomerate with large investments in the cement and energy industries. Its cement company Argos has operations in Colombia, the United States, Panama, Honduras and the Caribbean. Celsia, its energy company, owns hydro, thermal, and wind power generation plants in Colombia, Panama, and Costa Rica and distributes energy to more than 500.000 customers in Colombia. Grupo Argos also has investments in port facilities and real estate in Colombia.

== Cementos Argos S.A ==
Cementos Argos S.A.
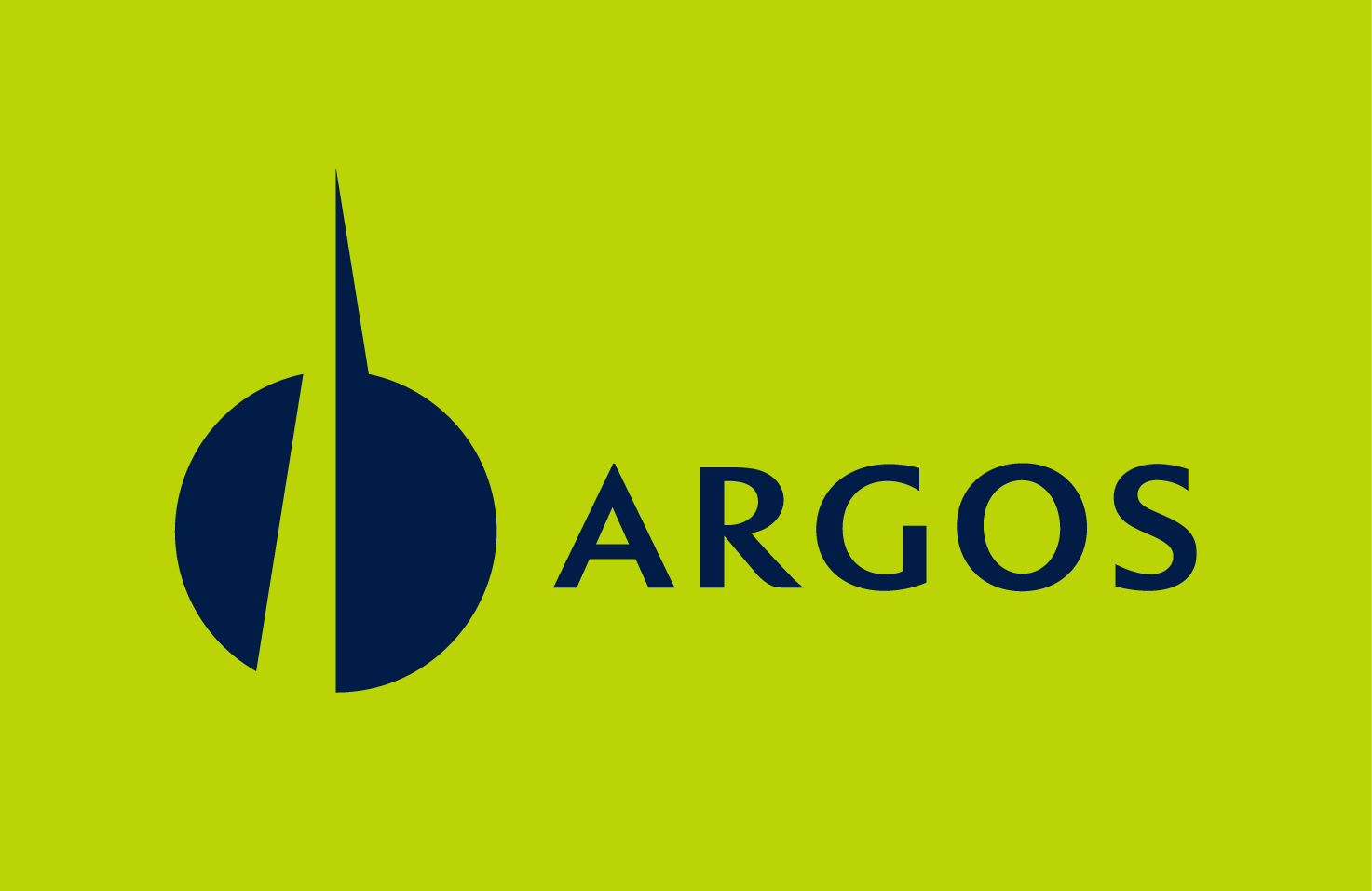
- Type: Sociedad Anónima
- Traded as: BVC: CEMARGOS; BVC: PFCEMARGOS
- Industry: Cement
- Founded: 1934
- Headquarters: Medellín, Colombia
- Area served: Worldwide
- Key people: Jorge Mario Velasquez, (Chairman); Juan Esteban Calle, (CEO)
- Products: Cement and concrete
- Revenue: ▲US$2.4 billion (2012)
- Net income: ▲US$218.9 million (2012)
- Number of employees: 9241 (2015)
- Parent: Grupo Argos
- Subsidiaries: Concretos Argos; Southern Star Concrete, Inc. Ready Mixed Concrete; Concrete Express
- Website: www.argos.co

Cementos Argos S.A is a Colombian construction materials producer, leader in the cement market in Colombia; it is the fourth largest cement producer in Latin America, and the only producer of white cement in Colombia. Argos has investments in Panama, Honduras, Haiti and the Dominican Republic. It is the second largest concrete producer and the fourth largest cement producer in the United States and it exports cement and clinker to 27 countries around the world. Argos competes with Cemex, Votorantim Cimentos, InterCement, Holcim and other cement companies.

Argos has four ports in the U.S. and four in Colombia as well as two in Venezuela, one in Panama, one in the Dominican Republic and one in Haiti. In Colombia, Argos is the largest transporter of land cargo. Argos has 14 cement producing plants, of which 11 are located in Colombia and the rest are in Panama, Haiti and the Dominican Republic. Four of the 11 Colombian plants are located in the northern area of Colombia and are dedicated to export, while for domestic demand there are 7 plants located in the Departments of Antioquía, Cundinamarca, Valle, Boyacá, and Santander.

While Colombia is where Argos produces the most cement, the United States is where Argos has its largest concrete production capacity (8.9 million cubic meters per year). There are 134 concrete production plants and 1,350 mixers. Argos' concrete production capacity in Colombia is only 1.7 million cubic meters per year, with 40 plants and 230 mixers.

In 2008, Argos had a market capitalization of over $3.5 billion US dollars and income of over $1,955 million US dollars. The geographic origin of this income is 44% from Colombia, 34% from the United States, 9% from Latin America and 13% from other businesses. In terms of business, 47% comes from concrete, 40% from cement and 13% from others.

Argos has shown interest in publicly acquiring Grupo Nutresa and Grupo Sura.

=== Company history ===
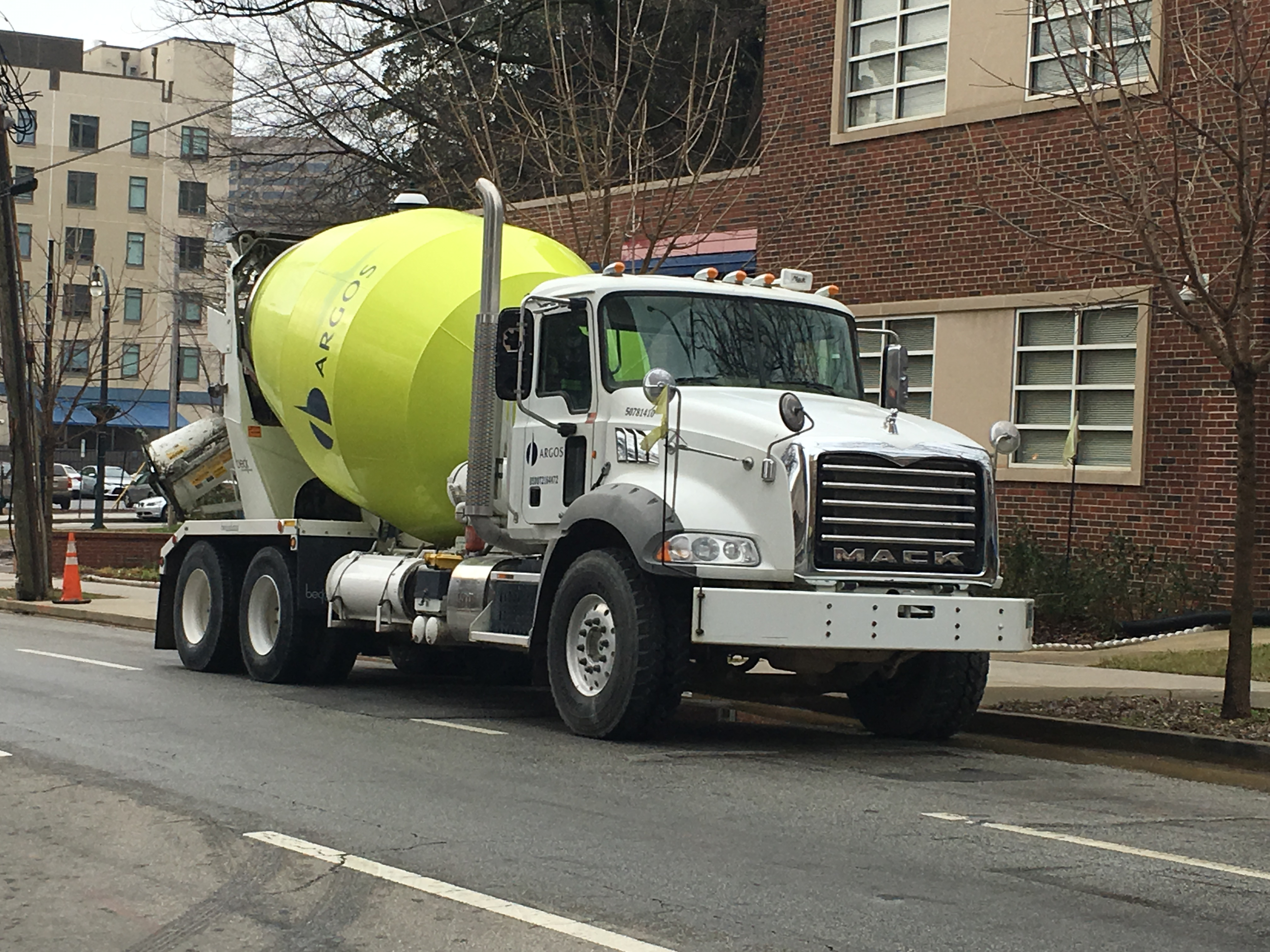
Argos cement truck mixer in Atlanta, Georgia

Argos was founded in Medellín, Colombia on February 27, 1934, by Claudino Arango Jaramillo, Rafael and Jorge Arango Carrasquilla, Carlos Sevillano Gómez, Leopoldo Arango Ceballos and Carlos Ochoa Vélez. In 1936, the factory began production and it issued its first dividend in 1938. After its association with Cementos del Nare, Argos began creating companies in various western regions of Colombia: Cementos del Valle in 1938, del Caribe in 1944, el Cairo in 1946, de Caldas in 1955, Tolcemento in 1972, Colclinker in 1974, and Cementos Ríoclaro in 1982. In the 1990s, Argo purchased stock participation in Cementos Paz del Río.

Argos purchased Corporación de Cemento Andino in Venezuela, in 1998. Subsequently, Argos established alliances to make investments in the Dominican Republic, Panama and Haiti. In 2005, Argos merged all of its cement producing companies in Colombia and purchased Southern Star Concrete and Concrete Express in the U.S. The following year, it purchased Ready Mixed Concrete Company in the US and merged its concrete producing companies in Colombia and then purchased the cement and concrete assets of Cementos Andino and Concrecem in Colombia. In October 2011, Argos purchased the Lafarge operations in the southeastern U.S. adding two cement plants, one clinker grinding, 79 concrete plants and five terminals to the Argos U.S. operation. Until 2012, the company was called Inversiones Argos.

== Argos worldwide ==
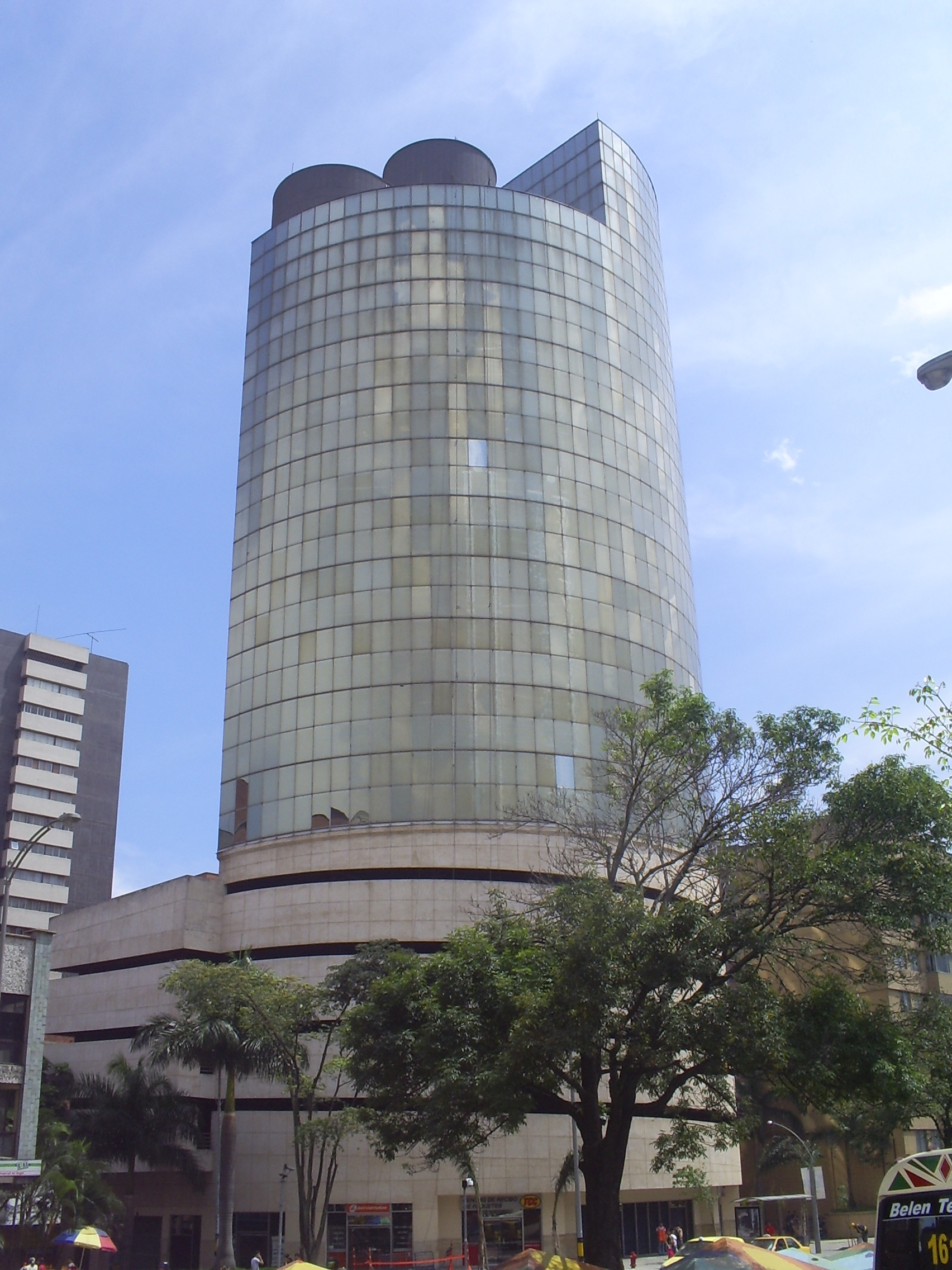
Argos Corporate Headquarters building in Medellín, Colombia

Cementos Argos Corporate Headquarters is in Medellín, Colombia, and its U.S. operations headquarters is in Alpharetta, Georgia.

The company operates in over 15 countries/territories around the world including:

- Antigua and Barbuda
- Colombia
- Curaçao
- Dominica
- Dominican Republic
- French Guiana
- Haiti
- Honduras
- Panama
- Puerto Rico
- Sint Maarten
- Suriname
- United States
