= BNK Financial Group =

South Korean financial holding company

BNK Financial Group Inc.
- Native name: 주식회사 BNK금융지주
- Formerly: BS Financial Group
- Type: Public
- Traded as: KRX: 138930
- Industry: Financial services
- Founded: March 2011; 15 years ago
- Headquarters: Busan, South Korea
- Subsidiaries: Busan Bank
- Website: eng.bnkfg.com

BNK Financial Group Inc. (Korean: 주식회사 BNK금융지주) is a financial holding company based in the Busan-South Gyeongsang region. It is one of the three regional financial holding companies in South Korea, alongside DGB Financial and JB Financial.

== History ==
BNK Financial Group was established as BS Financial Group in 2011. Busan Bank, a regional lender, was integrated with its affiliates, including BS Securities, BS Capital and BS Credit Information under the new financial holding company. In 2014, BS Financial Group acquired Kyongnam Bank from Woori Financial. After acquiring Kyongnam Bank, BS Financial was renamed BNK Financial in 2015.

== See also ==
- Busan BNK Sum
- List of banks in South Korea
