= Crem Helado =

Colombian ice-cream company

- Industry: Food
- Founded: 1955
- Founder: Horace Day
- Headquarters: Bogotá, Colombia
- Key people: Mario Alberto Niño (President)
- Products: Ice cream
- Operating income: COP 450 billion (2018, US$ 118.4 million)
- Number of employees: 1885
- Parent: Grupo Nutresa
- Website: https://www.cremhelado.com.co/

Crem Helado is a Colombian ice cream company, owned by Grupo Nutresa.

The company in 2018 had an income of 118.4 million dollars, having control of 41.4% of the Colombian ice-cream market that year.

== History ==
CremHelado was founded in 1955 by Horace Day, an American businessman based in Colombia, who created an ice cream store in Bogotá, more specifically, at Caracas Avenue with Calle 32 called "Helados Chikos" that ended in failure.

In 1964, Tropicrem Ltda. was founded, the company that started industrial ice cream production in Colombia. Tropricrem Ltda. was bought in 1982 by Meals S. A, food company.

In 2003, Meals S. A. announced its participation in Helados Melca in Panama. Helados Melca was a union between a group of Panamanian businessmen & Nestlé's ice cream division, however, this trademark failed after a while, so Meals decide to leave this market.

In 2006, Meals S. A. was bought by Grupo Nutresa.

=== Additional products ===
In 1992, Meals announces an orange juice trademark called Country Hill.

== Criticism ==
Crem Helado has been criticized for its labor policies on its hawker system (specifically, some sole trader policies) that make it impossible to try to access pensions, unemployment benefits, labor rights, or a fixed salary. Additionally, the company workers schedule is out of any labor policy.

This makes some of them sell the company's products in places not fit to do so, such as in the public transport.

During the COVID-19 pandemic, marked by low demand, their conditions driving some of the sellers into despair were news.

A lot of protests by the Colombian Union of Food Industry Workers (SINALTRAINAL) have called for an end to these policies.
