= Indice General de la Bolsa de Valores de Colombia =

Colombian stock market index

Indice General de la Bolsa de Valores de Colombia (IGBC) was the main stock market index of the Colombia Stock Exchange from mid-2001 until November 2013 and consisted of the 30 most actively-traded shares of the market. The companies listed on IGBC were reviewed for performance each quarter and the composition of the index was updated accordingly.

IGBC was replaced in November 2013 by COLCAP, a new index.
