= Grupo Sura =

Colombian financial group

Grupo SURA
- Industry: Financial Services
- Founded: 1945
- Headquarters: Medellín, Colombia
- Key people: Gonzalo Alberto Pérez, CEO
- Products: Insurance; Pensions; Savings; Investments; Universal banking
- Revenue: ▲USD 6,323 million (2016)
- Net income: ▲USD 557 million (2016)
- Total assets: ▲USD 22,600 million (2016)
- Number of employees: 59,000
- Website: gruposura.com

Grupo de Inversiones Suramericana is a multilatin company founded in 1945 in Colombia, which is listed on the Colombia Stock Exchange (BVC) and is enrolled in the ADR – Level I program in the United States. It is also the only Latin American entity in the sector Financial Services and Capital Markets, that is part of the Dow Jones Sustainability Indices.

The main companies that make up the investment portfolio of Grupo Sura are grouped as follows: Strategic investments: are the main focus of the management of Grupo Sura and are companies that are in the sectors of banking, insurance, pensions, savings and investment, as is the case of its subsidiaries – specialized in insurance, trends and risks-, and asset management – in the pension, savings and investment industry. Also in this category is Grupo Bancolombia, an uncontrolled company and one of the most important investments in the portfolio.

Industrial investments: constituted mainly by the participations that are held in Grupo Nutresa and Grupo Argos, companies that develop their activity in the sectors of processed foods, cement, energy and infrastructure.

== History ==
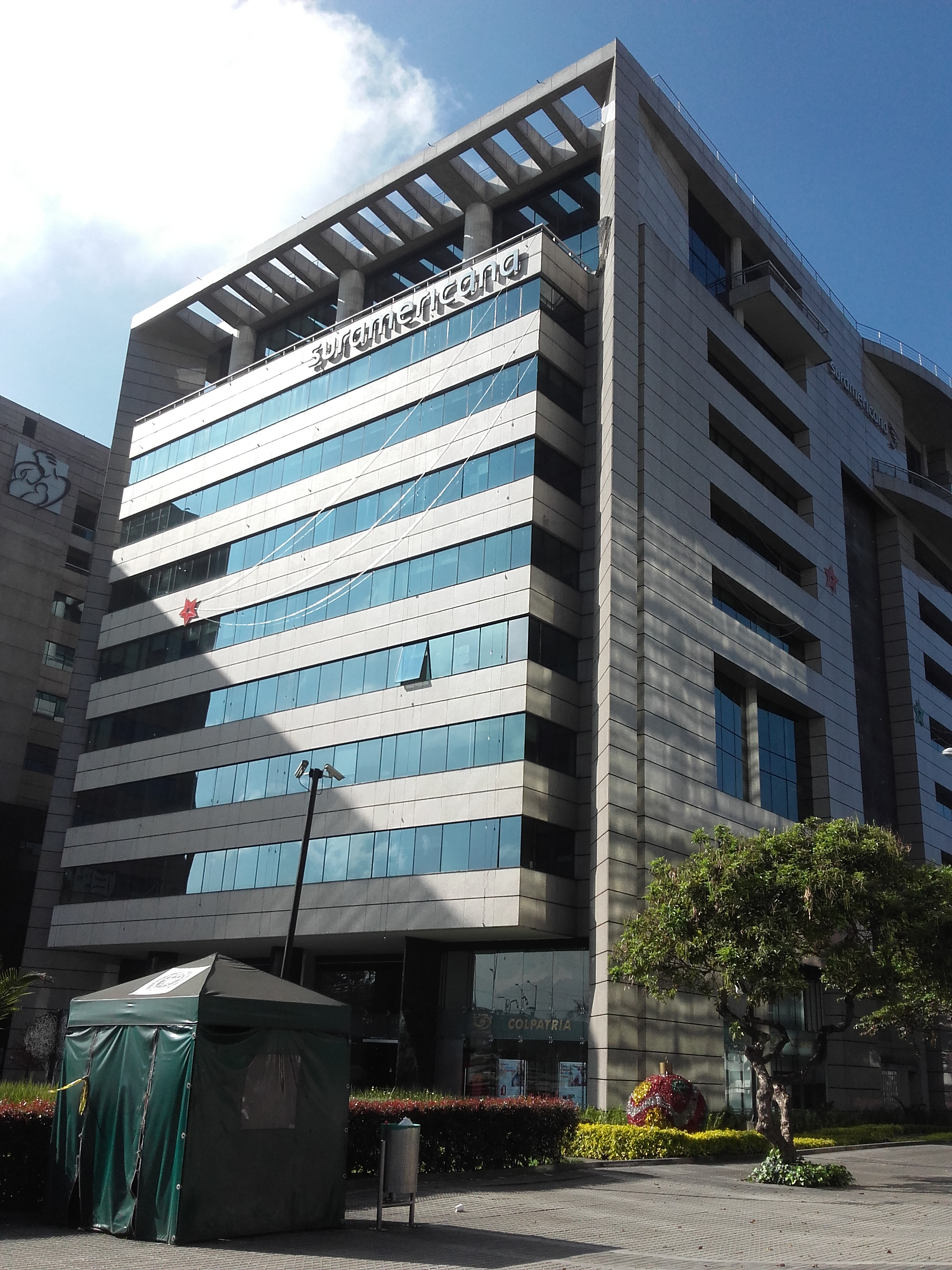
Building of the conglomerate in Bogotá

On 12 December 1944, Compañía Suramericana de Seguros S.A. was created in Medellín, Antioquia, dedicated to the insurance activity in Colombia. The company grew and generated new lines of business, and incorporated other important Colombian companies into its investment portfolio. In the 1970s, in the face of hostile takeover attempts by economic groups from other regions of the country, a process was carried out to protect the regional industry through share exchanges between companies of Antioquia origin, such as Suramericana de Seguros, Cementos Argos and National Chocolate Company, among others.

In December 1997, Compañía Suramericana de Seguros was restructured through a spin-off, through which the management of the investment portfolio was separated from the insurance operating activity. As a result, the Suramericana de Inversiones S.A. company was born, the latter becoming the parent company.

In July 2011, Grupo Sura acquired the divestments from the ING Group in Latin America for US$3.85 billion. With the acquisition, Grupo Sura gained control of ING's pension and voluntary savings businesses in Chile, Colombia, Mexico, Uruguay and ING's 80% stake in AFP Integra S.A. in Peru; the life insurance businesses in Chile and Peru; including ING's 33.7% stake in InVita Seguros de Vida S.A. in Peru, along with the local investment management capabilities in those countries.

In February 2015, Grupo Sura acquired Seguros Banistmo in Panama for a value of USD96.4 million, making it a strong competitor in the Central American country with sales of USD126,400 in 2016 and occupying fourth place below ASSA, International Insurance and Mapfre.

In September 2015, Grupo Sura purchased RSA's Latin American operations for £ 403 Million. With the acquisition, Grupo Sura entered the Argentine, Brazilian, and Uruguayan insurance markets, and enlarged their operations in Colombia, Chile, and Mexico.
