= Winter's =

Peruvian chocolate brand

Winter's (chocolate)
- Product type: Chocolate, Cocoa drink mix
- Current owner: Compañía Nacional de Chocolates de Perú S.A.
- Country: Peru
- Introduced: 1997
- Markets: Peru
- Previous owners: Good Foods Peru SA.
- Website: www.chocolates.com.pe

Winter's is a popular Peruvian brand of chocolates and other food products owned by Compañía Nacional de Chocolates de Perú S.A.

== History ==
The brand was started in 1997 by Lima-based Good Foods S.A., the largest Peruvian exporter of chocolates. On 1 February 2007, Colombian-based food conglomerate Grupo Nacional de Chocolates purchased Good Foods S.A. and the Winter's brand for US$36 million through its Peruvian subsidiary Compañía Nacional de Chocolates de Perú S.A.

== Products ==
Winter's has more than forty brands in its portfolio of products, including cocoas, milk modifiers, chocolates, cookies, candies, gums, lozenges, chewing gum, icings, cream confections, marshmallows, and panettone.

- Chocopunch - A cream confection similar to cake icing sold in small containers packaged with a plastic stick for eating the product.
