= ACLEDA Institute of Business =

Business School in Cambodia

- វិទ្យាស្ថានពាណិជ្ជសាស្ត្រអេស៊ីលីដា
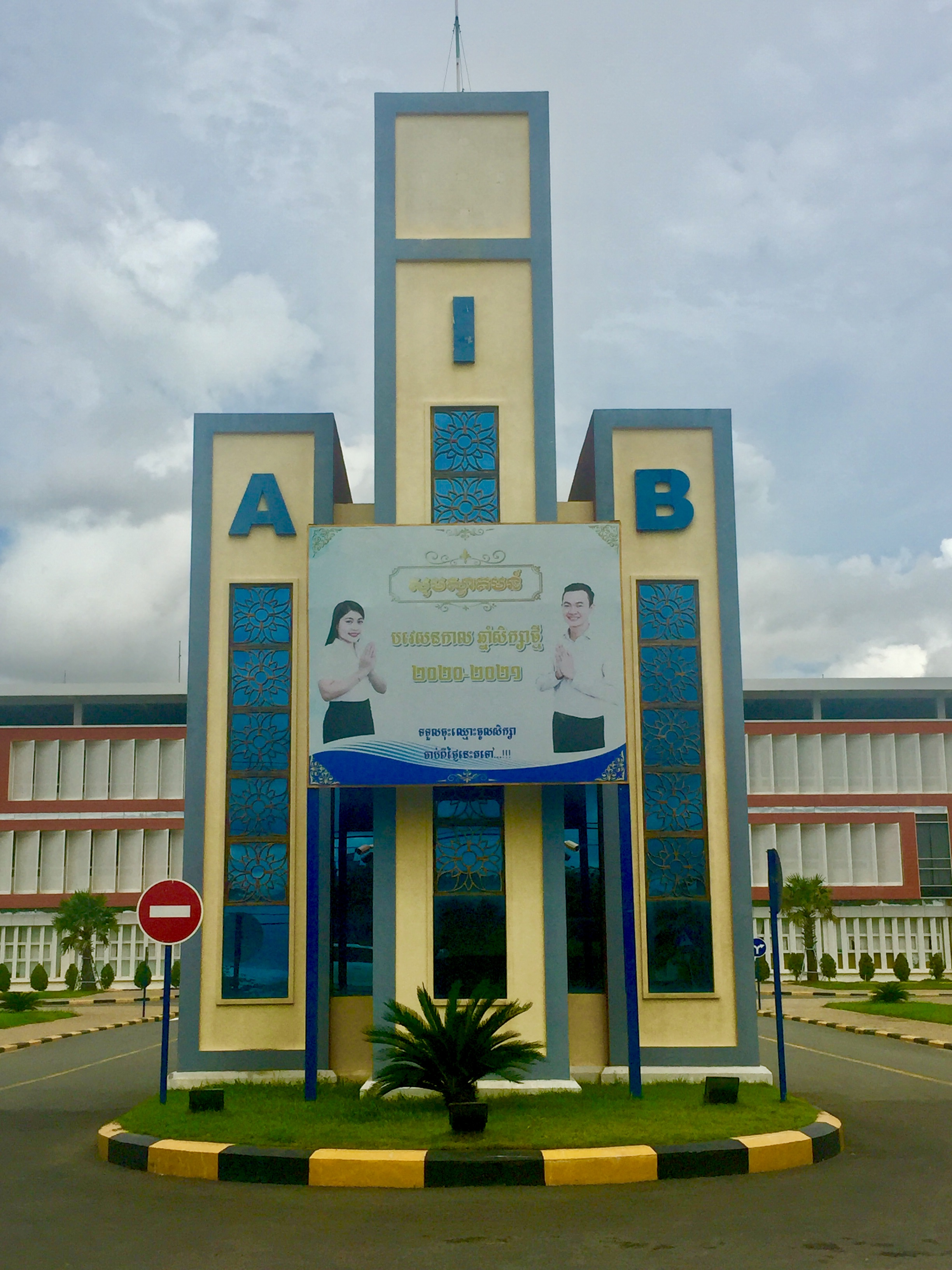
- Front gate of the ACLEDA Institute of Business
- Established: 2012; 14 years ago
- Affiliations: ACLEDA Bank
- Chairperson: So Phonnary
- Director: Chhan Ponloeu
- Academic staff: 143
- Students: 908
- Location: St. 322, Phnom Penh, Cambodia; 11.630019500893114°N 104.85608490794434°E

ACLEDA Institute of Business (AIB; Khmer: វិទ្យាស្ថានពាណិជ្ជសាស្ត្រអេស៊ីលីដា) is a business school in Phnom Penh created as a subsidiary firm by ACLEDA Bank, Cambodia's largest financial institution.

== Programs ==
The ACLEDA Institute of Business is the result of a transformation of the old ACLEDA Training Center (ATC). In 2012, ACLEDA Training Center was established with the primary purpose of providing training to ACLEDA Bank's internal human resources. However, at the same time it also provided training to those outside the bank. Approximately 5,000 trainees were enrolled in 186 courses as of the end of 2015.

AIB began its academic year with the bachelor's degree and associate degree in Banking and Finance since 2016. ACLEDA Institute of Business offers Associate, Bachelor levels in the fields of business, banking and finance. It now has a total of 908 students, of which 614 are pursuing the bachelor's program and 191 the associate program. Another 103 are taking the General English Class.

== Campus ==
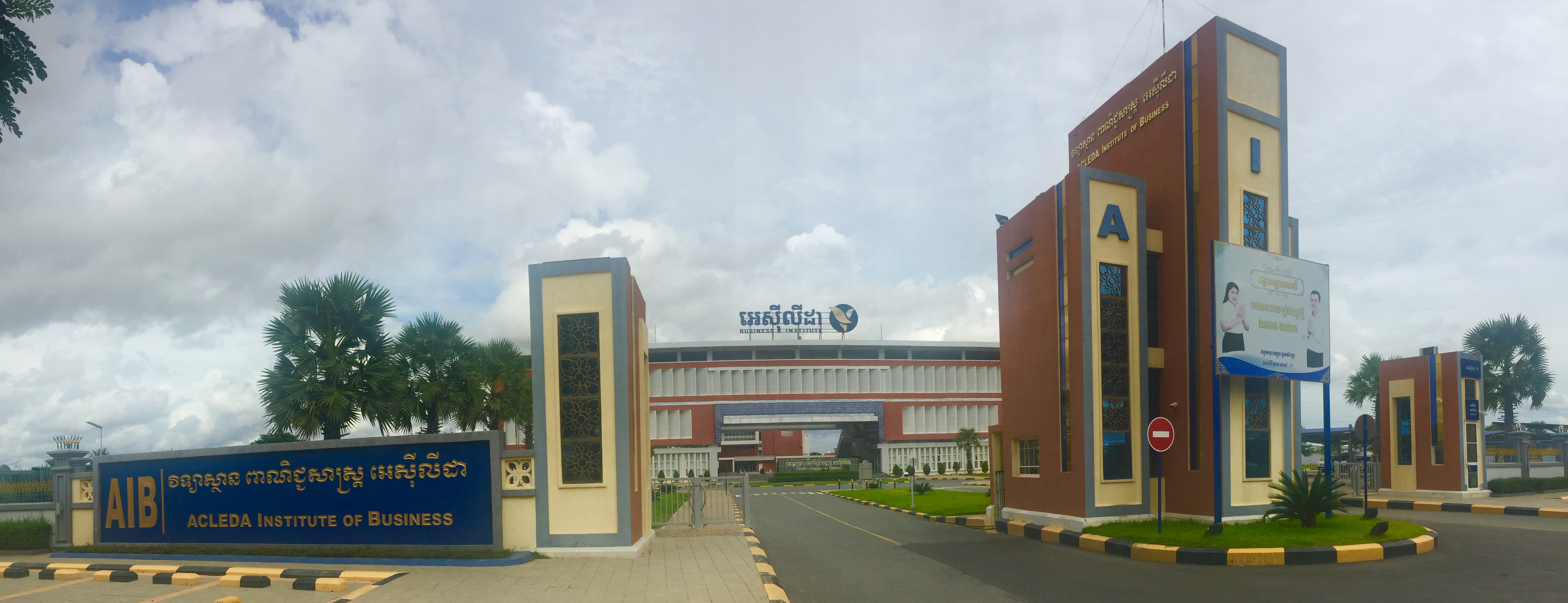
Panoramic view of the campus.

The AIB campus sits on 7.57 hectares and consists of six buildings: a canteen, a bookstore, a library, a football field, volleyball and basketball courts and other facilities. The institute with built with a capacity for accommodating 627 employees and 2,866 students per academic term.

The campus was built as a green building. Cored bricks with plaster are used on both sides for internal and external walls. Low-flow faucets and a black water treatment recycle water. The campus received final certification for Excellence in Design for Greater Efficiencies (EDGE).

== Recognition ==
ACLEDA Institute of Business is a higher education institution officially registered and recognized by the Royal Government of Cambodia.

The ACLEDA Institute of Business was encouraged by the Minister of Economy, Aun Pornmoniroth, to help Cambodia "increase and develop the human resource capacity and professional training" in the fields of accounting, banking and finance.
