= Compañía Nacional de Chocolates de Perú S.A. =

Peruvian chocolate company

- Type: Subsidiary
- Industry: Food processing
- Founded: February 1, 2007
- Headquarters: Av. Maquinarias 2360, Lima, Peru, Lima, Peru
- Area served: Peru
- Products: Winter's, Chocopunch
- Owner: Grupo Empresarial Antioqueño
- Number of employees: 670
- Parent: Grupo Nutresa
- Website: www.chocolates.com.pe

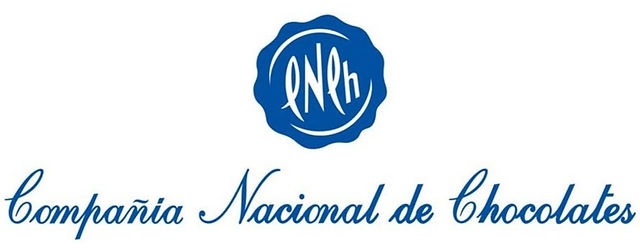

Compañía Nacional de Chocolates de Perú S.A. (English: National Chocolates Company of Peru) is a food and beverage company headquartered in Lima, Peru. Compañía Nacional de Chocolates de Perú S.A. was incorporated February 1, 2007 as a subsidiary of the parent company Grupo Nutresa S.A. owned by Colombian conglomerate Grupo Empresarial Antioqueño.

== Winter's brand ==
Winter's is a popular Peruvian brand of chocolates and other food products owned by Compañía Nacional de Chocolates de Perú S.A. The Winter's brand was started in 1997 by Lima-based Good Foods S.A., the largest Peruvian exporter of chocolates. On February 1, 2007, Colombian-based food conglomerate Grupo Nacional de Chocolates (now Grupo Nutresa) purchased Good Foods S.A. and its Winter's brand for US$36 million through its Peruvian subsidiary Compañía Nacional de Chocolates de Perú S.A. Winter's has more than forty brands in its portfolio of products: cocoas, milk modifiers, chocolates, cookies, candies, gums, lozenges, chewing gum, icings, cream confections, marshmallows, and panettone.

== See also ==
- Chocopunch — company product.
- Winter's — primary line of products.
