= Citibank Thailand =

Citibank Thailand is the Thai section of the Citigroup financial services group, established in 1985.

== History ==
Citi started operations in Thailand as early as 1967, when it began with a 50% equity stake in the Bangkok First Investment Trust. In 1989 the First National City Finance was initiated. Later in 1984, Citibank Thailand obtained a full banking licence when it acquired the Mercantile Bank. On November 1, 1985, Citibank was formally registered in Thailand.

== Company profile ==
With an employee strength of over 2600, Citibank Thailand has grown to serve more than a million customers countrywide. Their Financial Statements show that Citibank is currently the largest foreign bank in Thailand when measured by deposits and assets. Currently, the head office of Citibank Thailand is located on Sukhumvit Road, and it operates under the name of Citibank, N.A.

== Timeline ==
1982 - Citigroup acquires the Diners Club franchise, including Diners Club (Thailand) Ltd.
1984 - Citibank acquires the Thailand branch of Mercantile Bank.
1985 - Citibank opens its first Citibank Bangkok Branch.
1986 - CitiCapital Ltd. set up to provide investment and venture capital and corporate finance advisory.
1987 – Establishment of Citicorp Leasing (Thailand) Ltd., in the consumer finance business.
. Now operates over 45 branches across Thailand under the Citiadvance brand with a market leadership position. 2000 - Citicorp Securities (Thailand) Ltd receives a license to undertake securities business.
2008 - Citi Thailand named the Best Foreign Commercial Bank in the country by FinanceAsia.
2008- Citi Thailand named best Corporate/Institutional Internet Bank and Best Consumer Internet Bank by Global Finance magazine
2008 - Citi Thailand voted best Foreign Cash Management Bank by Asiamoney's Regional Cash Management Poll
2008 - Citi Thailand named best Corporate/institutional Internet Bank in Thailand by Global Finance
2008 - Best Overall Domestic Cash Management Services for small, medium and large corporations
2008 - Best Overall Cross-Border Cash Management Services for small, medium and large corporations.
2008 - Best International Trade Bank in Thailand.

== Products and services ==
Citibank Thailand offers services to individual consumers and business houses on investment and private banking. Their major offerings to business houses include foreign exchange, trade finance, cash management, custodian services, lending, securitization, and capital markets.

== Key people ==
Darren Buckley, Country Head & Citi Country Officer, Citibank, N.A.

== Sponsorship and CSR ==
Citi Thailand follows key priorities of Citi's Citizenship namely Microfinance, Environment, Financial Education, Youth Education, Disaster Response and Workplace. Up to 2007, Thailand received grant support from Citi Foundation worth US$1,364,008 (approximately 53.5 million baht) contributing to various community development programs. Since 2006, hundreds of employees plus families and friends have participated in Citi's annual "Global Community Day".
