= Busan Bank =

South Korean bank

BNK Busan Bank

- Busan Bank Headquarters
- Company type: Subsidiary
- Industry: Banking
- Founded: 1967; 59 years ago
- Headquarters: Busan, South Korea
- Key people: Sungbin Bang (CEO)
- Products: Financial services
- Number of employees: 3,398
- Parent: BNK Financial Group
- Website: busanbank.co.kr

Busan Bank (Korean: 부산은행; Hanja: 釜山銀行) is a regional bank in South Korea. The company was established in 1967 to facilitate the regional economy. The bank is based and headquartered in the busy port city of Busan, South Korea, and offers a full range of retail banking services including foreign exchange at its Seomyeon main branch. The bank has 229 branches in Korea. Its main shareholders include Aberdeen Asset Management Asia Ltd., Lotte group, National Pension Service, Capital Research & Global Investors, Parkland, Templeton, etc.

== History ==
- October 1967: Established
- June 1972: Listed on the stock exchange
- June 1982: Headquarters relocated to Beomil-Dong, Dong-Gu, Busan
- June 1997: Bu-eun Seonmul (BNK Securities) established
- November 2000: Became a municipal bank
- January 2009: Busan Bank CI changed, so "Pusan Bank" became "Busan Bank"
- March 2011: BS Financial Group (currently BNK Financial Group) launched
- October 2014: Headquarters relocated to Munhyeon-Dong, Nam-Gu, Busan
- March 2015: BNK Busan Bank CI changed
- April 2020: Busan local currency membership program launched (Busan BC Checkcard)

== Branches ==
=== Domestic Branches ===
Number of Branches and Sales Offices: 229

=== International Branches ===
China - Qingdao Branch, Nanjing Branch

Vietnam - Ho Chi Minh Branch, Hanoi Office

Myanmar - Yangon Office

India - Mumbai Office

== Card Services ==
Busan Bank is a member of the BC Card Network.

In 2016, Busan Bank promoted a partnership with Lotte Card. A SUM bank affiliated Lotte Card (credit/check card) was released at the launch of SUM bank, and applications could only be applied through the SUM bank app, but all SUM bank affiliated Lotte Cards were discontinued on March 1, 2020. On February 24, 2020, SUM bank BC Master credit/check card was released, and unlike SUM bank Lotte Card, it is possible to apply for it through Busan Bank internet banking and the banking app, and it can be connected to the customer's Busan Bank account in addition to the SUM bank mobile bank book.

== Credit/Check Card Types ==
- BC Card (currently available)
  - BC (Domestic use only), BC Visa Card (Credit), MasterCard (Other than BNK Friends and SUM bank BC, all cards are issued as credit cards), JCB, China UnionPay, BC Global

== Bank President History ==
- Sim Hun (2000~2006)
- Lee Jangho (2006~2012)
- Sung Sehwan (2012~2017)
- Bin Daein (2017~2021)
- Ahn KamChan (2021~2023)
- Bang Sungbin (2023~)

== Special Features ==
Lotte Group owns 13.6% of the BNK Financial Group's stake and is in partnership with Lotte PS Net. Customers can use Lotte ATMs installed nationwide at 7-Eleven, Lotte Mart, Lotte Department Stores by paying only Busan Bank's commission.

After BS Financial Group took over Kyongnam Bank in October 2014, Kyongnam Bank can also be used at Lotte ATMs located at South Gyeongsang Province and Ulsan Metropolitan City starting from January 18, 2016.

Busan Bank launched fintech mobile non-face-to-face financial service, SUM bank, a joint venture with Lotte Group. SUM bank mobile bank book can only be signed up using SUM bank app. SUM bank used to only provide affiliated Lotte Cards, but it added BC Cards in February 2020. The existing SUM bank Lotte Cards were discontinued on March 1, 2020. There is no issuance fee for the SUM bank affiliated BC Check Card.

In 2016, Busan Bank introduced a smart ATM.

== Foreign Exchange ==
Customers signed up for Busan Bank Internet Banking can exchange currencies listed below:

- United States dollar
- Japan yen
- EU euro
- China yuan

Currency exchange ATMs are also available at Busan Port Passenger Terminal branch (JPY) and Gimhae International Airport branch (USD/JPY) all year round, but limited to USD and JPY.

== See also ==
- List of Banks in South Korea
- Air Busan - Busan Bank helper and investors
