= ACLEDA Bank =

Bank in Cambodia

ACLEDA Bank Plc.
- Native name: ធនាគារ អេស៊ីលីដា ភីអិលស៊ី
- Type: Private
- Industry: Banking, finance
- Founded: January 1993; 33 years ago
- Headquarters: Phnom Penh, Cambodia
- Area served: Nationwide, Laos, Myanmar
- Key people: In Channy (President & GMD); So Phonnary (EVP & GCOO); Ma Amara (EVP & GCFO); Chhay Soeun (Chairman)
- Products: Financial services
- Number of employees: 11,926
- Website: www.acledabank.com.kh

ACLEDA Bank Plc. (/ˌeɪsiːˈliːdə/; Khmer: ធនាគារ អេស៊ីលីដា ភីអិលស៊ី, Thônéakéar Ésilida Phi'ĕlsi) is a Cambodian commercial bank. Based in Phnom Penh, ACLEDA Bank also operates in Laos and Myanmar. ACLEDA started out in 1993 when it began providing micro credits to war victims. By now it is Cambodia's major commercial bank. ACLEDA had more than $5,244 million in total assets as of December 31, 2017, and more than $3,117 million in deposits, with over $3,085 million in loans outstanding. According to the National Bank of Cambodia, ACLEDA Bank is the largest domestic commercial bank in terms of total assets and number of clients, with more than 1.7 million depositors as of December 31, 2017.

The bank is headed by president and GMD, In Channy, who is one of the original 28 members of the organization. Channy joined the company in 1992 as a loan officer while the bank was still a UN-funded microfinance project. He is chief executive officer of the company, and vice-chairman of the International Business Chamber of Cambodia.

ACLEDA is an acronym for the Association of Cambodian Local Economic Development Agencies (Khmer: សមាគមទីភ្នាក់ងារអភិវឌ្ឍន៍សេដ្ឋកិច្ចក្នុងស្រុកកម្ពុជា).

== International expansion ==
In 2008, ACLEDA Bank expanded its business to Laos, becoming the first Cambodian bank to begin operations in the country. As of December 31, 2017, ACLEDA managed 42 branches in Laos. As of December 31, 2017, ACLEDA manages 42 branches within Laos. Following the lifting of international sanctions on Myanmar in early 2012, the bank applied for a micro-finance license in Myanmar in June of that year with the plan of providing deposit accounts and money transfers via micro-finance services. The Burmese subsidiary was opened in 2013, and operated seven offices in the Yangon and Bago regions.

== ACLEDA Securities PLC. ==
ACLEDA Securities Plc. is a brokerage firm registered, as a public limited corporation, under the law of the Kingdom of Cambodia, authorized by the National Bank of Cambodia and licensed by the Securities and Exchange Commission of Cambodia (SECC) to provide services as a securities' brokerage business to individual and institutional customers, investors and the public.

During the IPO of PPWSA in March 2012, Cambodia's first IPO on the Cambodian Stock Exchange (CSX), ACLEDA Securities provided market access to investors wishing to participate in the stock exchange through 21 of the bank's branches around Cambodia.

== Shareholders ==
ACLEDA Bank Plc. is 51% owned by Cambodian interests, including its staff, with the remaining 49% taken up in equal parts by Sumitomo Mitsui Banking Corporation, COFIBRED (Compagnie Financière de la BRED — a BRED Banque Populaire's fully owned subsidiary), ORIX Corporation, and the three investment funds (Triodos-Doen Foundation, Triodos Fair Share Fund, and Triodos Microfinance Fund) managed by Triodos Investment Management.

Its current shareholders as at June 19, 2019.

Shareholder	Number of Shares	Subscription Price (US$)	Ownership (%)
ACLEDA Financial Trust	111,492,719	$111,492,719	26.00%
ASA, Plc.	107,204,547	$107,204,547	25.00%
Sumitomo Mitsui Banking Corporation	78,259,310	$78,259,310	18.25%
COFIBRED	52,530,223	$52,530,223	12.25%
ORIX Corporation	52,530,223	$52,530,223	12.25%
Triodos Microfinance Fund	10,938,339	$10,938,339	2.55%
Triodos Fair Share Fund	9,354,157	$9,354,157	2.18%
Triodos Sustainable Finance Foundation	6,508,636	$6,508,636	1.52%
Total	428,818,154	$428,818,154	100.00%

== ACLEDA Staff Association (ASA) ==
ASA is a holding company through which the employees of ACLEDA and certain other investors can participate in the long-term growth and value appreciation of ACLEDA. ASA holds as its principal asset 98,806,034 shares of ACLEDA, which represents 25% of the bank's issued shares. On March 1, 2010, the Leopard Cambodia Fund, Cambodia's first private equity fund operated by frontier markets private equity firm Leopard Capital, in partnership with two other foreign investors, acquired a 7.72% stake in ASA, Plc.

== Ratings ==
ACLEDA Bank is the first bank in Cambodia to have been assigned ratings by the top international credit rating agency — Standard & Poor's.

On 25 September 2025, Standard & Poor's maintained ACLEDA Bank's issuer credit rating at B+/Stable/B.

Category	Rating
ACLEDA Bank Plc	
Issuer Credit Rating	B+/Stable/B
Stand-Alone Credit Profile (SACP)	bb

== See also ==
- ACLEDA Institute of Business
