= IM Financial Group =

South Korean financial services company

IM Financial Group Co., Ltd.
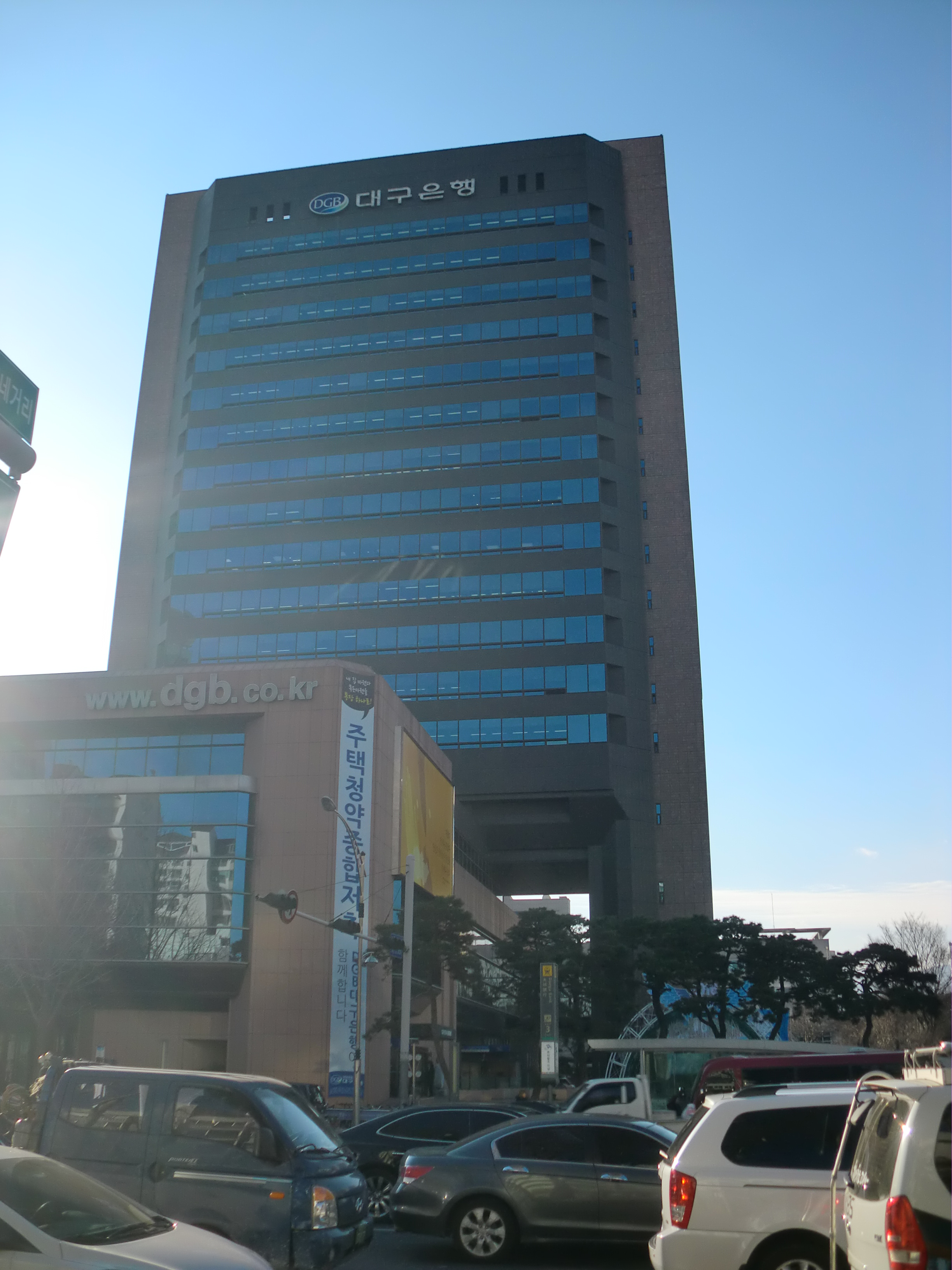
- Native name: 주식회사 IM금융지주
- Formerly: daegu bank(大邱銀行)
- Type: Public
- Traded as: KRX: 139130
- Industry: Financial services
- Founded: May 17, 2011; 15 years ago
- Headquarters: Daegu, South Korea
- Subsidiaries: IM Bank
- Website: www.imfngroup.com

IM Financial Group Co., Ltd. (IMFG; Korean: 주식회사 IM금융지주) is financial holding company headquartered in Daegu, South Korea. Its flagship company, IM Bank, is one of the largest regional banks in the country, mostly serving customers in the Daegu-Gyeongbuk region.

The group was founded on May 17, 2011 as DGB Financial Group, upon the Financial Supervisory Service's approval for the establishment of a financial holding company for Daegu Bank and its two arms, Daegu Credit Information and Kardnet (which later became DGB U-Pay). After the establishment, DGB acquired Woori Aviva Life Insurance from Nonghyup Financial Group in 2015 and took over HI Investment & Securities from Hyundai Heavy Industries Group in 2018. DGB then changed its name to IM Financial Group effective March 26, 2025.

== See also ==
- List of banks in South Korea
- Daegu
- Gyeongbuk
- DGB Daegu Bank Park
