= Grupo Nutresa =

Colombian food processing company

Grupo Nutresa S.A.
- Formerly: Compañía Nacional de Chocolates S.A. (1920–2003); Inversiones Nacional de Chocolates S.A. (2003–2006); Grupo Nacional de Chocolates S.A. (2006–2011)
- Type: Public
- Traded as: BVC: NUTRESA
- Industry: Food processing
- Founded: April 12, 1920; 106 years ago
- Headquarters: Medellín, Colombia
- Area served: Worldwide
- Key people: Carlos Ignacio Gallego (chairman & CEO)
- Products: Coffee; Chocolate; Ice cream Pasta; Biscuits; Processed meats
- Revenue: ▲US$3.1 billion (2020)
- Net income: ▲US$956.2 million (2012)
- Number of employees: 45,803
- Parent: Gilinski Group (87%)
- Subsidiaries: Compañía Nacional de Chocolates; Oriental Coffee Alliance (Malaysia); AbiMar Foods; Kibo Foods; Galletas NOEL; Galletas Pozuelo; Alimentos Zenú; Alicapsa; TMLUC; Meals de Colombia; Setas de Colombia; Colcafé; Pastas Doria
- Website: www.gruponutresa.com/en

Grupo Nutresa S.A. (in English: Nutresa Group), formerly Grupo Nacional de Chocolates S.A. (in English: Chocolate National Group S.A.), is a Colombian multinational food processing conglomerate headquartered in Medellín.

The group's principal activities are producing, distributing, and selling cold cuts, biscuits, chocolates, coffee, ice cream and pasta. The company markets its products under approximately 70 different brands in 65 countries. Other activities include the investment or application of resources or cash under whatever form authorized by law and the exploration of the metal-mechanic and packaging industry.

In 2004, the group began their international expansion, acquiring several companies in Central America and the Caribbean. By 2008, the Compañía Nacional de Chocolates continued expanding and consolidating its presence in the region. The market value of the company grew by a factor of 25 in the decade leading up to 2010 (to US$6 billion). Though originally a chocolatier, the sale of chocolates contributed only 19% to sales in 2010.

== Company history ==
=== Formation of the group ===
In 1896, Fábrica de Galletas y Confites—a company making biscuits (cookies and crackers) and confectionery—was set up in Medellin, Colombia. In 1925, the company changed its name to Fábrica de Galletas Noel S.A. and again in 1999, to Compañía de Galletas Noel S.A. In 1920, a chocolate-processing company under the name of Compañía Nacional de Chocolates Cruz Roja was founded and later changed its name to Compañía Nacional de Chocolates, S.A. In 1933, this chocolate company bought an interest in the biscuit company paving the way for the formation of the conglomerate. From 1933 to 1958, the group continued to consolidate its distribution network resulting in strengthened national presence and corporate image.

=== In the business of coffee ===
In 1933, the "Sello Rojo" (Red Label) brand was created when the company entered the coffee business. In 1950, with the boom of the coffee industry, Compañía Colombiana de Café S.A.- Colcafé, was created and soon become an important Colombian export company. The first export of any company of the group was in 1961 — coffee to Japan.

=== International expansion ===
In 1993, the confectionery company, Compañía Dulces de Colombia S.A. was set up. In 1995, the organization's trading companies were established abroad forming what is known today as the Cordialsa network, first in Ecuador and second in Venezuela. The company also made its first investment abroad and expanded its meat-processing business with Industrias Alimenticias Hermo de Venezuela S.A. In 1999, the organization spun off two of its companies, Noel and Zenú.

In 2003, the holding company Inversiones Nacional de Chocolates S.A. came into being, with important interests in chocolate and coffee businesses as well as the organization's food investment company Inveralimenticias (which has holdings in the meat, cookie and confectionery business). In 2004, the organization began expanding into Central America and the Caribbean through the purchase of Nestle's cookie and chocolate plants in Costa Rica. In 2006, the organization changed its name to Grupo Nacional de Chocolates S.A. On 1 February 2007, Grupo Nacional de Chocolates purchased Peruvian company Good Foods S.A. and the Winter's brand for US$36 million through its Peruvian subsidiary Compañía Nacional de Chocolates de Perú S.A. In 2008, international acquisitions were concentrated in the meat market with the purchase of Ernesto Berard S.A. in Panama, joining the already acquired Blue Ribbon Products, which would merge in 2011, and give rise to Alicapsa-Alimentos Cárnicos Panamá. In October 2010, the company acquired US–based cookie manufacturer Fehr Foods, which was later renamed AbiMar Foods. In 2020, it announced its foray into South Africa with its products and the construction of its 48th production plant, in the city of Santa Marta, Colombia.

=== Image change ===
On 31 March 2011, the company changed its name to Grupo Nutresa in a move made to emphasize the diversity of its products that now includes pasta and cold cuts.

== Brands ==
- Colombia: Jet Chocolate, Jumbo, TOSH, Zenú, Ranchera, Saltín Noel, Ducales, Festival, Colcafé, Montblanc, Doria Pasta, Crem Helado, Cordillera.
- Peru: Winter's, Chin Chin, Picaras, Granuts, Chocolisto, Cordillera.
- Costa Rica: Tutto, Cocoa Dulce, TOSH, Cordillera.
- Dominican Republic: Corona, Chiky, Chocolisto, Colcafé, Cremino, Dux Biscuits, Ducales, Festival, Granuts, Helados Bon, Jet Chocolate, Jumbo, Livean, Muibon, Noel Biscuits, Nucita, Pozuelo, Saltín Noel, TOSH, Zuko.
- Mexico: Nucita, Cremino, Muibon.
- United States: Cameron's Coffee, Kibo Foods, Lil' Dutch Maid, Tru-Blu.
- Chile: Kryzpo, Muibon, TMLUC.
- Brazil: Biscoitos Dux

== See also ==
- Compañía Nacional de Chocolates de Perú S.A. – a Peruvian subsidiary of Grupo Nutresa S.A.
- Colombina - a competitor
