= Colombia Stock Exchange =

Stock exchange in Bogotá, Colombia

Coordinates: 04°39′14.92″N 74°03′21.23″W

Colombia Securities Exchange
- Bolsa de Valores de Colombia

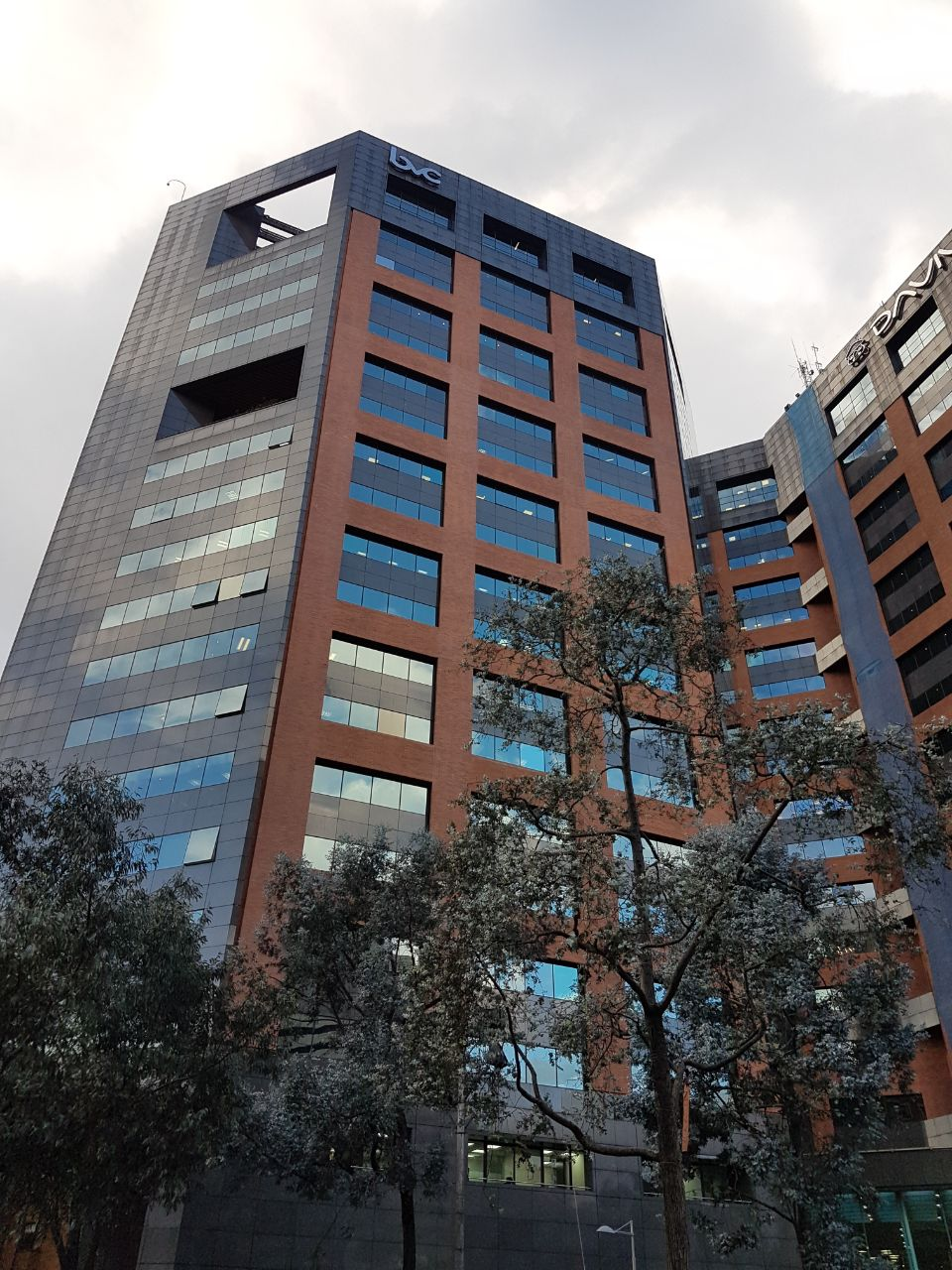
- Headquarters in Bogotá
- Type: Stock Exchange
- Location: Bogotá, Colombia
- Founded: November 23, 1928 (Bogotá Stock Exchange); July 3, 2001 (current form)
- Key people: Rafael Aparicio Escallon (Chairman) Juan Pablo Córdoba (CEO)
- Currency: Colombian peso
- No. of listings: 89
- Market cap: US$ 236 billion
- Indices: COLCAP
- Website: www.bvc.com.co

The Colombia Securities Exchange (Spanish: Bolsa de Valores de Colombia, bvc) is a stock exchange which was created as a result of merging three independent stock exchanges: Bogotá (Bolsa de Bogotá, 1928), Medellín (Bolsa de Medellín, 1961) and Occidente (Bolsa de Occidente, Cali, 1983). It has offices in Bogotá, Medellín and Cali. Furthermore, with the bvc Training Centers the company is located in 19 Colombian cities through agreements with universities and chambers of commerce.

As an infrastructure provider and securities issuer, the bvc is overseen by the Superintendencia Financiera de Colombia. Its main function is to be financing alternative for the productive system, through direct investment. The bvc does not have regulatory or oversight functions.

== History ==
The idea of a stock exchange in Colombia occurred originally in Medellín at the beginning of the 20th century with an initiative in 1901 and then in Bogotá in 1903 with an unsuccessful outcome. It was not only until the late 1920s when the political and socio-economic landscape seemed to give more opportunities of survival.

It was in mid-1928 when a group of entrepreneurs and government officials from Colombia and abroad organized the promotion of the Bogotá Stock Exchange (Sp. Bolsa de Bogotá) so they could establish the judicial and operational framework of the newly created organization. Former Minister of Economy and jurist Jorge Soto del Corral composed the regulations of the new entity and on November 23 of 1928 the public title 1702 was signed and constituted the Bogotá Stock Exchange as a public limited company. On May 6, 1929, the first board of trustees was elected.

In March 1929 the first 17 traders were assigned by Banking Superintendent Gonzalo Cordoba and on April 25 corporations and organizations registered their shares, this included banks, financial service companies and manufacturing and commercial services corporations. Among them Bank of Colombia currently branded as Bancolombia which is also a NYSE listed company and Scadta today known as Avianca.

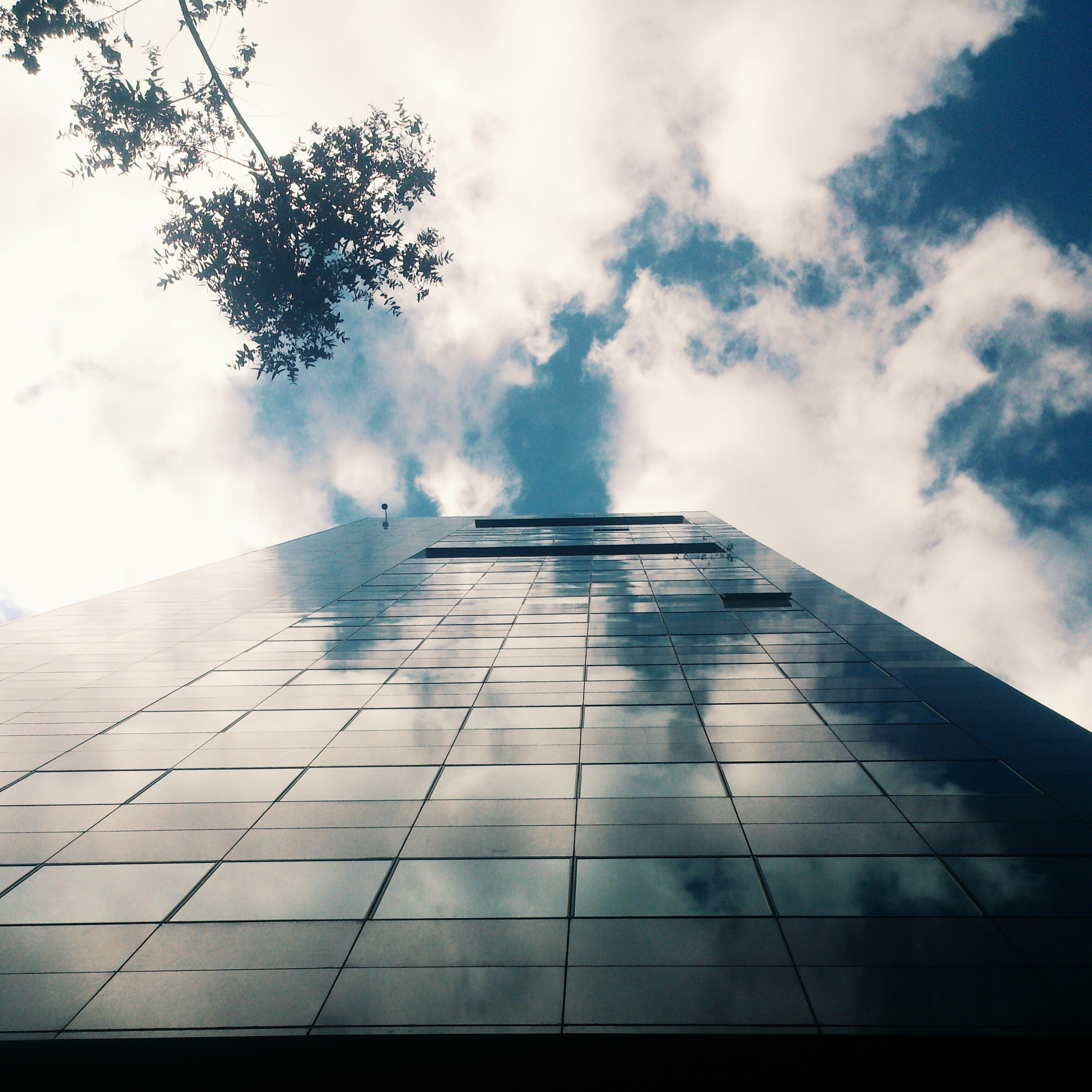
Colombia Securities Exchange Building

Bogotá Stock Exchange remained as Colombia's only stock trading organization until the 1950s when Medellín created its own Stock Exchange. This was particularly useful for the coffee trade since Colombia's coffee market's original birthplace is the Department of Antioquia. Cali created its stock exchange in the mid-1970s.

The main driving force of this stock exchanges was the economic growth it meant to their participants. However, the policy making of the original stock exchange and Colombia's Bank of the Republic (Similar to the United States Federal Reserve) was archaic for today's standards.

The evolution of the financial policies of the estate, the fundamental macroeconomic principles, the development of a financial system, the creation of entrepreneurial groups and the evolution of illegal drug trade and the violence it brought, were factors that decimated the share trading market of Colombia during the 1970s. Despite these problems and the original stock exchange losing its original mission of being a vehicle for the trading of shares, its executives pursued the improving of the credibility of Bolsa de Bogotá by concentrating in the operations between potential investors and shareholders.

During 2001 it became necessary to merge the three regional stock exchanges into what it is known today as Bolsa de Valores of Colombia (Stock Exchange of Colombia).

Another highlight was the start-up of the Integrated Latin American Market (MILA, in its Spanish acronym) on May 30, 2011. This was the result of an agreement signed between the Santiago Stock Exchange, the Colombia Securities Exchange, the Lima Stock Exchange and the Mexican Stock Exchange. At the same time, the Deceval, DCV and Cavali Central Securities Depositories were also set up to create a regional trading market for equity securities from the three MILA countries. [www.mercadomila.com] allows investors and brokers from Chile, Colombia, Mexico and Peru to buy and sell stocks from the three stock markets through a local broker since the start of MILA.

On July 22, 2014, the Colombia Securities Exchange (bvc) became the 11th stock exchange to join the United Nations' Sustainable Stock Exchanges initiative.

== Derivatives Market ==
In September 2008, bvc launched its listed Derivatives Market introducing a Notional Basket of Colombian Treasury Bonds.

== See also ==
- Economy of Colombia
- List of stock exchanges
- List of American stock exchanges
- List of Colombian companies
