= List of banks in the Americas =

This is a list of the banks in the Americas.

== Argentina ==
=== Central bank ===
- Central Bank of Argentina

=== Government-owned banks ===
- Banco de la Nación Argentina
- Bank of the Province of Buenos Aires
- Bank of the City of Buenos Aires
- Banco Patagonia
- Banco Santiago del Estero

=== Commercial banks ===
- Grupo Financiero Galicia
- Banco Santander Argentina
- Banco Macro
- BBVA Argentina
- Banco Credicoop
- Citibank Argentina
- Banco Hipotecario
- New Bank of Santa Fe
- Municipal Bank of Rosario

== Bahamas ==
=== Central bank ===
- Central Bank of The Bahamas

=== Government-owned banks ===
- Bank of The Bahamas International
- Commonwealth Bank of Bahamas

=== Commercial banks ===
- Citibank
- Fidelity Bank
- Finance Corporation of The Bahamas
- CIBC Caribbean
- Royal Bank of Canada
- Scotiabank

== Barbados ==
=== Central bank ===
- Central Bank of Barbados

=== Commercial banks ===
- CIBC Caribbean
- First Citizens
  - RBTT Bank Barbados limited; subsidiary of RBTT Financial Holdings Limited (RBTT)
- RBC Financial Caribbean; branch of Royal Bank of Canada (RBC)
- Scotiabank

=== Development banks ===
- African Export–Import Bank (Afreximbank)
- Caribbean Development Bank (CDB)

== Belize ==
=== Central bank ===
- Central Bank of Belize

=== Development bank ===
- National Bank of Belize Limited

=== Major privately owned banks ===
- Belize Bank Ltd.
- Heritage Bank Limited
- Atlantic Bank Limited

== Bermuda ==
- The Bank of N. T. Butterfield & Son Limited
- HSBC Bank of Bermuda Limited
- Bermuda Commercial Bank Limited
- Clarien Bank

== Bolivia ==
=== Central bank ===
- Central Bank of Bolivia

=== Law-recognized state banks ===
- Banco Unión

=== Second-floor banks ===
- Banco de Desarrollo Productivo

=== Multiple banks ===
- Banco Mercantil Santa Cruz
- Banco Nacional de Bolivia
- Banco BISA
- Banco de Crédito BCP
- Banco FIE
- BancoSol
- Banco Ganadero
- Banco Económico
- Banco Prodem
- Banco Fortaleza

=== Small and Medium Enterprise-focused Banks ===
- Banco PyME Ecofuturo
- Bancomunidad

=== Foreign banks ===
- Banco de la Nación Argentina

=== Defunct banks ===
- Banco Agrícola de Bolivia
- Banco Boliviano Americano
- Banco de Credito Oruro
- Banco de Cochabamba
- Banco de Financiamiento Industrial
- Banco de La Paz
- Banco de la Vivienda
- Banco de Potosí
- Banco de San Carlos
- Banco del Progreso
- Banco Fassil
- Banco Intenacional de Desarrollo
- Banco Minero de Bolivia
- Banco PyME Los Andes ProCredit
- Banco Santa Cruz
- Banco Sur
- BHN Multibanco
- Citibank

== Brazil ==
The banking sector in Brazil is one of the largest in Latin America, with total assets exceeding R$17 trillion as of 2025. The market is highly concentrated, with the five largest banks — Banco do Brasil, Caixa Econômica Federal, Itaú Unibanco, Bradesco, and Santander Brasil — accounting for more than half of total banking assets.

=== Central bank ===
- Central Bank of Brazil

=== Development banks ===
- National Bank for Economic and Social Development (BNDES) (Federal Government-owned)
- Espírito Santo Development Bank (BANDES) (State of Espírito Santo-owned)
- Minas Gerais Development Bank (BDMG) (State of Minas Gerais-owned)
- Far South Regional Development Bank (BRDE) (States of Paraná, Santa Catarina and Rio Grande do Sul-owned)

=== Major commercial banks ===
==== Government-owned banks ====
- Banco do Brasil (Federal Government as main shareholder)
- Caixa Econômica Federal (Federal Government-owned)

==== Private-owned banks ====
- Itaú Unibanco
- Banco Bradesco
- Banco Santander Brasil; (owned by Spanish Banco Santander)

=== Other commercial banks ===
==== Government-owned banks ====
- Banco da Amazônia (Federal Government as main shareholder)
- Banco de Brasília (BRB) (Federal District-owned)
- Banco do Estado do Espírito Santo (Banestes) (State of Espírito Santo-owned)
- Banco do Estado do Pará (Banpará) (State of Pará-owned)
- Banco do Estado do Rio Grande do Sul (Banrisul) (State of Rio Grande do Sul-owned)
- Banco do Estado do Sergipe (Banese) (State of Sergipe-owned)
- Banco do Nordeste (Federal Government as main shareholder)

==== Private-owned banks ====
- Banco BBM (China's Bank of Communications as main shareholder)
- Banco BMG
- Banco Daycoval S.A.
- Banco BV (co-owned by Votorantim Group and Banco do Brasil)
- Banco Fibra
- Banco Industrial do Brasil
- Banco Mercantil do Brasil
- Banco PAN (formerly Banco Panamericano, now owned by BTG Pactual)
- Paraná Banco
- Banco Paulista
- Banco Safra
- Banco Sofisa

==== Online banks ====
- Agibank
- Banco Bari
- Banco BS2
- C6 Bank
- Banco Digimais
- Banco Digio
- Banco Inter
- Nubank
- RecargaPay
- Banco Original
- PicPay

==== Cooperative banks ====
- Sistema de Cooperativas de Crédito do Brasil (Bancoob)
- Ailos - Sistema de Cooperativas (Ailos)
- Sistema de Cooperativas de Crédito do Brasil (Sicoob)
- Sistema de Crédito Cooperativo (Sicredi)
- Unicred
- Cresol

=== Investment banks ===
- Banco BTG Pactual (private)
- XP Investimentos (private)
- NuInvest (private)
- Genial Investimentos (private)
- Banco Clássico (private)
- Banco Modal (private)

=== Merged or defunct banks ===
- Banco Alfa; acquired by Banco Safra
- Banco Bamerindus; acquired by HSBC Bank (Brazil), now Banco Bradesco
- Banco Bandeirantes; acquired by Caixa Geral de Depósitos, later merged with Unibanco, now Banco Itaú
- BankBoston Brasil; Brazilian operations acquired by Banco Itaú
- Banorte; acquired by Banco Bandeirantes, later merged with Unibanco, now Banco Itaú
- BBVA Brasil; Brazilian operations acquired by Banco Bradesco
- Banco Boavista; acquired by Banco Bradesco
- Citibank Brasil; Brazilian operations acquired by Banco Itaú
- Banco Credireal; acquired by BCN, now Banco Bradesco
- Banco de Crédito Nacional (BCN); acquired by Banco Bradesco
- Banco Econômico; merged with Banco Excel, later acquired by BBVA Brasil, now Banco Bradesco
- Banco do Estado do Amazonas (BEA); acquired by Banco Bradesco
- Banco do Estado da Bahia (Baneb); acquired by Banco Bradesco
- Banco do Estado do Ceará (BEC); acquired by Banco Bradesco
- Banco do Estado de Goiás (BEG); acquired by Banco Itaú
- Banco do Estado do Maranhão (BEM); acquired by Banco Bradesco
- Banco do Estado de Minas Gerais (Bemge); acquired by Banco Itaú
- Banco do Estado da Paraíba (Paraiban); acquired by Banco Real, now Santander Brasil
- Banco do Estado do Paraná (Banestado); acquired by Banco Itaú
- Banco do Estado de Pernambuco (Bandepe); acquired by Banco Real, now Santander Brasil
- Banco do Estado do Piauí (BEP); acquired by Banco do Brasil
- Banco do Estado do Rio de Janeiro (Banerj); acquired by Banco Itaú
- Banco do Estado de Santa Catarina (BESC); acquired by Banco do Brasil
- Banco do Estado de São Paulo (Banespa); acquired by Santander Brasil
- HSBC Bank (Brazil); Brazilian operations acquired by Banco Bradesco
- Banco Mercantil Finasa; acquired by Banco Bradesco
- Banco Meridional; acquired by Banco Bozano Simonsen, later merged with Santander Brasil
- Banco Nacional; acquired by Unibanco, now Banco Itaú
- Banco Noroeste; acquired by Santander Brasil
- Banco Nossa Caixa; acquired by Banco do Brasil
- Banco Real; formerly owned by ABN AMRO, later merged with Santander Brasil
- Banco Sudameris; acquired by Banco Real, now Santander Brasil
- Unibanco; merged with Banco Itaú

== Chile ==
=== Central bank ===
- Central Bank of Chile

=== Government-owned banks ===
- Banco del Estado de Chile

=== Commercial banks ===
- Banco de Crédito e Inversiones
- Banco de Chile
  - Banco Edwards Citi
- Banco Consorcio
- Banco BICE
- Banco Security
- Banco Falabella
- Banco Internacional (Chile)
- Banco Ripley

==== Foreign-owned ====
- Banco Santander (Chile) (owned by Banco Santander)
- Itaú (Chile) (56,6% owned by Itaú Unibanco)
- Scotiabank (Chile) (owned by Scotiabank)

==== Neobanks ====
- Tenpo
- Tanner Banco Digital

=== Enterprise banks ===
- Citibank Chile

=== Foreign banks with representation ===
- Banco de la Nación Argentina
- Banco do Brasil
- DnB NOR Bank ASA
- JP Morgan Chase Bank
- The Bank of Tokyo-Mitsubishi UFJ

=== Merged or defunct banks ===
==== Commercial banks ====
- Banco de A. Edwards; merged with Banco de Chile.
- BBVA (Chile); merged with Scotiabank Chile.
- Banco Desarrollo de Scotiabank; merged with Scotiabank Chile.
- Banco de Santiago; merged with Banco Santander, some assets sold to Paris.
- Banco Sud Americano; bought by Scotiabank Chile.
- Banco Paris; closed in 2016.
- Banco Penta; assets sold to Banco de Chile.
- BankBoston; Chilean operations bought by Banco Itaú.
- Corpbanca; merged with Banco Itaú Chile.
- HSBC Bank Chile; operations merged with Banco de Chile.
- Rabobank; dissolved in 2017, banking assets sold to Banco BICE.

==== Enterprise banks ====
- Deutsche Bank; left the Chilean market in 2016.

== Colombia ==
=== Central bank ===
- Banco de la República

=== Second floor ===
- Bancóldex

=== Commercial banks ===
- Bancolombia
- Davivienda
- Nubank
- Banco de Bogotá
- BBVA Colombia
- Banco de Occidente Credencial
- GNB Sudameris
- Colpatria
- Itaú Colombia
- Banco Popular (Colombia)
- Banco Caja Social
- Banco AV Villas
- Bancoomeva
- Banco Finandina
- Banco Mundo Mujer
- Banco Pichincha
- Banco W
- Bancamía

=== Government-owned banks ===
- Banco Agrario de Colombia

=== Defunct banks ===
- Granahorrar Bank
- Citibank assets sold to Scotiabank.

== Costa Rica ==
=== Central bank ===
- Banco Central de Costa Rica

=== Government-owned banks ===
- Banco de Costa Rica
- Banco Nacional de Costa Rica
- Banco Popular (Costa Rica)

=== Commercial banks ===
- BAC Credomatic
- Banco BCT
- Banco Cathay de Costa Rica
- Banco CMB
- Davivienda
- Banco General (Panamá)
- Banco Improsa
- Banco Lafise
- Prival Bank
- Grupo Promerica
- Scotiabank

=== Defunct banks ===
- Banco Crédito Agrícola de Cartago merged to Banco de Costa Rica

== Cuba ==
=== Central bank ===
- Central Bank of Cuba

=== Commercial banks ===
- Banco de Crédito y Comercio
- Banco de Inversiones
- Banco Exterior de Cuba
- Banco Financiero Internacional
- Banco Industrial de Venezuela-Cuba
- Banco Internacional de Comercio
- Banco Metropolitano
- Banco Nacional de Cuba
- Banco Popular de Ahorro

== Dominica ==
=== Commercial banks ===
- National Bank of Dominica (NBD)

=== Branches of foreign banks ===
- Republic Bank

=== Foreign-owned banks ===
- CIBC Caribbean

=== Offshore banks ===
- Griffon Bank

== Dominican Republic ==
=== Central bank ===
- Central Bank of the Dominican Republic

=== Government-owned banks ===
- Banreservas

=== Major banks ===
- Banco Popular
- Banco BHD
- Scotiabank
- Grupo Promerica
- Banesco

== Ecuador ==
=== Central bank ===
- Central Bank of Ecuador

=== Government-owned banks ===
- Banco de Desarrollo del Ecuador
- BanEcuador
- Banco Ecuatoriano de Seguridad Social

=== Major banks ===
- Banco Pichincha
- Produbanco
- Banco de Guayaquil
- Banco del Pacífico
- Banco Bolivariano
- Banco Internacional
- Banco del Austro
- Banco de Machala

== El Salvador ==
=== Central bank ===
- Central Reserve Bank of El Salvador

=== Major banks ===
- Banco Agricola
- Banco Azul
- Banco Davivienda El Salvador
- Banco Cuscatlán
- Banco Hipotecario de El Salvador

== Grenada ==
=== Commercial banks ===
- Grenada Co-operative Bank (only locally owned bank)

=== Branches of foreign banks ===
- Scotiabank
- RBTT Bank Grenada Limited
- Republic Bank(Grenada) Limited

=== Foreign-owned banks ===
- CIBC Caribbean

== Guatemala ==
=== Central bank ===
- Bank of Guatemala

=== Commercial banks ===
- Banco Industrial Guatemala
- Banrural
- Banco G&T Continental
- Banco Agromercantil
- BANTRAB

== Guyana ==
=== Central Bank ===
- Bank of Guyana

=== Commercial banks ===
- Republic Bank (Guyana) (Subsidiary of Republic Bank)
- Guyana Bank for Trade & Industry Ltd. (GBTI)
- Demerara Bank Ltd.
- Citizen's Bank Guyana Inc.

=== Foreign-owned banks ===
- Bank of Baroda

== Honduras ==
=== Central bank ===
- Central Bank of Honduras

=== Government-owned banks ===
- Banadesa

=== Banks ===
- Banco Atlántida
- Banco Ficohsa
- Banco de Occidente
- BAC Credomatic
- Grupo Promerica
- Banco de Los Trabajadores

=== Foreign Banks ===
- Banco Azteca
- Davivienda

== Jamaica ==
=== Central bank ===
- The Bank of Jamaica

=== Commercial banks ===
==== Locally owned banks ====
- First Global Bank (Parent -Grace Kennedy)
- National Commercial Bank (NCB)
- Jamaica Money Market Brokers (JMMB)
- Sagicor Bank

==== Subsidiary/branch of foreign entity ====
- The Bank of Nova Scotia (Parent - Scotia Bank)
- Citibank Jamaica (Parent - Citibank)
- CIBC Caribbean (Parent - CIBC)
- National Commercial of Jamaica (Parent -Portland Holdings)

=== Merchant banks ===
==== Locally owned banks ====
- Cornerstone Trust & Merchant Bank

==== Subsidiary/branch of foreign entity ====
- Scotia Investments (Parent -The Bank of Nova Scotia)

== Nicaragua ==
=== Central bank ===
- Central Bank of Nicaragua

=== Commercial banks ===
- BAC Credomatic
- Grupo Promerica
- Banco LAFISE

== Panama ==
=== Government-owned banks ===
- Banco Nacional de Panama
- Caja de Ahorros de Panamá
- Banco de Desarrollo Agropecuario

=== Commercial local banks ===
- Banco General (Panamá)
- Banistmo
- Banesco
- Global Bank
- Multibank
- Metrobank
- Banco Universal
- Banco Aliado
- Credicorp Bank

=== Foreign-owned banks ===
- Citibank (subsidiary of Citigroup which merged with Banco Uno and Banco Cuscatlan)
- Banco Atlantico Panama (subsidiary of Banco Santander)
- Scotiabank

== Paraguay ==
=== Central bank ===
- Banco Central del Paraguay

=== Commercial banks ===
- Sudameris
- Banco Itaú (Paraguay)
- Banco Continental (Paraguay)
- Banco GNB (Paraguay)
- Banco Atlas
- Banco Familiar
- Banco Nacional de Fomento
- Banco BASA
- Banco Río
- Interfisa Banco
- Citibank
- Banco do Brasil
- Banco de la Nación Argentina
- Crédito Agrícola de Habilitación

=== Defunct banks ===
- Banco Regional
- Visión Banco
- Ueno Bank

== Peru ==
=== Central bank ===
- Banco Central de Reserva del Perú

=== Government-owned banks ===
- Bank of the Nation (Peru)

=== Commercial banks ===
- Banco de Crédito del Perú
- BBVA Perú
- Interbank
- Scotiabank
- BanBif
- Mibanco
- Grupo Santander
- Citibank
- Banco Falabella
- Banco de Comercio
- Banco Azteca
- Caja Trujillo
- Standard Chartered
- Deutsche Bank
- Banco Interamericano de Finanzas
- Banco Financiero
- Banco Ripley
- Banco del Trabajo

=== Development banks ===
- Banco de Materiales
- Agrobanco

=== Defunct banks ===
- Banco Sudamericano
  Sold to and rebranded as Scotiabank in 2006
- Banco Santander
  Operations in Peru acquired by Banco de Credito del Peru (Santander returns to Peru in 2007)
- BankBoston
  Peruvian operations acquired by Banco de Credito del Peru
- Banco de Lima Sudameris
  Merged with Banco Wiese and rebranded as Banco Wiese Sudameris
- NBK Bank
- Banco del Pais
- Banco Republica
- Bancosur
  Merged with Banco Santander and rebranded as Banco Santander Central Hispano
- Banco Solventa
- Serbanco
- Banco Latino
  Operations acquired by Interbank
- Banco Interandino
  Acquired by Banco Santander
- Banco Mercantil
  Acquired by Banco Santander
- Banco del Progreso
- Banco de Desarrollo
- Banco Popular del Peru
- Banco CCC
- Surmeban top Gen
- Banpeco
- Bancoop
- Banco Agrario
- Banco Hipotecario
- Banco Industrial del Peru
- Banco Minero
- Banco Comercial del Peru

== Saint Lucia ==
=== Commercial banks ===
- 1st National Bank of St Lucia
- Bank of Saint Lucia

=== Branches of foreign banks ===
- Republic Bank
- Royal Bank of Canada (RBC)

=== Foreign-owned banks ===
- CIBC Caribbean

== Saint Vincent and the Grenadines ==
=== Central bank ===
- Eastern Caribbean Central Bank

=== Commercial banks ===
- Bank of St. Vincent and the Grenadines
- CIBC Caribbean
- First St. Vincent Bank
- 1st National Bank
- Republic Bank
- St. Vincent Co-operative Bank

=== Offshore banks ===
- Loyal Bank Limited
- United Bank Limited
- European Commerce Bank
- Safe Harbor Bank Ltd.
- Trend Bank Ltd.
- Millennium Bank Inc.

== Suriname ==
=== Central bank ===
- Central Bank of Suriname

=== Commercial banks ===
- De Surinaamsche Bank
- Hakrinbank
- Surinaamse Volkscredietbank
- Surinaamse Postspaarbank
- Landbouwbank
- Surichangebank
- Finabank
- Cooperatieve spaar- en kredietbank Godo

=== Foreign-owned banks ===
- RBC Suriname; former subsidiary of the Royal Bank of Trinidad and Tobago
- Southern Commercial Bank Suriname

== Trinidad and Tobago ==
Central Bank

- Central Bank of Trinidad and Tobago

Other Banks

- Bank of Baroda Trinidad and Tobago Limited
- Citicorp Merchant Bank Ltd
- First Citizens Bank (Trinidad and Tobago)
- Intercommercial Bank Limited
- Royal Bank of Trinidad and Tobago (RBTT)
- Republic Bank
- Scotiabank Trinidad and Tobago Limited

== Uruguay ==
=== Central Bank ===
- Banco Central del Uruguay

=== State-owned ===
- Banco de la República Oriental del Uruguay
- Banco Hipotecario del Uruguay

=== Private ===
- Banco Santander Uruguay
- Banco Itaú (Uruguay)
- BBVA Uruguay
- Scotiabank (Uruguay)
- Banque Heritage (Uruguay)
- Banco de la Nación Argentina
- BANDES

=== Defunct banks ===
- Discount Bank (Latin America) S.A.
- HSBC Bank (Uruguay) S.A.
- Banco Surinvest S.A.
- Citibank N.A. Sucursal Uruguay
- Lloyds TSB Bank plc

== Venezuela ==
=== Central bank ===
- Central Bank of Venezuela

=== Government-owned banks ===
- Banco de Venezuela
- BANDES
- Banco Bicentenario

=== Commercial banks ===
- Banco Nacional de Crédito
- BBVA Provincial
- Banesco
- Banco Mercantil
- Banco del Tesoro
- Bancamiga
- Banplus
- Bancaribe
- Banco Venezolano de Crédito
- Banco Plaza
- Fondo Común
- Banco DELSUR
- Banco Exterior (Venezuela)
- Bancrecer
- Banco Caroní
- Banco Activo
- 100% Banco
- Sofitasa
- Iran-Venezuela Bi-National Bank

=== Defunct banks ===
- Banco Occidental de Descuento
- Banco Federal
- Banco Latino
- Stanford Bank Venezuela
- Banco Industrial de Venezuela
- Women's Development Bank

== Largest banks in the Americas ==
The 20 largest banks in the Americas by total assets, as of 2023.

Rank	Bank name	Country	Total assets (billions of US$)
1	JPMorgan Chase & Co.	United States	$3,875.39
2	Bank of America	United States	$3,180.15
3	Citigroup Inc.	United States	$2,200.83
4	Wells Fargo & Co.	United States	$1,932.47
5	Goldman Sachs	United States	$1,641.59
6	Royal Bank of Canada	Canada	$1,566.41
7	Toronto-Dominion Bank	Canada	$1,428.29
8	Morgan Stanley	United States	$1,193.69
9	Scotiabank	Canada	$1,041.11
10	Bank of Montreal	Canada	$990.19
11	Canadian Imperial Bank of Commerce	Canada	$726.27
12	U.S. Bancorp	United States	$663.49
13	Capital One	United States	$629.99
14	PNC Financial Services	United States	$561.58
15	Banco Itaú	Brazil	$555.72
16	Truist Financial Corp	United States	$535.35
17	Charles Schwab Corporation	United States	$493.18
18	Banco do Brasil	Brazil	$447.72
19	BNY Mellon	United States	$409.88
20	Banco Bradesco	Brazil	$394.76

== See also ==
- List of largest banks
- List of largest banks in Latin America
- List of largest banks in North America
- List of largest banks in the United States
- List of financial regulatory authorities by country
