= List of banks in Venezuela =

This is a list of banks operating in Venezuela.

Name	Ownership	Headquarters	Established	Disestablished
Central Bank of Venezuela	Central bank	Caracas	1939	
Banco Bicentenario	State-owned	Caracas	2009	
Banco Industrial de Venezuela	State-owned	Caracas	1937	2016
Banco de Venezuela	Privately owned	Caracas	1890	
Banesco	Publicly traded	Caracas	1992	
Mercantil Banco	Privately owned	Caracas	1925	
BBVA Provincial	Publicly traded	Caracas	1953	
Banco Occidental de Descuento	Privately owned	Maracaibo	1957	2022
Banco Nacional de Crédito	Publicly traded	Caracas	1977	
Fondo Común	Privately owned	Caracas	1963	
100% Banco	Privately owned	Caracas	2006	
Women's Development Bank			2001	
Sofitasa		San Cristóbal	1990	
Iran-Venezuela Bi-National Bank		Tehran, Iran	2010	
Bancaribe	Privately owned	Caracas	1954	
Banco Venezolano de Crédito	Publicly traded	Caracas	1925	
BANDES			2001	
Banco Federal		Caracas	1982	2010
Banco Latino		Caracas	1950	1994
Stanford Bank Venezuela		Caracas		2009
Banco Activo			1978	
Banco Caroní	Publicly traded	Ciudad Guayana	1981	
Banco Exterior	Publicly traded	Caracas	1956	
Banco Guayana	Publicly traded	Ciudad Guayana	1955	2012
Banco del Tesoro	Publicly traded	Caracas	2005	
Banco Plaza	Publicly traded	Caracas	1989	
Banplus	Publicly traded	Caracas	2007	
Agricultural Bank of Venezuela	State-owned	Caracas	2005	
Citibank Venezuela		Caracas	1917	2021
Corp Banca Venezuela	Publicly traded	Caracas	1997	2013
DELSUR Banco Universal	Publicly traded	Ciudad Guayana	1978	
