= List of companies of Saint Lucia =

Location of Saint Lucia

Saint Lucia is a sovereign island country in the eastern Caribbean Sea on the boundary with the Atlantic Ocean. Part of the Lesser Antilles, it is located north/northeast of the island of Saint Vincent, northwest of Barbados and south of Martinique. It covers a land area of 617 km^{2} (238.23 sq mi) and reported a population of 165,595 in the 2010 census. Its capital is Castries.

Saint Lucia has been able to attract foreign business and investment, especially in its offshore banking and tourism industries, which is Saint Lucia's main source of revenue. The manufacturing sector is the most diverse in the Eastern Caribbean area, and the government is trying to revitalise the banana industry. Despite negative growth in 2011, economic fundamentals remain solid, and GDP growth should recover in the future.

== Notable firms ==
This list includes notable companies with primary headquarters located in the country. The industry and sector follow the Industry Classification Benchmark taxonomy. Organizations which have ceased operations are included and noted as defunct.

Notable companies Status: P=Private, S=State; A=Active, D=Defunct
Name	Industry	Sector	Headquarters	Founded	Notes	Status	
1st National Bank of St Lucia	Financials	Banks	Castries	1938	Bank	P	A
Bank of Saint Lucia	Financials	Banks	Castries	2001	Part of Eastern Caribbean Financial Holding Company	P	A
Eastern Caribbean Financial Holding Company	Financials	Consumer finance	Castries	2001	Financial holding	P	A
St. Lucia Electricity Services	Utility	Electric power	Castries	1964		P	A

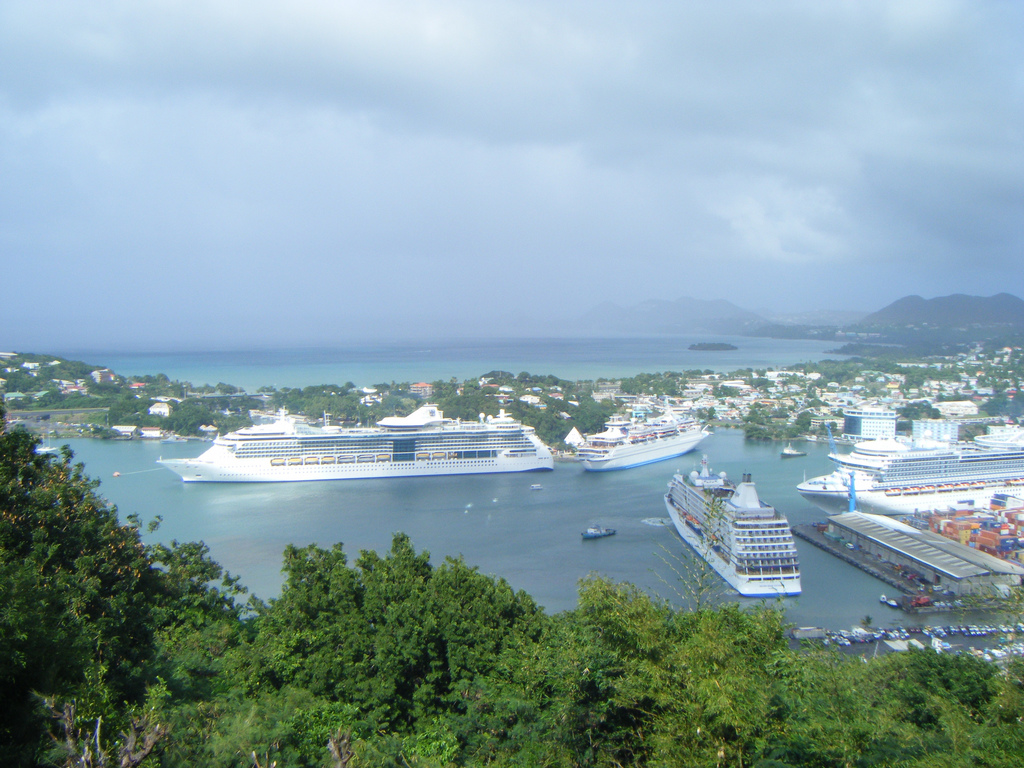
Tourism trade in Castries Harbor

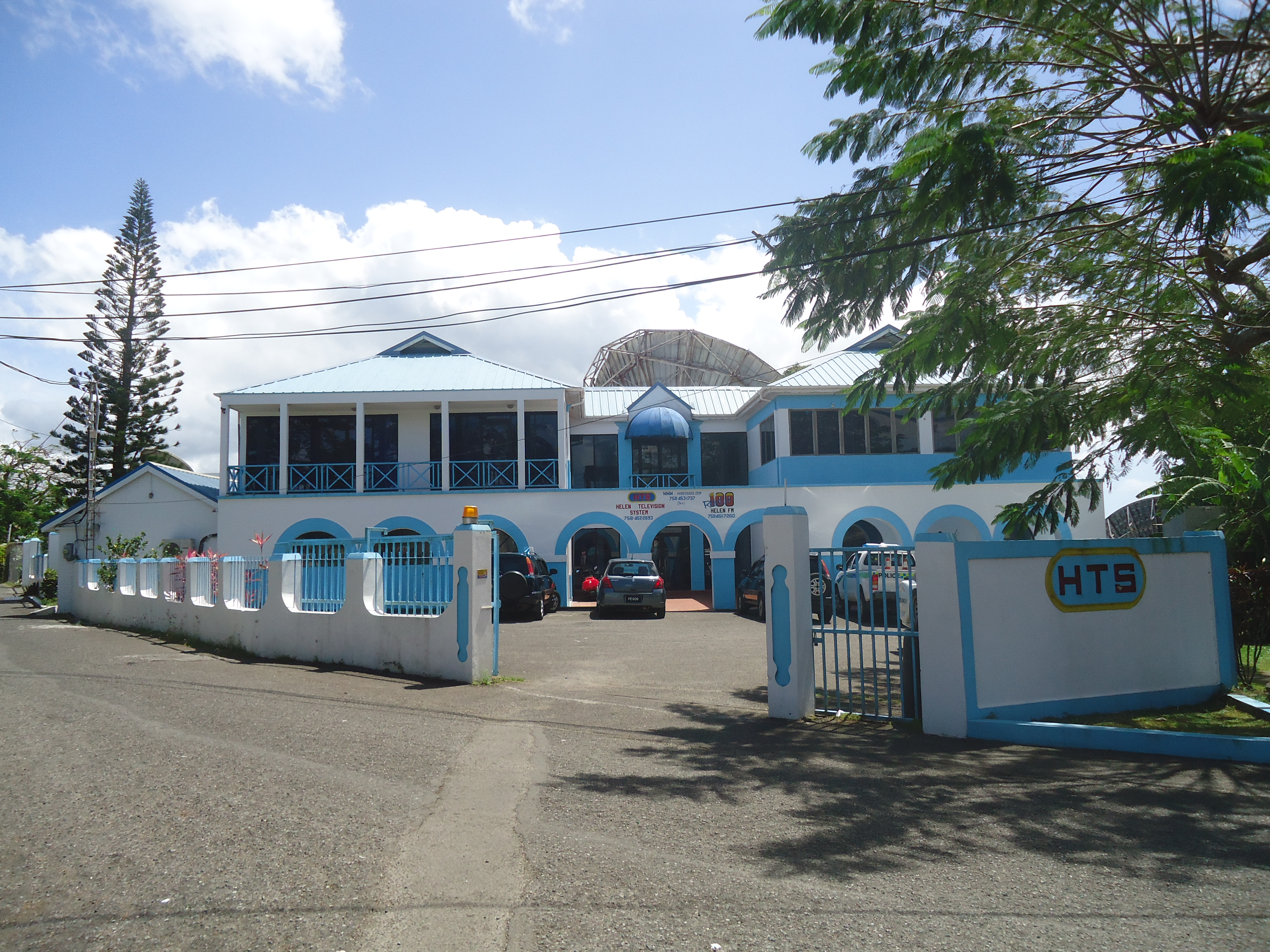
Helen Television in Castries

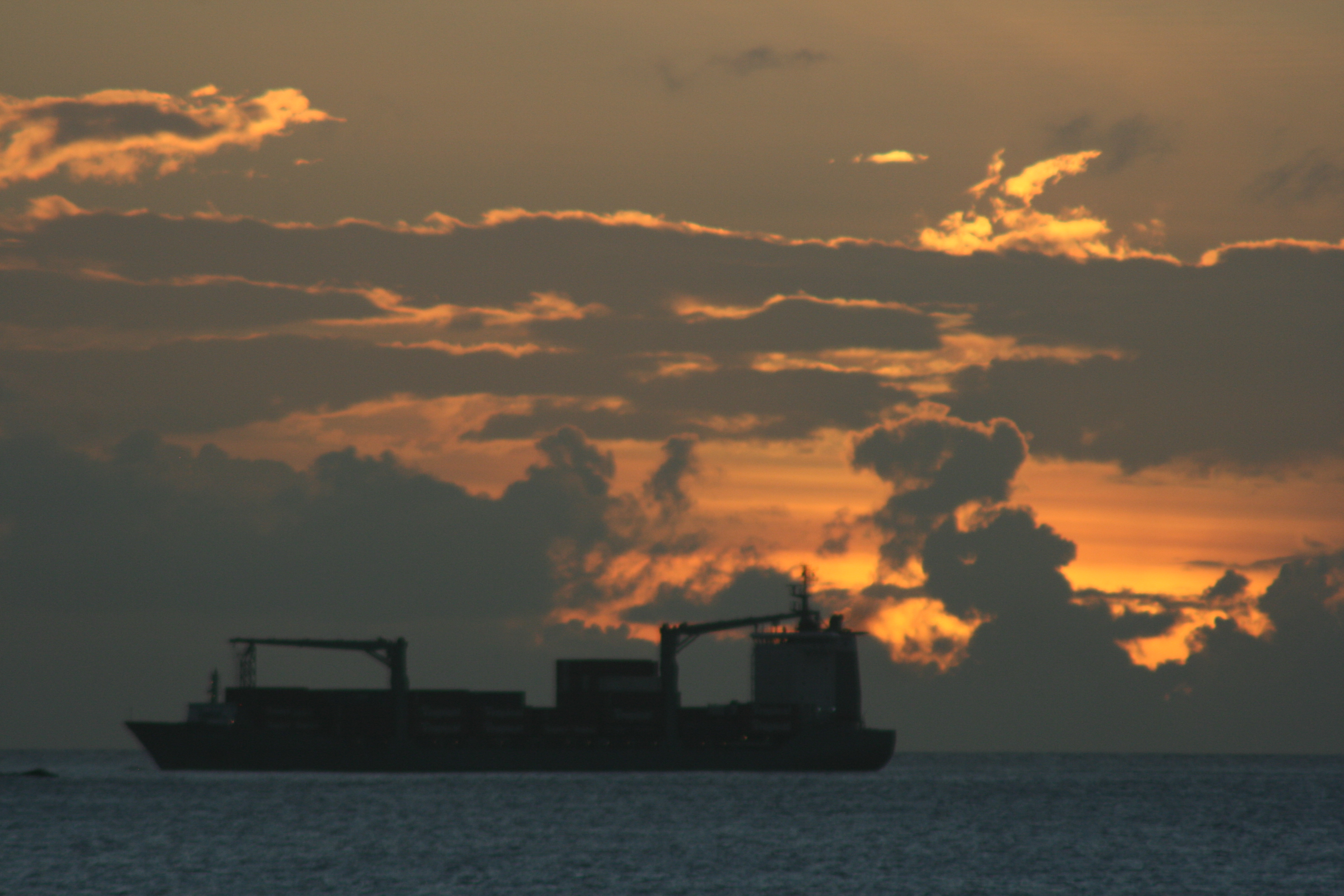
Cargo ship near St. Lucia
