= List of Venezuelan cooperatives =

Since Hugo Chávez became president of Venezuela in 1999, much of the country's oil revenue has been directed to government funding of local privately operated cooperatives and microbusinesses, leading to a proliferation of such enterprises in Venezuela. Until 2004, government policy, relations and funding for cooperatives was handled by the Ministry of the Social Economy; afterwards, the Ministry was disbanded and replaced with two successor ministries: the Ministry of the Popular Power for the Communal Economy (MINEP) and the Ministry of Financing for Development (which controls the Venezuelan Economic and Social Development Bank (BANDES), the Industrial Bank of Venezuela (BIV), and the Development Bank of the Andes (Banfoandes)). MINEP, in turn, manages both CENCOOP (National Executive Council of Cooperatives, a representative deliberation body) and SUNACOOP (National Superintendence of Cooperatives, an oversight body).

The following is a list of cooperative organizations in Venezuela:

- CECOSESOLA (Cooperativa Central de Servicios Sociales del Estado Lara), founded in 1967 in the city of Barquisimeto
- Cooperativa Nacional de Ahorro y Prestamo (CNAP)
- Cooperativa Drapner RL
- Venezuela Avanza (Caracas) - textiles
- Grafitos del Orinoco (Guyana region) -- factory produces graphite parts.
- Atabapo Express RL (Transportation)
- Clic RL (Cooperative of translation, interpreting, events and linguistic services among many others)
