= Ricardo Fernández Barrueco =

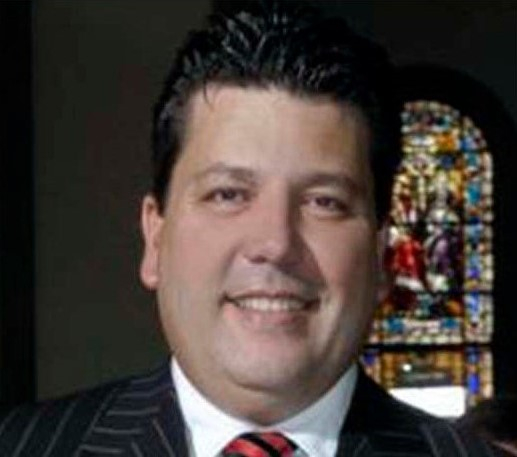
- Born: 1965 (age 59–60); Venezuela
- Occupation: Businessman

Ricardo Fernández Barrueco (born 1965) is a Venezuelan businessman, whose net worth was estimated in 2005 at $1.6bn with "a web of 270 companies in industries as diverse as tuna-fishing and banking". Fernandez' Proarepa Group (nationalised in January 2010) is one of the largest suppliers to the Venezuelan Mercal chain of subsidised state-owned supermarkets.

Barrueco began his career as the owner of a small Venezuelan trucking company. During the Venezuelan general strike of 2002–2003, Barrueco quickly rose to prominence when he aided the government by lending them his vehicles to support the government's attempts to maintain food distribution during the strike. Barrueco received death threats at the time. The distribution network developed during the strike later became the Mercal chain of subsidised state-owned supermarkets.

In mid-2009, Fernandez acquired Digitel GSM from Oswaldo Cisneros for $800m. In September and October 2009, Fernandez led a group of investors in taking over four banks - Canarias, Confederado, Bolívar and BanPro - together accounting for 5.7 percent of Venezuela's banking sector. In late 2009 Fernandez was arrested in Venezuela for a variety of charges, including misappropriation of funds, in connection with the takeover due to liquidity problems of the four banks acquired by Fernandez. He still remains in custody, no trial date has been set. His banks were among several that were taken over by the government during the 2009-2010 Venezuelan banking crisis; several were merged into the new Banco Bicentenario.

Fernandez Barrueco’s Proarepa Group supplied the Venezuelan Mercal chain of subsidized state-owned supermarkets, providing around 10% of the country's maize flour. The company was taken over by the Venezuelan government in January 2010 and placed under the control of the Unidades de Produccion Socialistas (UPS); the government aimed to double production.

Fernandez has an economics degree from Venezuela's Universidad Católica Andrés Bello.
