= NBBL =

NBBL may refer to:

- National Bank of Belize
- Nepal Bangladesh Bank
