= List of banks in Uruguay =

This is a list of commercial banks in Uruguay.

== State-owned ==
Bank	Established	Headquarters
Banco Central del Uruguay	1967	Montevideo
Banco Hipotecario del Uruguay	1892	Montevideo
Banco de la República Oriental del Uruguay	1896	Montevideo

Despite their naming, State Insurance Bank and Social Welfare Bank are not banks but a state-owned insurance company and a social security institute, respectively.

== Private ==
- Banco Bandes Uruguay
- Banco Itaú Uruguay
- Scotiabank Uruguay
- Banco Santander Uruguay
- BBVA Uruguay
- HSBC Bank Uruguay
- Citibank Uruguay
- Banco de la Nación Argentina
- Banque Heritage Uruguay

=== Closed ===
- Banco Maua
- Banco Popular de Montevideo
- Banco La Caja Obrera
- Banco Montevideo
- Banco de Crédito
- Banco Comercial
- Banco Transatlántico
- Banco de Londres y Río de la Plata
- Banco Pan de Azúcar
- Banco Territorial

=== Mergers and acquisitions ===
Bank	Merged with / Acquired by
Lloyds TSB	Banque Heritage Uruguay
ABN AMRO	Banco Santander Uruguay
Banco Surinvest	Banque Heritage Uruguay
Crédit Uruguay Banco (formerly Banco Acac)	Banco Bilbao Vizcaya Argentaria Uruguay
Discount Bank (Latin America)	Scotiabank Uruguay
Nuevo Banco Comercial	Scotiabank Uruguay

== See also ==
- List of banks in the Americas
