= WDB =

WDB or wdb may refer to:

- .wdb is the Microsoft Works database file extension
- William Denis Browne (1888–1915), a British composer, pianist, organist and music critic of the early 20th century
- Women's Development Bank, a woman's services organization in Venezuela
- Wondabyne railway station railway station code, in Australia
- Woodbridge (Amtrak station) railroad station code, in the United States
- Woodbridge railway station railway station code, in the UK
- a korean k-pop band
