= Banco Prodem =

- Type: Sociedad Anónima (S.A.)
- Industry: Financial
- Founded: La Paz, Bolivia (May 12, 1999)
- Headquarters: La Paz, Bolivia
- Key people: CEO Anabel Pereira Fernandez
- Products: Financial services
- Website: www.prodem.bo

Banco Prodem is a Bolivian bank and financial services company with headquarters in La Paz. It is a full-service corporation that provides a wide range of financial products and services to an individual clients through a national network.

== History ==
On August 18, 1998, the decision was made to found, organize, and incorporate Fondo Financiero Privado Prodem S.A. through a single act. Its primary objective is to conduct operations aimed at financing the activities of medium, small, and micro-borrowers; to this end, the company is authorized to carry out all liability, contingent, and auxiliary financial service operations permitted by law within the Plurinational State of Bolivia, prioritizing rural areas.

Furthermore, on December 28, 1999, the Superintendency of Banks and Financial Entities (currently ASFI), pursuant to Article 16 of the Law on Banks and Financial Entities, granted an operating license to the Private Financial Fund Prodem S.A., authorizing it to commence operations simultaneously at its regional offices and branches starting January 3, 2000.

Fondo Financiero Privado Prodem S.A. operates in Bolivia through its headquarters and offices in La Paz, Santa Cruz, Cochabamba, Oruro, Chuquisaca, Tarija, Potosí, Beni, and Pando, organized into a network of 54 urban branches and 69 rural branches.

As of 2008, the Economic and Social Development Bank of Venezuela (BANDES) became the largest shareholder and a strategic partner, providing the enhanced financial support that enabled Fondo Financiero Privado Prodem S.A. to continue its growth and consolidation within the national financial system as an entity specializing in microcredit.
