= Banco Digimais =

Brazilian bank

Digimais S.A.
- Type: Sociedade Anônima
- Industry: Financial services
- Founded: 1981
- Headquarters: Porto Alegre, Rio Grande do Sul, Brazil
- Key people: Edir Macedo (owner); Aldemir Bendine (CEO), Cristiano Fraga, Joelson Boeira, Thiago Urbaneja, Fernanda Grecco Alves, Fernando Pajares, João Urbaneja
- Products: Banking
- Number of employees: 257
- Parent: Grupo Record
- Website: https://www.bancodigimais.com.br

Banco Digimais (styled Banco Digi+ in the logo), formerly Banco Renner, is a Brazilian bank founded in 1981 by the Renner family, based in Porto Alegre. It is owned by bishop-turned-businessman Edir Macedo and controlled by Grupo Record. The financial insttiution focuses on payday loans and financing of vehicles. It has seven branches in three states, over 100,000 customers and five key administrators (including Grupo Record), with a net profit of RS$1 billion in 2016.

The bank is specialized in car financing, being appointed as the fourth with the largest interest rate in 2025. In 2026, according to a team of experts appointed by Estadão, it was doing financial manoeuvres to hide a multi-million project.

== History ==
On 25 October 2009, Grupo Record, owner of RecordTV, announced its acquisition of 40% of the bank. In 2013, the Central Bank confirmed the operation, announcing that Edir Macedo and his wife, Ester Bezerra, are foreign investors, since they were domiciled abroad. But the percentage that was decreed increased from 40% to 49% due to adjustments since the parties decided to close the deal.

In July 2020, after approval from the Central Bank, Edir Macedo bought the rest of the bank's operating percentage from the Renner family. At the time, there was a plan to change its name, due to the association with its original owners and with retail outlet Renner, also founded by Grupo A. J. Renner and sold in 1965. On 13 July Sisbacen ('Sistema de Informações do Banco Central = Centrla Bank Information System) officially announced its rename to Banco Digimais (Digi+ in the logo).

In January 2025, Banco Digimais announced an agreement to transfer its operational control from Edir Macedo to businessman Maurício Quadrado, a former Banco Master executive. However, the operation was vetoed by the Central Bank of Brazil in February 2026, after Banco Master and Will Bank's extrajudicial liquidation. The regulator justified the veto due to the financial institution's own crisis aggravating, which recorded accumulated net losses (including approximately R$744 million in 2022), and to the systemic risc associated to managers linked to liquidated institutions.

Operating irregularities came to light, with operations compared to those of banks such as Master, including the sale of fraudulent credit wallets, which ended up in Federal Justice. In early 2026, market estimates appointed that the it had a negative equity worth R$8,5 billion.

After the controversy, the bank was sold to BTG Pactual for an undisclosed sum; the group also owns Banco Pan, formerly of Grupo Silvio Santos. The deal depends of approval from the Central Bank and also from CADE. Since December 2025, its president is Aldemir Bendine, former president of Banco do Brasil and Petrobras.

On 23 June 2026, Banco Digimais was the target of Operação Miragem (Operation Mirage), triggered by the Federal Police to investigate suspicious crimes against the national financial system. The Federal Justice in São Paulo issued nine search warrants and the arrest and seizure of assets worth up to R$670 million from those being investigated.

That same day, the Rio de Janeiro State Accountability Office (TCE-RJ) opened a lawsuit to investigate the R$90 million injection from Cedae to Banco Digimais, target of a federal police operation.
