= HSBC Bank Uruguay =

Former Uruguayan Bank

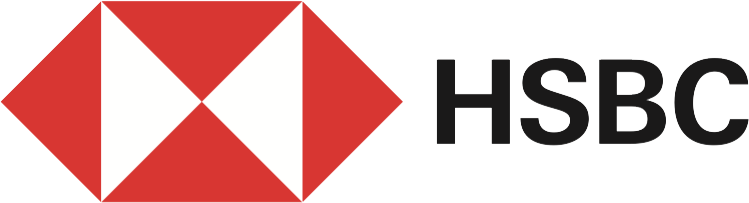

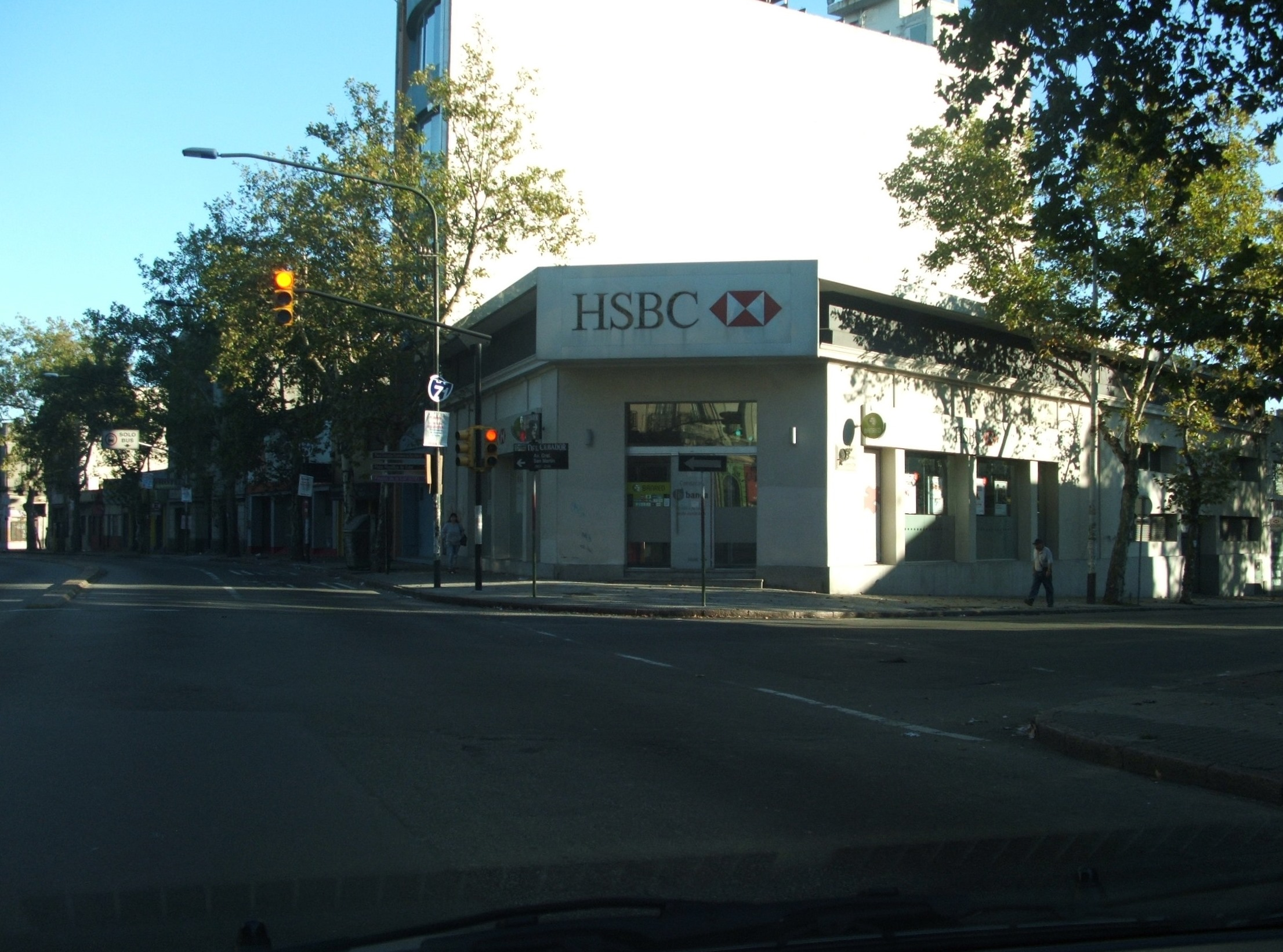
- Branch in Montevideo, Uruguay.
- Type: Subsidiary
- Industry: Finance and Insurance; Pension funds
- Founded: 2000
- Defunct: 2026
- Fate: Acquired by BTG Pactual
- Headquarters: Luis Bonavita 1266, Montevideo, Uruguay
- Number of locations: 5 (2025)
- Key people: Constantino Gotsis (CEO)
- Products: Financial services
- Revenue: UYU 1,66 billion (2025) (USD 41,6 million)
- Total assets: UYU 86,1 billion (2025) (USD 2,2 billion)
- Total equity: UYU 6,88 billion (2025) (USD 172 million)
- Website: hsbc.com.uy

HSBC Bank Uruguay S.A. was the principal HSBC operating company in Uruguay. As of 2025 It was the fifth-largest bank in the country, it provided a full range of banking and financial products and services, including commercial, consumer and corporate banking.

== History ==
HSBC began its operations in Uruguay in 2000, marking the start of a period of steady growth within the local financial market. Initially, the bank employed around 60 people, a number that has since grown significantly, now exceeding 260 team members.

In 2023, the bank inaugurated a new headquarters in Montevideo, designed with an innovative layout and a business model that departs from traditional banking practices. This transformation was driven by internal workplace trends and customer feedback, aiming to deliver a more efficient and personalized banking experience.

=== Sale of HSBC operation in Uruguay in 2025 ===
In 2025, HSBC Latin America announced the sale of its Uruguayan operations to the Brazilian bank BTG Pactual for US$175 million. By the end of 2024, HSBC Uruguay operated five branches across the country, managed total assets of US$1.8 billion, and maintained a loan portfolio valued at US$1.1 billion.

== See also ==
- List of banks in Uruguay
