= Nora Castañeda =

President of the Women's Development Bank
- In office 8 March 2001 – 16 May 2015

Personal details
- Born: 12 June 1942 Caracas, Venezuela
- Died: 16 May 2015 (aged 72) Caracas, Venezuela

Nora Castañeda (12 June 1942 – 16 May 2015) was a Venezuelan economist and activist who was President of the Women's Development Bank from 2001 to 2015.

== Biography ==
She was born and raised by her mother as one of six children; her father placed them in the care of a relative after her mother had first become pregnant. Castañeda joined the Socialist League in the 1970s. After marrying Jesus Rivero, she moved to Nicaragua and joined the Sandinista National Liberation Front during the later stages of the Nicaraguan Revolution. After the Sandinistas came to power in the early 1980s, she returned to Venezuela, joining the working class women’s movement.

Throughout the 1990s, Castañeda became an advisor to and ally of Hugo Chávez. Her contributions to the policies during the 1999 Constituent National Assembly included women homemakers' rights to social security, as well as female pronouns being included in the Constitution of Venezuela. After her death in 2015, she was awarded an Order of the Liberator by Vice President Jorge Arreaza.
