= Venezuelan banking crisis of 2009–2010 =

The 2009–2010 banking crisis in Venezuela occurred when the government took control of several banks following revelations that institutions owned by supporters of Hugo Chavez supporters were in financial trouble after engaging in questionable business practices. Some were seriously undercapitalized, others were apparently lending large sums of money to top executives, and at least one financier couldn't prove where he got the money to buy his banks in the first place." In November and December 2009 seven banks were taken over, accounting for around 12% of total deposits. In 2010 more banks were taken over. The government arrested at least 16 bankers and issued more than 40 corruption-related arrest warrants for others who had fled the country.

== 2009 ==
In September and October 2009 Ricardo Fernández Barrueco had led a group of investors in taking over four banks - Canarias, Confederado, Bolívar and BanPro - together accounting for 5.7 percent of Venezuela's banking sector. In late 2009 Fernandez was arrested in Venezuela for a variety of charges, including misappropriation of funds, in connection with the takeover due to liquidity problems of the four banks acquired by Fernandez.

The crisis saw the December 2009 resignation of a government minister, Jesse Chacón, upon the arrest of his brother Arné Chacón in relation to a banking corruption scandal. He stated in media interviews, "I called the president and told him that in these conditions I would prefer to resign so that there would be no doubt about our transparency in this investigation".

Earlier in the year the government had already been forced to take over Stanford Bank Venezuela, as well as encountering a corruption crisis at the state-owned Banco Industrial de Venezuela which saw the latter's ex-president arrested on corruption charges.

== 2010 ==
In June 2010 Banco Federal, the country's 11th-largest bank, with deposits of 7.66 billion bolivars, or 2.82 percent of total deposits in the banking system, was taken over by Venezuela's banking regulator. It had been told to expand its capital base by 1.5bn bolivars (around $350m), and had only raised B100m. At least 12 other banks had been taken over since November 2009 after speculation about bank insolvency.

== See also ==
- Venezuelan banking crisis of 1994
