= HSBC Bank Brazil =

HSBC Bank Brasil
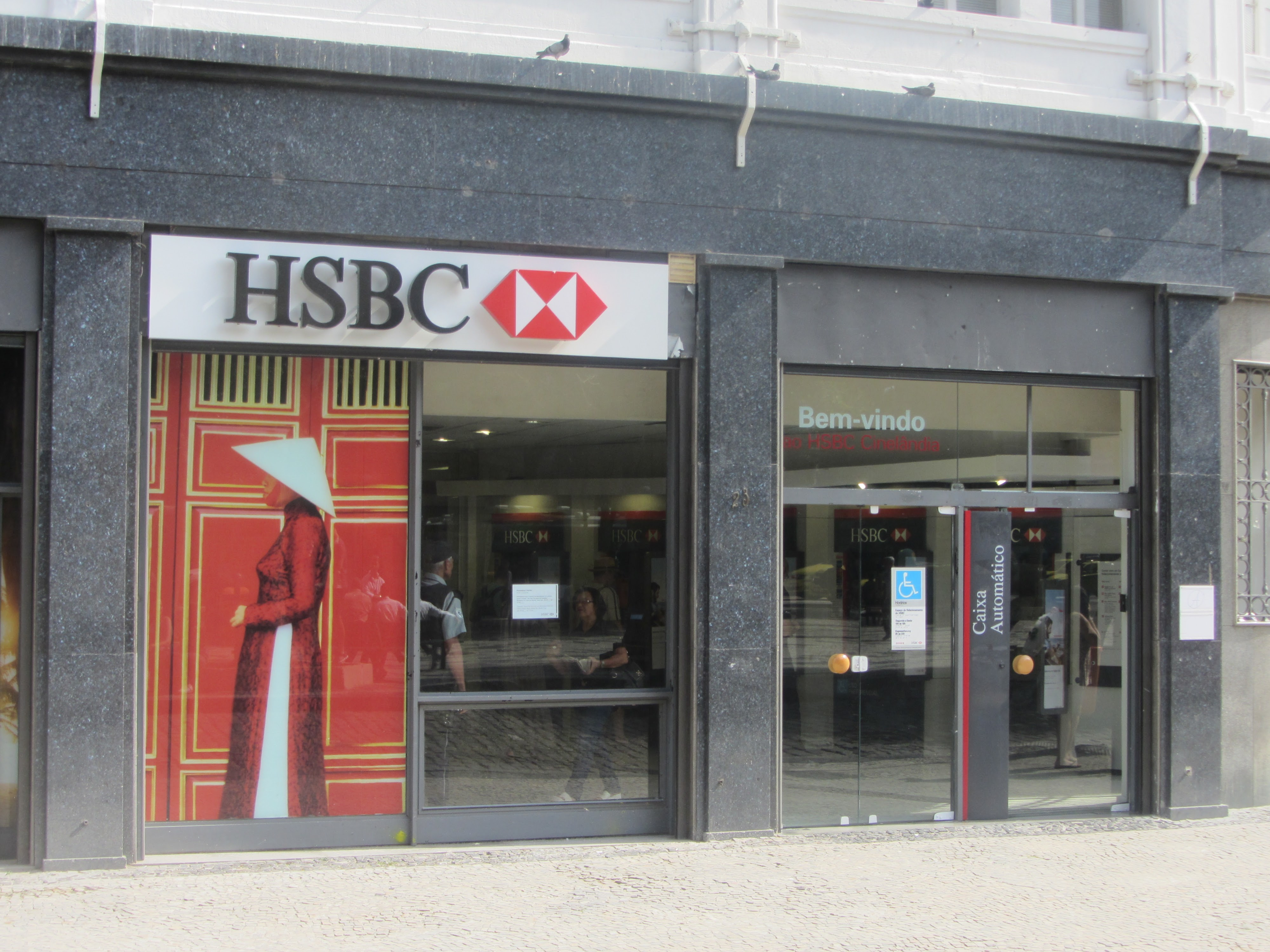
- HSBC retail branch in Rio de Janeiro
- Type: Subsidiary
- Industry: Finance
- Founded: 1952
- Headquarters: São Paulo, Brazil
- Key people: Alexandre B.C. Guião (Chairman)
- Products: Financial services
- Revenue: ▼US$11.4 billion (2012)
- Net income: ▼US$595.7 million (2012)
- Total assets: ▼US$56.3 billion (2012)
- Number of employees: 28,000
- Parent: HSBC Holdings plc
- Website: www.hsbc.com.br

HSBC Bank Brasil S.A. is a Brazilian subsidiary of the British banking group HSBC. In 2016, it sold its retail banking to Banco Bradesco, marking the end of the multinational's operations in the country. However, in 2019, HSBC returned to Brazil as a corporate bank and currently, the entity continues to operate in the country as an exclusively wholesale bank, that is, providing services only to companies.

HSBC established Banco HSBC Bamerindus SA to take over Banco Bamerindus do Brasil S.A. in March 1997 and the bank's name was changed to HSBC Bank Brasil S.A. - Banco Múltiplo in 1999. It was HSBC's lead regional subsidiary in South America and as such it was the regional reporting line for several other countries. It was sold to Bradesco in June 2016.

== History ==
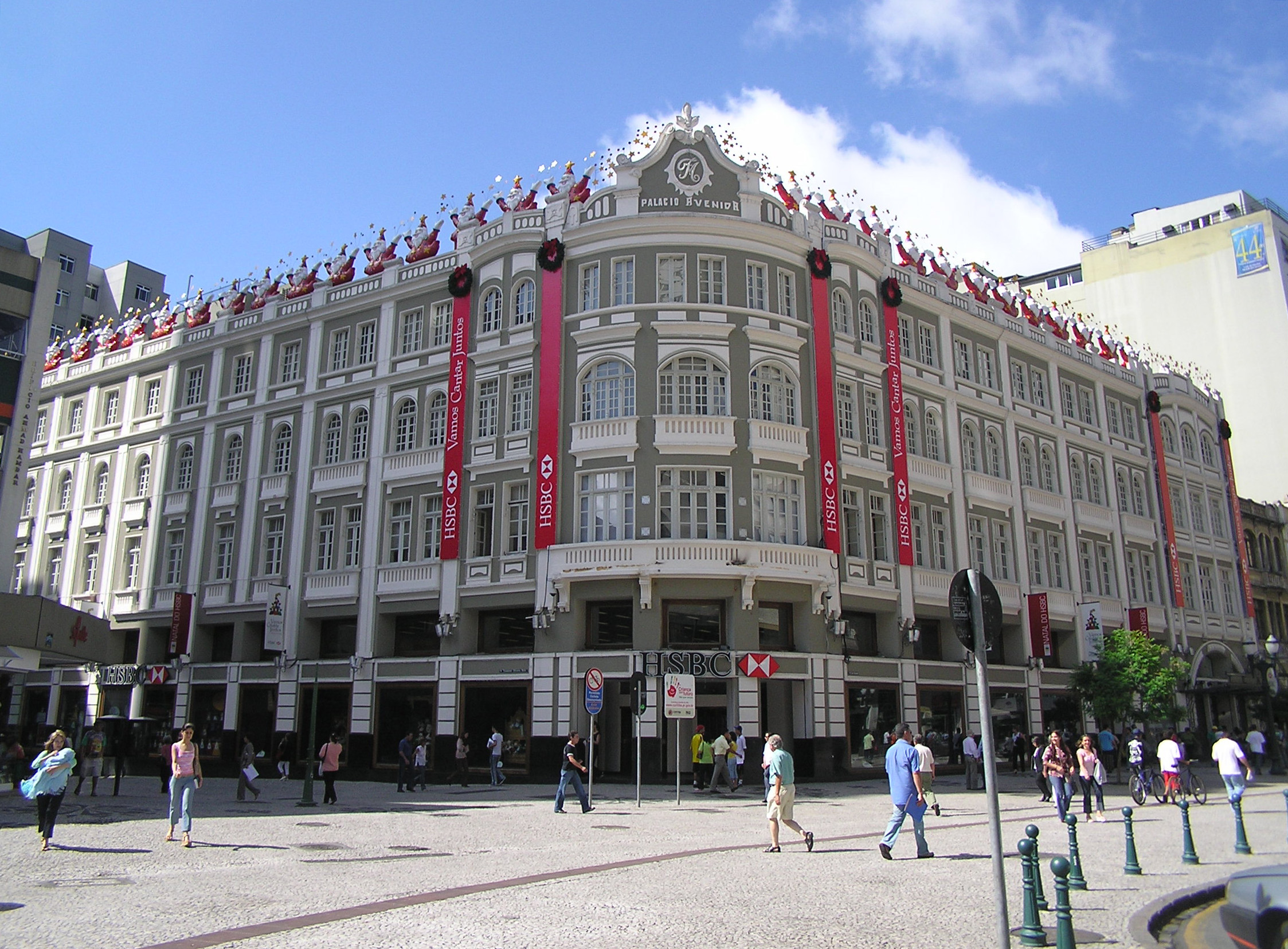
Palacio Avenida: The headquarters of HSBC Bank Brasil, at Christmas, located in Curitiba.

The HSBC Group traces its presence in Brazil to 1976 when Samuel Montagu and Midland Bank opened offices there. What started as a 6.14 per cent shareholding in Banco Bamerindus do Brasil in 1995 led to the Group's acquisition of selected assets, liabilities, and subsidiaries of Banco Bamerindus do Brasil in 1997 and the establishment of Banco HSBC Bamerindus S.A. HSBC bought Banco Bamerindus from the Central Bank of Brazil, which had had to take it over. Banco Bamerindus had been established in 1952. By the time of its acquisition, Banco Bamerindus had almost 1,300 branches, plus insurance, leasing and securities businesses, among others.

In 2003, HSBC bought the Brazilian operations of Lloyds TSB, which included its corporate and wholesale operations, a small retail network, and Losango, a consumer finance business, as well as some offshore assets. The purchase price was US$815m.

On 9 June 2015, HSBC announced its intention to sell off the majority of its operations in Brazil, including personal banking, as part of a plan to cut 50,000 jobs worldwide and on 3 August 2015 HSBC sold operations in Brazil to Banco Bradesco for $5.2 billion. The sale was approved on 8 June 2016 and transfer of customers was expected in October 2016.

== See also ==
- List of banks in Brazil
