= 1st National Bank of St Lucia =

Bank in Saint Lucia

1st National Bank St. Lucia Limited
- Formerly: St. Lucia Co-operative Bank
- Type: Public
- Traded as: ECSE
- Industry: Financial services
- Founded: January 1938; 88 years ago (as the St. Lucia Co-operative Bank)
- Founders: Allen Lewis, John Pilgrim, J. B. D. Osborne, Joseph Deveaux, Clive Beaubrun, J. Q. Charles, George Palmer
- Headquarters: 21 Bridge Street, Castries, Saint Lucia
- Area served: Saint Lucia; Saint Vincent and the Grenadines
- Key people: Nigel Fulgence (Chairman)
- Products: Retail and commercial banking
- Website: 1stnationalbankonline.com

1st National Bank St. Lucia Limited is a commercial bank in Saint Lucia, with its head office at 21 Bridge Street, Castries. It is the oldest indigenous bank in the country, having been founded in 1938 as the St. Lucia Co-operative Bank, and is popularly known as the "Penny Bank". Its shares are publicly traded on the Eastern Caribbean Securities Exchange (ECSE).

== History ==
The bank was incorporated in 1937 and opened for business in January 1938 from a back store on Mongiraud Street, Castries. It was established by seven Saint Lucian founders, Allen Lewis, John Pilgrim, J. B. D. Osborne, Joseph Deveaux, Clive Beaubrun, J. Q. Charles and George Palmer, with a share capital of EC$50,000 divided into one-dollar shares that were made available to ordinary Saint Lucians, a feature that gave rise to its nickname, the "Penny Bank". After a major fire destroyed much of Castries in 1948, the bank provided mortgage finance to help fund the town's rebuilding.

The St. Lucia Co-operative Bank received formal certification of a change of name on 22 June 2004, after which it traded as 1st National Bank St. Lucia Limited.

In December 2019, a consortium of five Eastern Caribbean indigenous banks, 1st National Bank St. Lucia, Antigua Commercial Bank, the National Bank of Dominica, the Bank of Montserrat and the Bank of Nevis, agreed to purchase the Eastern Caribbean banking operations of the Royal Bank of Canada (RBC). On 1 April 2021, the RBC Royal Bank operations in Saint Lucia and Saint Vincent and the Grenadines were absorbed into 1st National Bank St. Lucia Limited, extending the bank's presence into Saint Vincent and the Grenadines.

== Operations ==
Before the RBC acquisition, the bank served customers from six branches and a bureau de change, all located in Saint Lucia. Following the 2021 acquisition it also operates in Saint Vincent and the Grenadines. The bank has 7,000,000 issued ordinary shares; its substantial shareholders include Donald Monplaisir Holdings (14.41%) and the National Development Corporation (5.29%). It employs more than 100 staff.

== Community involvement ==
In June 2017, the bank launched a project to support small and medium-sized businesses and the unemployed. The following month it introduced two scholarship programmes, the Ferrel Victor Charles Secondary School Scholarship and the Francis J. Carasco Scholarship.

== See also ==
- List of banks in the Americas
