= Banco Sofitasa =

Venezuelan universal bank

Banco Sofitasa, S.A.
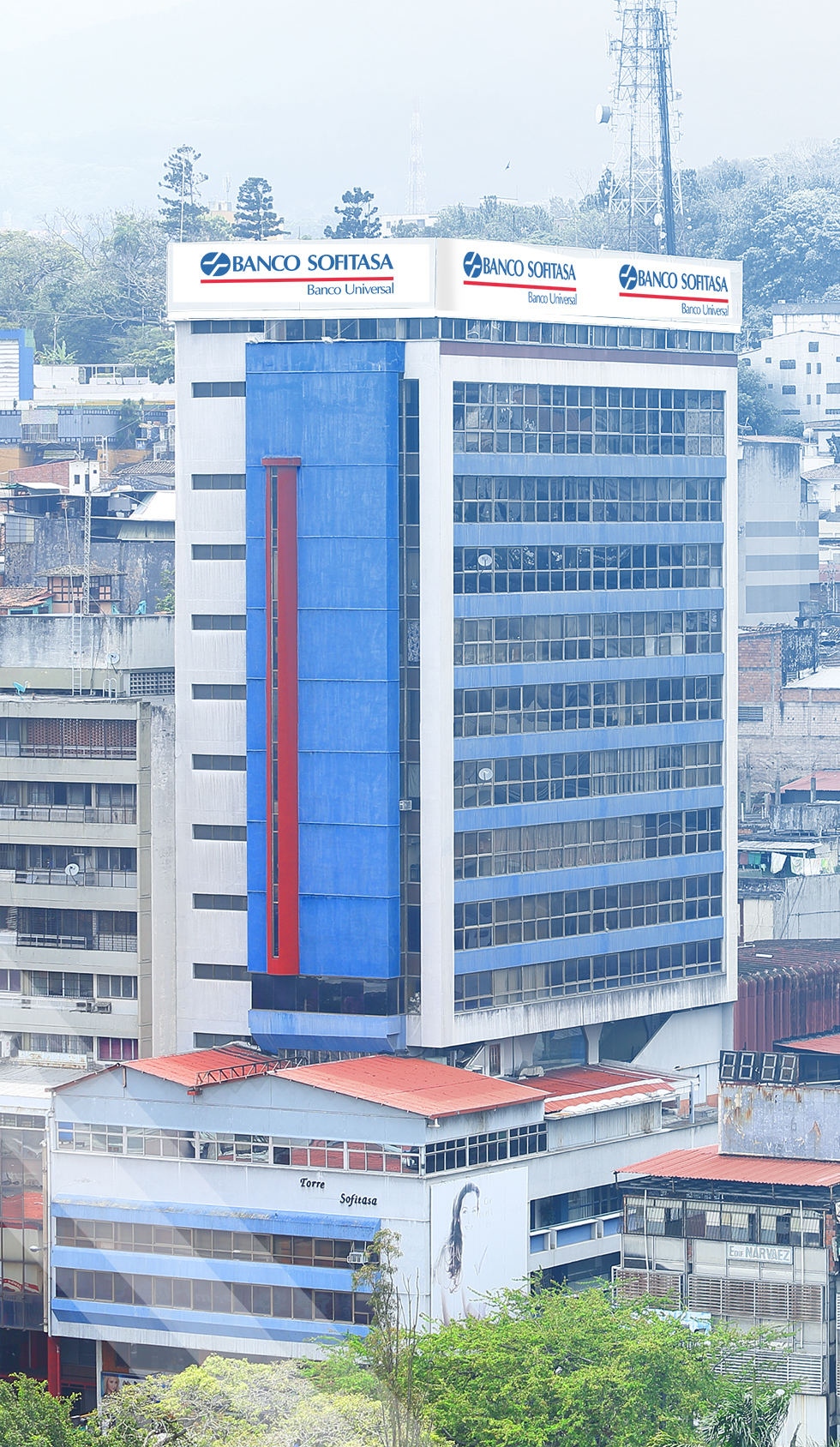
- Banco Sofitasa building in San Cristóbal
- Company type: Universal bank
- Industry: Finance
- Predecessor: SOFITASA (1980s-1990)
- Founded: 15 January 1990; 35 years ago
- Founder: Juan Antonio Galeazzi Contreras
- Headquarters: San Cristóbal, Táchira, Venezuela
- Number of locations: 100 (2013)
- Net income: 6.68 million bolívares
- Website: www.sofitasa.com/certificar/site/p_contenido.asp

Banco Sofitasa (SOciedad FInanciera del TÁchira SA) is a Venezuelan universal bank based in San Cristóbal. Its primary market is in Barinas and the Andean Region and is the only bank in Venezuela with its main headquarters in the Andean region following the closure of Banfoandes. Banco Sofitasa can be found in 18 of Venezuela's 23 states.

== History ==
Banco Sofitasa was originally founded as a small financial institution in the 1980s by Juan Antonio Galeazzi Contreras. It was replaced in January 1990 by a regional commercial bank. In 2001, it became a universal bank, the first regional commercial bank to be approved as a universal bank in western Venezuela. Its status as a universal bank then allowed it to offer a variety of services, including leasing and real estate, investment banking, and lending. Sofitasa is a member of the Banking Association of Venezuela.

Following the 2012 death of Galeazzi, Ángel Gonzalo Medina assumed the presidency until 2018, when Óscar Antonio Galeazzi Mogollón was voted in. Ramón Evencio Molina Duran was voted to replace him in March 2022 after his four-year term ended. Adelis Chávez, brother of President Hugo Chávez, served as the bank's vice president for a number of years. Under him, Sofitasa handled much of the government's banking.

The bank is partnered with Deportivo Táchira F.C.
