= PicPay =

Brazilian financial technology company

- Type: Public
- Industry: Financial services
- Founded: July 19, 2012; 14 years ago
- Founder: Dárcio Schwab Stehling; Diogo Brumas Carvalho Roberte; Anderson Andrade Chamon do Carmo
- Headquarters: São Paulo, Brazil
- Key people: Eduardo Chedid (
- Products: Digital accounts; digital wallets; Pix; cards; credit; investments; insurance; merchant services; business solutions
- Revenue: ▲US$1.88 billion
- Number of employees: +4 500
- Website: picpay.com

PicPay is a Brazilian digital bank and fintech company.

== History ==
PicPay was founded in 2012 in Vitória, with the goal of simplifying payments via mobile devices. In 2015, Banco Original acquired a stake in the company, marking the entry of Batista family's J&F Group into the business. In 2022, the company obtained license from Central Bank to operate as a payment institution. The company also acquired Guiabolso in 2021 and BX Bl in 2023. On 30 January 2026, PicPay holding company PicS N.V. completed its initial public offering, and its Class A shares began trading on Nasdaq under the ticker symbol PICS.

== See also ==
- Digital banking
- Pix (payment system)
- J&F Investimentos
