= BBVA Uruguay =

Banco Bilbao Vizcaya Argentaria Uruguay S.A.

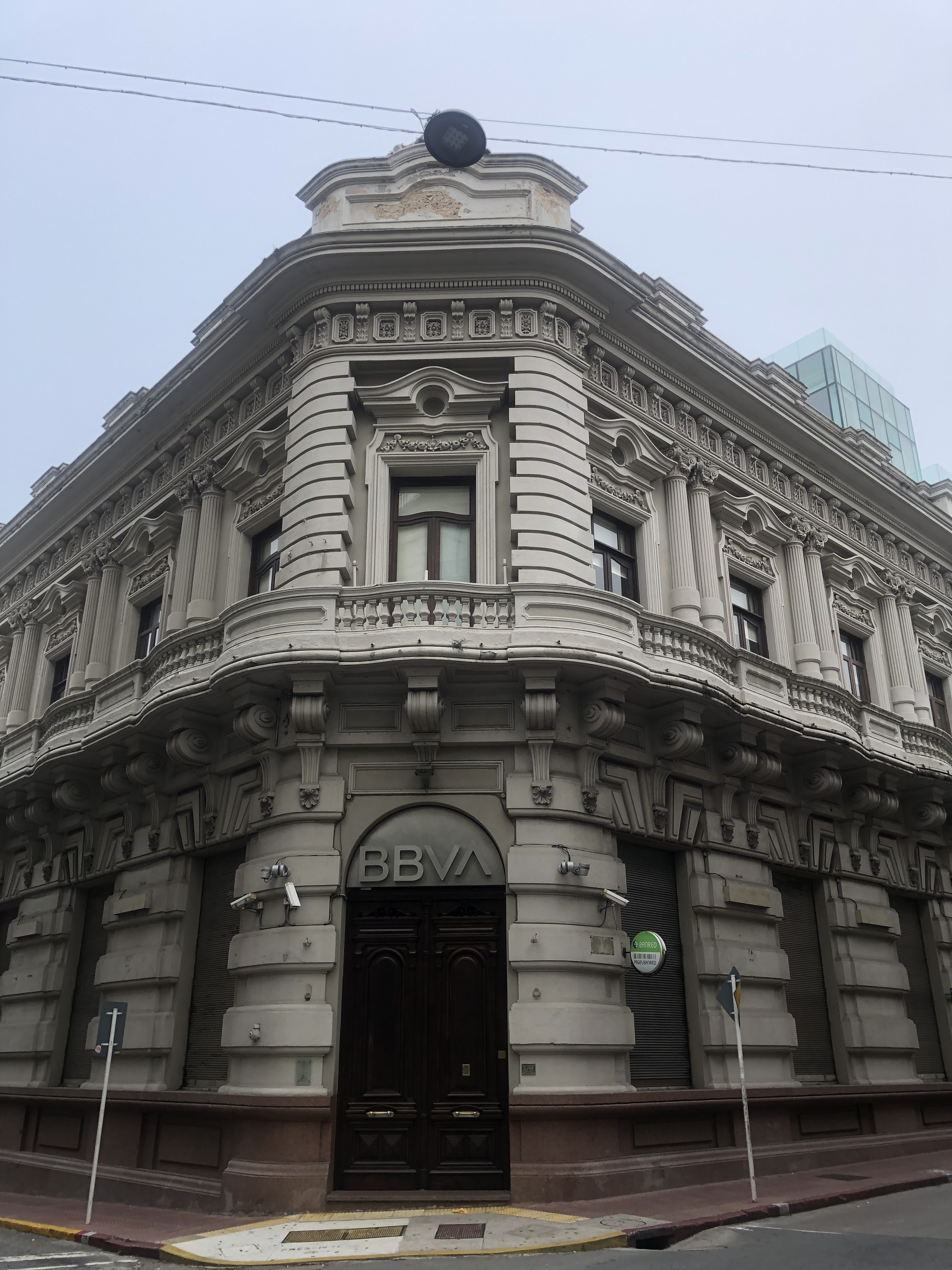
- Headquarters in Montevideo
- Type: Subsidiary
- Traded as: BVM: BBVA
- ISIN: UYBBSU2COUS9
- Industry: Financial services
- Founded: 2000; 26 years ago as BBVA Uruguay
- Headquarters: Montevideo, Uruguay
- Number of locations: 33 (2025)
- Key people: Franco Cinquegrana (CEO)
- Products: Banking, Insurance
- Revenue: UYU 2,6 billion (2025) (USD 66 million)
- Total assets: UYU 185 billion (2025) (USD 412 million)
- Total equity: UYU 16,4 billion (2025) (USD 4,6 billion)
- Number of employees: 580 (2025)
- Parent: BBVA
- Website: bbva.com.uy

BBVA Uruguay is a financial institution in Uruguay and a subsidiary of the Spanish bank Banco Bilbao Vizcaya Argentaria. it underwent several mergers throughout the 20th century before being acquired by BBVA in 2000.

The institution is incorporated as a sociedad anónima and operates under a full banking license granted by the Central Bank of Uruguay. The bank is wholly owned by Banco Bilbao Vizcaya Argentaria, following its acquisition in May 2000. The current entity was formed through the merger of Banco Francés Uruguay and Banco Exterior de América, the former Uruguayan subsidiary of Argentaria.

== History ==
The origins of this institution date back to 1912, with the establishment of the Territorial Bank of Uruguay, which in 1964 merged with the Spanish Bank of Uruguay to become the Spanish and Territorial Bank-Union of Banks of Uruguay.

In 1991, it was acquired by Banesto Banco Uruguay, and five years later, in 1995, the bank was acquired by the French Bank of the River Plate, adopting the name French Bank of Uruguay. In 1997, Banco Vizcaya Argentaria acquired 30% of the French Bank of the River Plate, which led to another name change, becoming BBV-Banco Francés Uruguay in 1998.

In August 1998, BBV acquired Banco Pan de Azúcar, which had been taken over by the Uruguayan government due to financial irregularities..

In 2000, BBV Banco Francés del Uruguay merged with the Foreign Bank of America Argentaria and became known as BBV Uruguay. When the current bank was established through the merger of two major institutions: BBV Banco Francés Uruguay S.A. and Banco Exterior de América S.A.

In 2010, BBVA acquired Crédit Uruguay Banco and became the second largest private bank in the country.

In 2019, BBVA began a process of unifying its brand worldwide.

== See also ==
- Banking in Uruguay
