= Banco PyME Ecofuturo =

Banco PyME Ecofuturo S.A.
- Type: Public
- Industry: Banking, Financial services
- Predecessor: Ecofuturo S.A. (1999)
- Founded: 1999; 27 years ago (as Ecofuturo F.F.P. S.A.)
- Headquarters: La Paz, Bolivia
- Area served: Bolivia
- Products: Consumer banking, corporate banking, finance and insurance, investment banking, mortgage loans, wealth management, credit cards,
- Revenue: ▲ Bs. 24.8 million (2023)
- Total equity: $59.6 million (2024)
- Number of employees: 1,403 (2024)
- Parent: FADES
- Website: www.bancoecofuturo.com.bo

Banco Pyme Ecofuturo S.A. is a Bolivian financial institution that originated from Ecofuturo S.A. Private Financial Fund, founded in 1999. Ecofuturo was established through the collaboration of four Non-Governmental Organizations (NGOs) dedicated to supporting the development of micro and small enterprises in Bolivia.

== History ==
=== 1999 – Beginning ===
Ecofuturo S.A. began its operations during a challenging period for the Bolivian economy, from 1999 to 2002, amid a national macroeconomic crisis. Despite initial financial difficulties, the institution achieved financial stability and sustainable growth in the following years.

=== 2008 – primary shareholder ===
In 2008, shareholder IDEPRO transferred all its shares to Fundación para Alternativas de Desarrollo (FADES), making FADES the primary shareholder of Ecofuturo.

=== 2014 – Transformation to Banco Pyme Ecofuturo ===
In 2014, Bolivia's Financial Services Authority (ASFI) issued a resolution mandating the transformation of Ecofuturo S.A. into Banco Pyme Ecofuturo S.A., a transition that allowed the institution to expand its services. This transformation enabled Banco Pyme Ecofuturo to offer a broader array of financial products, including trusts, foreign trade services, guarantee bonds, and credit cards.

== Operations ==
As of 2024, Banco PyME Ecofuturo offers its services through 136 Financial Care Points, in eight of Bolivias nine departments. Its financial services offered include:

- Credit cards
- Saving accounts
- Microfinance
- Productive sector loans
