= Ministry of the Popular Power for the Communal Economy =

The Ministry of the Popular Power for the Communal Economy (MINEP), also known as the Ministry for Popular Economy, is a ministry of the government of Venezuela which was created by Hugo Chávez in 2004. Succeeding the Ministry of the Social Economy, MINEP manages government relations with, and funding of, local and national cooperatives and microbusinesses.

== List of ministers ==
- Pedro Morejón (2006–2009)
- Olly Millan (2005-2006)
- Elias Jaua (2004-2005)
