= Banco Falabella =

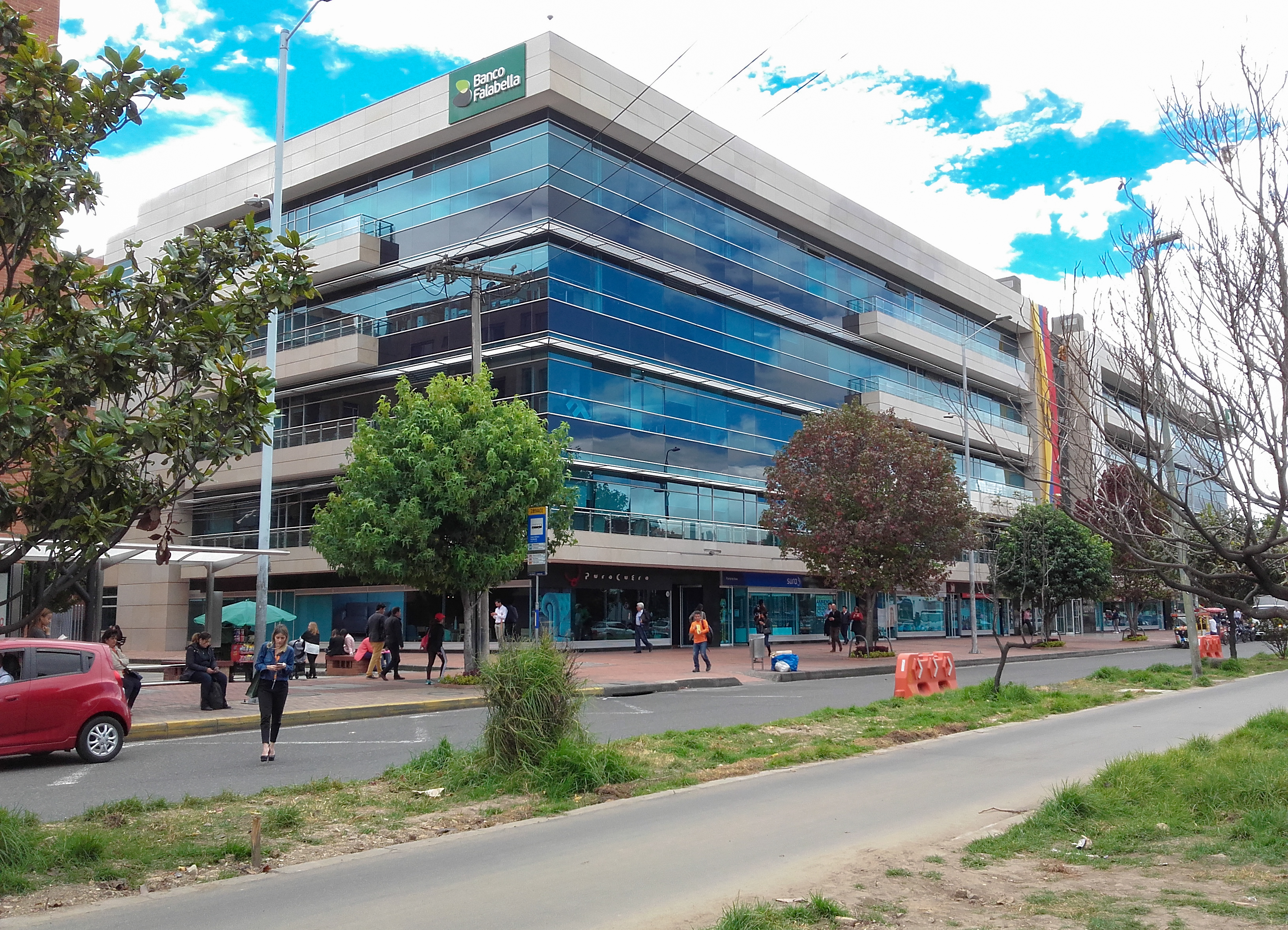
- Office building in Bogotá
- Industry: Finance
- Founded: August 10, 1998
- Headquarters: Chile, Colombia and Peru
- Products: Financial services
- Website: www.bancofalabella.cl

Banco Falabella is a Chilean bank. Founded in 1998, It is headquartered in Las Condes, Chile. It is a subsidiary of S.A.C.I. Falabella and has branches in Chile, Peru, and Colombia.

== History ==
=== Chile ===
The bank was officially incorporated on August 10, 1998, after the shareholders' meeting of ING Bank (Chile) S.A. decided to change the name of the company to Banco Falabella, thus maintaining the banking license to operate within Chilean territory. Said resolution was published in the Official Gazette of the Republic of Chile on August 14 of the same year.

Banco Falabella is currently present in the main Chilean cities, especially those where there are branches of the department store of the same name. Its headquarters are located in downtown Santiago. Its president is Julio Enrique Fernández and its general manager is Alejandro Arze Safian.

=== Peru ===
In Peru, Banco Falabella has branches in the main cities, being based in the former Nextel Building in Lima. By 2014, the bank already had more than 1,530,000 clients of credit cards, loans and savings products. Since 2022 the General Manager in Peru has been Matías Aranguren.

=== Colombia ===
On May 12, 2011, the Financial Superintendency of Colombia authorized the conversion of CMR Falabella S.A. to Banco Falabella Colombia, managing to obtain its banking license to operate throughout the Colombian national territory. After seven years of operation, in 2018 it was positioned as the fourth credit card issuer in Colombia, in addition to the first Mastercard card issuer in the country.
