= Banco Santander Uruguay =

Santander Uruguay

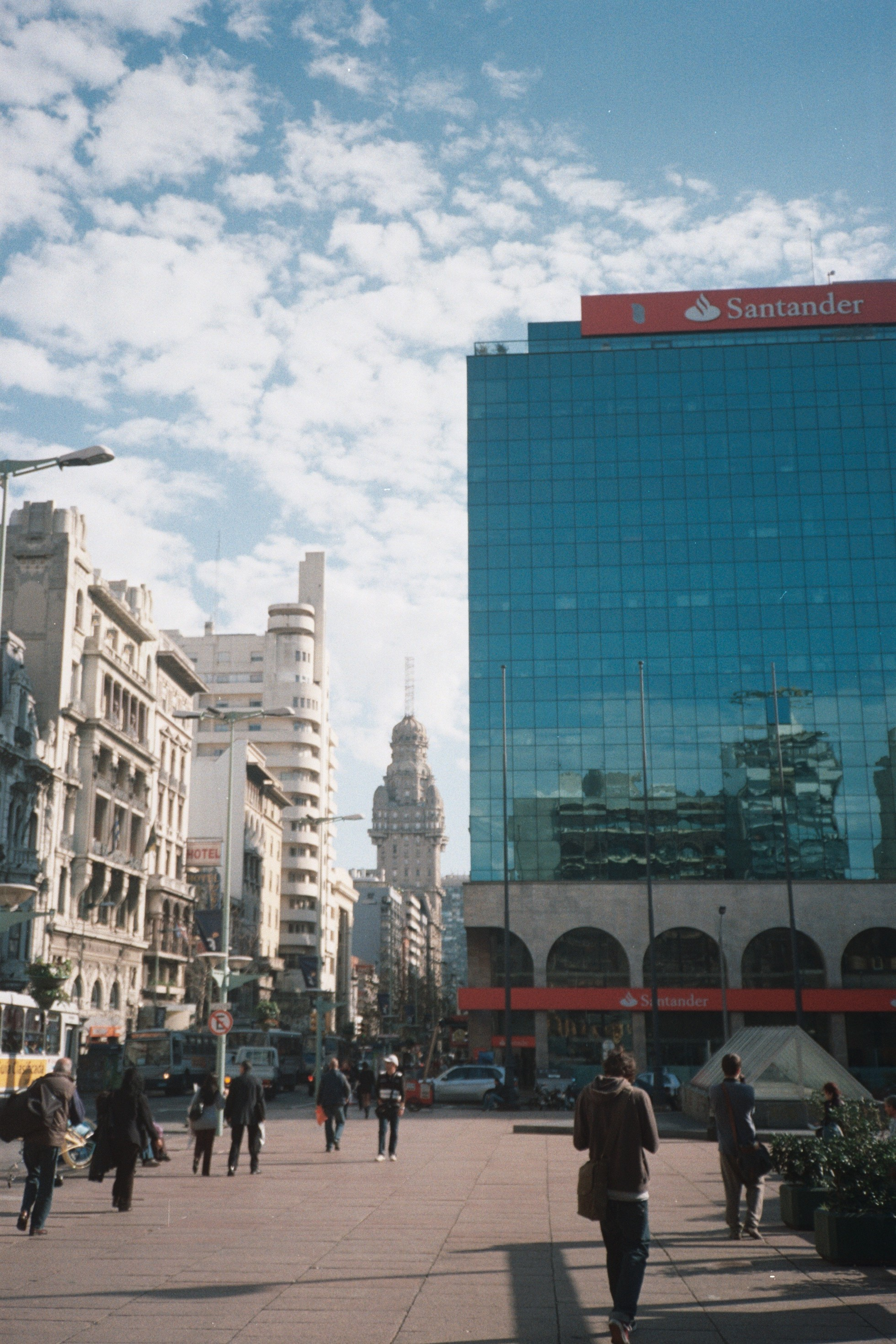
- Headquarters in Central Montevideo
- Type: Subsidiary
- Traded as: Banco Santander S.A
- Industry: Financial services
- Founded: 1979; 47 years ago
- Headquarters: Montevideo, Uruguay
- Number of locations: 88 (2025)
- Key people: Gustavo Trelles (CEO)
- Products: Banking, Insurance
- Total assets: UYU 309.2 billion (2023) (USD 7.73 billion)
- Parent: Banco Santander
- Website: santander.com.uy

Banco Santander Uruguay is a commercial bank and financial services company in Uruguay and a subsidiary of the Spanish Banco Santander. Established in 1979, it is one of the largest private banks in the country.

== History ==
Banco Santander Uruguay entered the Uruguayan financial market in 1979. In 1982, the institution formerly known as Bancos del Litoral Asociados, which operated a network of nineteen branches across the country, was acquired by Banco Santander and subsequently began operating under its current name.

In 2008, the group further expanded its presence through the acquisition of the Uruguayan subsidiary of the Dutch bank ABN AMRO, consolidating its position as one of the largest private banks in the country. In 2012, it acquired the Uruguayan financial company and credit administrator Creditel.

In 2025, it established its Santander Private Banking division.

== See also ==
- List of banks in Uruguay
