= CCB Brasil =

Brazilian banking company

China Construction Bank (Brasil) Banco Múltiplo S/A
- Company type: Subsidiary
- Industry: Financial services
- Founded: 1938
- Headquarters: São Paulo, Brazil
- Products: Banking
- Revenue: ▼US$ 1.2 billion (2012)
- Net income: ▼US$ 53.6 million (2012)
- Total assets: ▼US$ 8.2 billion (2013)
- Number of employees: 1,000
- Parent: China Construction Bank
- Website: www.br.ccb.com

CCB Brasil former BicBanco is a middle size Brazilian Bank founded in 1938 in Juazeiro do Norte, Ceará state by José Bezerra de Menezes and in 1948 Maria Amélia Bezerra de Menezes the matriarch of the family was the first woman in to be a Chairwoman of a bank in Brazil. Currently the company is headquartered in Avenida Paulista, in São Paulo. In 2013 Bezerra de Menezes family sold all of its shares in BICBANCO (72%) to China Construction Bank.

CCB Brasil has 45 bank branches in Brazil and 1 in Cayman Island, through its bank branches the bank operates on credit operations to the Middle Market segment. Its services range includes loans, leasing, investment fund management, foreign exchange securities distribution and brokerage, among others.
