= Banco Ripley =

Chilean bank

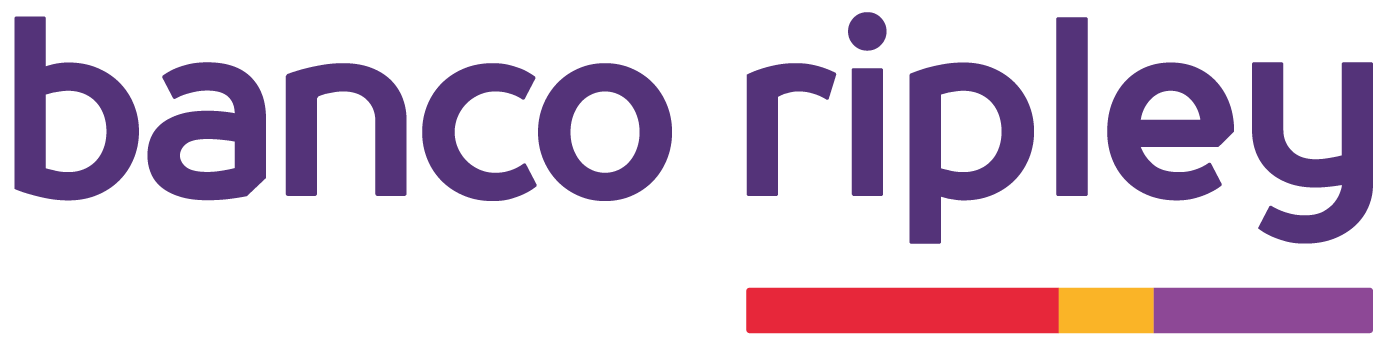

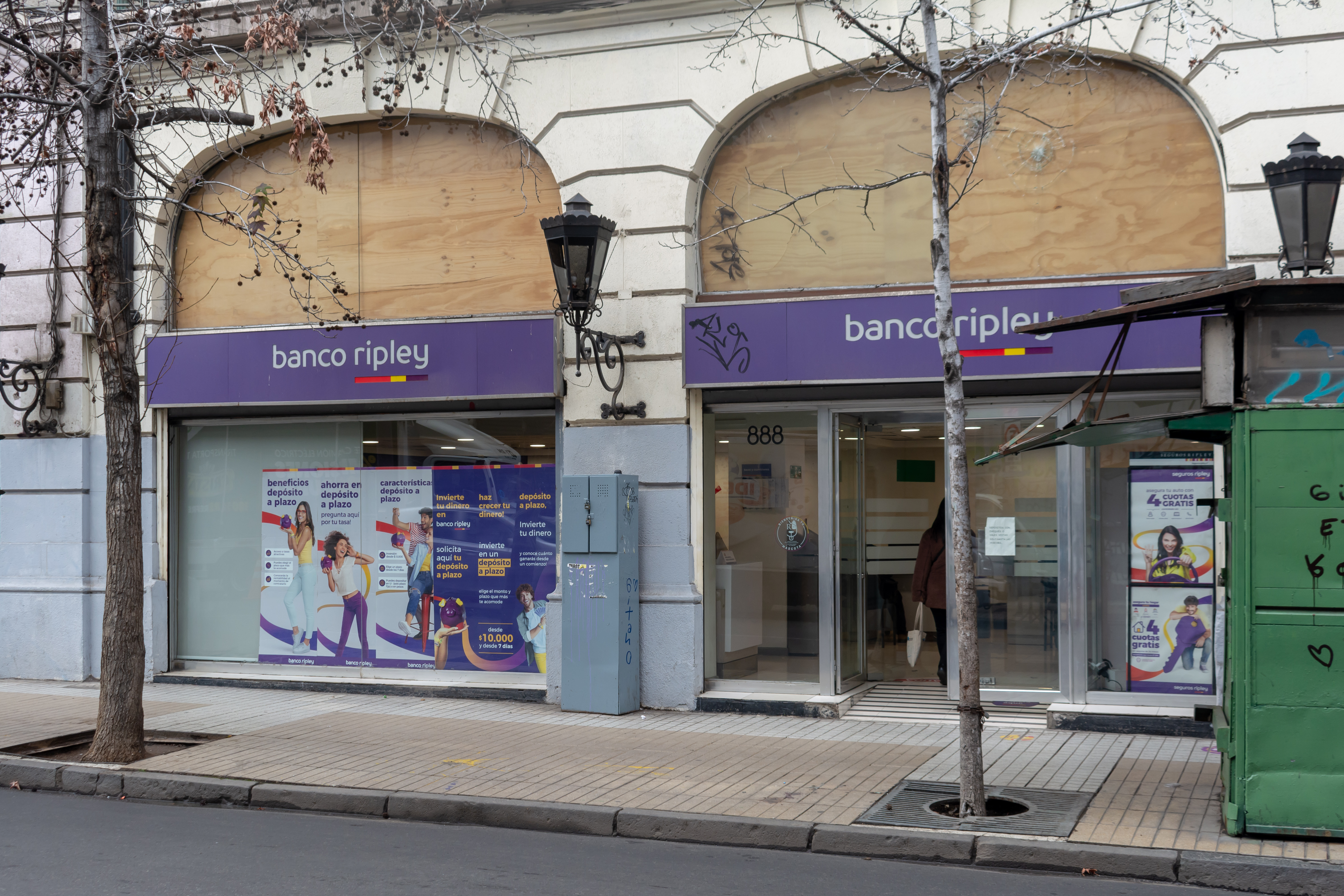
- Agency of the bank in Santiago de Chile
- Industry: Banking
- Founded: 2003
- Headquarters: Santiago, Chile
- Website: bancoripley.com

Banco Ripley is a bank in Chile.

== Overview ==
The bank was created in 2003. It is a subsidiary of Ripley S.A. and is headquartered in Santiago.
