= Banco Pan =

Brazilian bank

Banco Pan S.A.
- Type: Sociedade Anônima
- Traded as: B3: BPAN4
- Industry: Financial services
- Founded: 1969
- Headquarters: São Paulo, Brazil
- Key people: Jorge Fontes Hereda (Chairman); José Luiz Arcar Pedro (CEO)
- Products: Banking
- Revenue: ▲US$ 1.9 billion (2013)
- Net income: ▼ - US$ 64.1 million(2013)
- Total assets: ▲US$ 9.1 billion (2013)
- Number of employees: 378
- Parent: BTG Pactual; Caixa Econômica Federal
- Website: https://www.bancopan.com.br

Banco Pan, is a Brazilian midsize commercial bank headquartered in São Paulo. The bank primarily focuses on granting consumer loans to individuals in lower to medium income brackets. Its services include consumer loans, payroll deduction loans, credit cards branded as Visa or MasterCard, insurance products, leasing, and group financial activities.

== History ==
Banco Pan was founded in 1969 when Grupo Silvio Santos, owned by billionaire media-man Silvio Santos, purchased the Banco Real Sul and renamed it PanAmericano.

The bank has operated as a multi-service bank since 1991, starting its credit card operations in 1994 and leasing operations in 1998 through a subsidiary, Panamericano Arrendamento Mercantil. In 1999, the insurance company, Panamericano de Seguros was incorporated into the bank. Banco Pan has been offering payroll deduction loans since 2002.

In 2005 it garnered public attention for large bonuses. In 2009, Caixa Econômica Federal, the second largest Brazilian state-owned bank, bought part of the Grupo Silvio Santos shares becoming the second largest shareholder of the institution.

=== Crisis of 2010 ===
On November 8, 2010, Silvio Santos, announced a loan of 2.5 billion reais (1.4 billion dollars) to cover an accounting fraud at Banco Pan. The loan provided by the Credit Guarantee Fund and secured by assets of the business assets of Grupo Silvio Santos, was necessary to restore the full balance sheet. The bank had continued to account for credit portfolios that had been sold to other financial institutions, thus falsifying assets.

=== Sale to BTG Pactual ===
On January 29, 2010, the Brazilian newspaper Folha de S.Paulo, announced that the shortfall of the bank was of 4.0 billion reals (2.3 billion dollars). In response Silvio Santos sold Grupo Silvio Santos's shares in the bank to BTG Pactual. The businessman did not receive any compensation, as BTG Pactual and Caixa Economica Federal assumed all the accumulated debt.

== Operations ==
Currently headquartered in São Paulo, Banco Pan is one of the largest midsize banks in Brazil. It competes with other midsize banks such as Daycoval and BicBanco.
