= Eastern Caribbean Financial Holding Company =

Saint Lucian financial company

Eastern Caribbean Financial Holding Company is a Saint Lucian financial services holding company listed on the Eastern Caribbean Securities Exchange.

== Subsidiaries ==
- Bank of Saint Lucia
- EC Global Insurance (20%)
- Bank of Saint Vincent and the Grenadines (51%)
