= Bank of Saint Lucia =

Bank in Saint Lucia

Bank of Saint Lucia is a subsidiary of Eastern Caribbean Financial Holding Company. It was formed in July 2001 as a result of the merger between National Commercial Bank and the Saint Lucia Development Bank.

Bank of Saint Lucia is the largest bank in Saint Lucia with the most expansive ATM network on the island. It has branches in Gros Islet, Vieux Fort, Soufrière, and Castries (Bridge Street and the Waterfront Areas) as well as a Bureau de Change at Hewanorra International Airport.

The current Managing Director is Rolf K. Phillips since November 01, 2020.

== Services ==
BSL provides services such as:

- Personal banking
- Corporate Banking
- Private Banking
- Insurance

== History ==
After the National Commercial Bank of St. Lucia Limited opened its doors to the public in 1981, the Saint Lucia Development Bank Limited soon followed. As the names suggest the National Commercial Bank functioned as a commercial bank satisfying the personal banking needs of customers. The Saint Lucia Development Bank on the other hand was set up to provide funding in the areas of manufacturing, agriculture, tourism and fisheries.
