= 100% Banco =

Venezuelan bank

100 Banco
- Type: Joint stock company
- Industry: Finance and Insurance
- Founded: 2006
- Headquarters: Caracas, Venezuela
- Products: Financial services
- Number of employees: 400
- Parent: Beserfin
- Website: Official web site (Spanish)

100% Banco is a privately owned commercial bank based in Caracas, Venezuela. It is owned by the Benacerraf family. As of July 2009, it has 19 branches throughout the country, mainly in the capital city of Caracas.

== History ==
The bank began as Sociedad Financiera de Lara in 1971, headquartered in Barquisimeto. In 1994 it was acquired by Financorp Financial Group, and became Financorp Banco de Inversión. In 1996, the bank's headquarters were moved to Caracas. On 26 April 2006, the bank's name was changed to Financorp, Banco Comercial. On 21 August of that year, it was sold to the Benacerraf family, who changed its name to 100% Banco and officially launched it on 1 November 2006.
