= Bancaribe =

Private bank in Venezuela

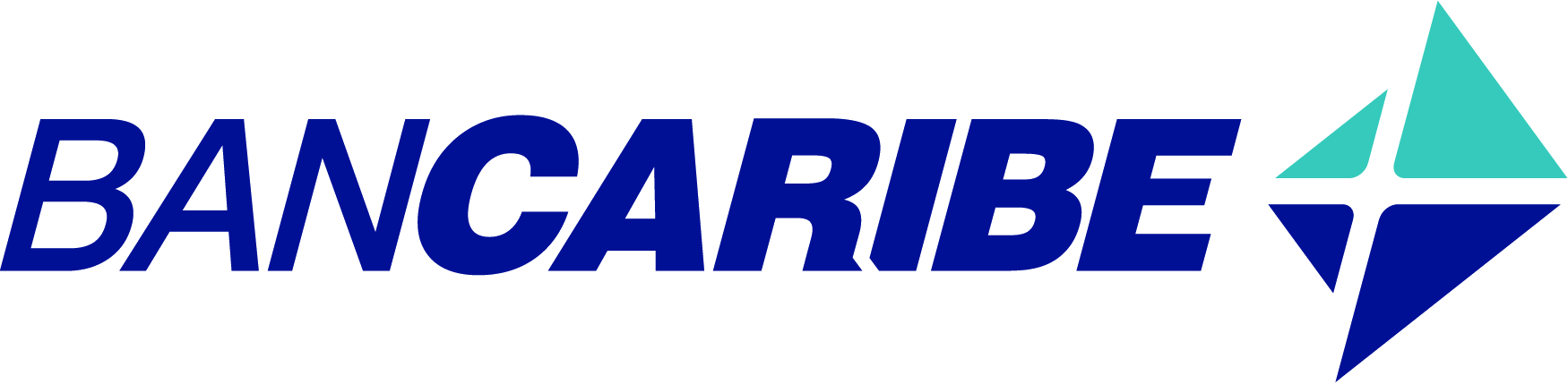

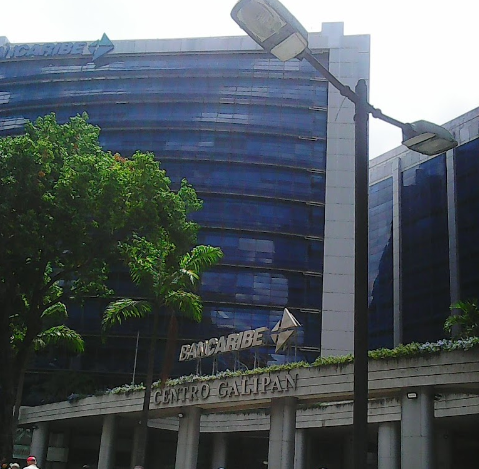
- Headquarters in Caracas.
- Type: Private company
- Industry: Financial services
- Founded: February 12, 1954; 0 days' time
- Headquarters: Caracas, Venezuela
- Key people: Juan Carlos Dao, (President) and Martín Pérez de Benedetto (Executive President)
- Products: Banking
- Number of employees: 1,500 (2019)
- Website: www.bancaribe.com.ve

Bancaribe is a private bank based in Caracas, Venezuela that operates as a universal bank. As of 2018, it was the seventh largest bank in the country and was part of the medium stratum of the Bank Ranking of the Superintendent of the Institutions of the Banking Sector of Venezuela (SUDEBAN).

As of 2018 it had 100 branches located throughout the country, more than 1,200,000 customers, about 17,000 POS terminals, and more than 1,500 employees. Its current headquarters are located in Caracas, in the Galipán Business Center.

== History ==
Banco del Caribe (as it was formerly known) was founded on February 12, 1954 with headquarters in Puerto Cabello working as a credit institution, starting the operations on November 3. In 1955, Bancaribe expanded its presence when it opened new branches in Barquisimeto and Barinas; then in 1956 it opened two more branches in Valencia, two in Morón and another one in Puerto Cabello. In 1957: San Felipe, Valle de La Pascua, Maracay, Calabozo, San Fernando de Apure, Punto Fijo, Guacara, El Tocuyo, Chivacoa and Guanare. In 1958: Caracas and Acarigua, Villa de Cura, La Victoria, Güigue and Cagua. In 1959 another branch in Caracas y one in Anaco. In 1961, Turén and Nirgua.

Bancaribe changed the headquarters located in the downtown of Caracas between 2008 and 2009, after obtaining a new building in Galipán Business Center in El Rosal, Caracas.

== Board of directors ==
In March 2018, was named the board of directors to the period 2018-2020:

- Juan Carlos Dao
- Néstor Blanco
- Javier A. Serebriski
- Martín Pérez B.
- Luis Eduardo Paul
- Eduardo Rafael Henríquez
- Arturo Ganteaume
- Carlos Hernández Delfino
- Nelson David Dao
