= Banco Occidental de Descuento =

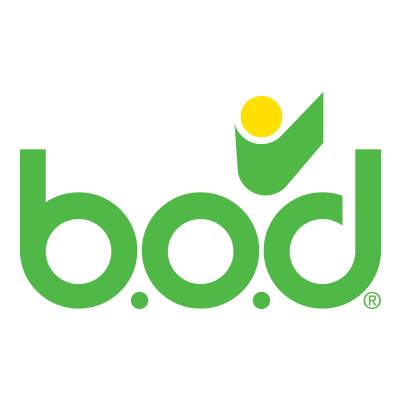
- Company type: 220
- Industry: Finance and Insurance
- Founded: 1957
- Defunct: June 23, 2022
- Headquarters: Maracaibo, Venezuela
- Key people: Victor Vargas (Chairman) Jose Manuel Egui Medina (CEO)
- Products: Financial services
- Revenue: ▲US$ 1.55 Billion May (2014)
- Net income: ▲US$ 282.8 Million May (2014)
- Total assets: ▲US$ 17.48 Billion May (2014)
- Number of employees: 6,993
- Website: www.bod.com.ve

Banco Occidental de Descuento (BOD) (English: Western Discount Bank) (WDB) was a Venezuelan bank. With around 6.6% of the Venezuelan market, it was Venezuela's fifth-largest bank in 2009.

The owner of BOD is the Grupo Financiero BOD (English: BOD Financial Group), which is owned by Venezuelan businessman Victor Vargas.

== History ==
The Banco Occidental de Descuento, S.A.C.A. (Sociedad Anónima de Capital Autorizado) (English: Authorized Capital Stock Company) was born in October 1956 with a view to supporting the activity of the commercial, oil industry and agricultural sector in the center-west of the country.

The signing of the constitutive act was carried out on January 8, 1957, to begin its commercial operations on July 26, 1957 with an office located on Calle Comercio in the center of Maracaibo, and a capital of 20 million bolívares distributed in 40 thousand registered shares.10

Its first board of directors was then formed by Francisco Morillo Romero, as president; and José Rafael Domínguez, Jorge Maisto, Francisco Martínez La Riva, John Shortt, Rafael Urdaneta, J.J. González Gorrondona and Angel Cervini. Subsequently, Banco Occidental de Discount moved to the Main Tower located on Avenida 5 de Julio in the capital of Zulia, where it remains to this day.

In 1994 the shares of the B.O.D., which ranked 28th out of 123 banking institutions that existed at the time, are acquired by the BOD HOLDING. In 2000, an expansion process began after the merger of Banco Noroco and Valencia Entidad de Ahorro y Préstamos, which gave way to Norval Bank, an entity that became part of the Grupo Financiero B.O.D.11

When in 2002 the Norval Bank merged with the Banco de Monagas and the Liquid Assets Fund B.O.D., the Western Discount Bank was constituted as Universal Bank, with a network of 143 agencies and a capital of 169 thousand 674 million bolívares.12

In September 2006, BOD HOLDING acquired Corp Banca, which since 1996 had taken control of the former Banco Consolidado. In this way, the bank's presence in the center of the country increases and the expansion process continues.

In 2007, the integration of the entire technological platform of B.O.D. and Corp Banca, and then two years later request before SUDEBAN the merger between both entities.

On September 12, 2013, under resolution 149.13, SUDEBAN approved the merger of the institutions, and as of November 1, 2013, the Corp Banca brand disappears to prevail the B.O.D. as one of the banks of the large stratum of the Venezuelan financial system

Administrative measures for subsidiaries of the BOD Financial Group At the beginning of September 2019, some institutions belonging to the BOD Financial Group received a series of administrative measures. On Thursday, September 5, the Central Bank of Curaçao suspended the regular services of Banco del Orinoco N.V., of which Luis Alfonso de Borbón,14 son-in-law of Vargas, is Alternate Director, and appointed an administrator in order to evaluate the assets and liabilities existing in the institution. A few days later, on Monday, September 9, the Superintendence of Panama intervened administratively and operationally for a period of 30 days, extendable, the bank AllBank Corp, as a preventive measure against the potential effects of contagion derived from the situation of the banking group in Curaçao.15

These actions resulted in SUDEBAN -through resolution 047.19, published on the 11th in the Official Gazette No. 41,714-, dictating administrative measures to protect and secure the funds of the users of the Banco Occidental de Discount banking entity. 16 According to the resolution, the administrative measures applied have a term of 120 bank business days and, among them, the prohibitions to make new investments and to decree payment of dividends are detailed. However, SUDEBAN stressed that the bank would continue to operate.

The president of Grupo Financiero BOD, Víctor Vargas Irausquín, offered a press conference on Thursday, September 12, in order to clarify the information that revolved around the situation of the subsidiaries of Grupo Financiero BOD and, specifically, about Banco Western Discount. In the meeting with the media, Victor Vargas denied the bank's intervention and assured that its board of directors was operating normally.

Regarding Banco del Orinoco N.V., Vargas explained to the press that, two days before the Central Bank of Curaçao took the emergency measure, its board of directors had already agreed to liquidate it, among other reasons, because Curaçao has repeatedly been singled out as one of the countries with the highest money laundering alert in the region.21 Regarding AllBank Corp, in Panama, Vargas indicated that its paralysis did not affect the BOD in Venezuela and added that the intention of the Panamanian superintendence is only to make sure that nothing abnormal happens after the decision taken in Curaçao.

The day after the statements given by Víctor Vargas Irausquín, SUDEBAN issued an explanatory circular -disseminated by the BOD in a press release on Saturday, September 14-, denying the intervention of the banking institution, since the measures applied do not include the taking of the bank's administration, which continues to be the sole responsibility of its current Board of Directors, Presidency and Executives.

Since 2019, the BNC began negotiating the purchase of the BOD.

On March 10, 2022, the Caracas Stock Exchange (BVC) released a press release informing about the expansion process of the BNC in the acquisition of some assets and assumption of liabilities of the BOD. The On June 17, SUDEBAN would inform in a statement the authorization for the transfer of assets and liabilities from the BOD to the BNC as of June 27, 2022.

In early June 2022, the BOD began removing its logo from its branches and headquarters, replacing them with the BNC logo.

On June 17, 2022, SUDEBAN authorizes the transfer of assets and liabilities from the BOD to the BNC in Venezuela.

From June 23, starting at 10:00 p.m. and until June 24, 2022, at 03:00 p.m., the electronic transactions of the BOD bank will be suspended. By June 24, from 03:01 p.m., customers will have access to their products and services through digital banking www.bncenlinea.com, maintaining optimal security and confidentiality conditions.

From June 23, starting at 10:01 p.m. and until June 24, 2022, at 08:00 a.m., operations by Bank Points of Sale will be suspended. For June 24, from 08:01 a.m., affiliated businesses will be able to activate their Points of Sale.

The Sudeban reported that the migration and integration process of the BNC's technological platform was completed on June 24, 2022, in which a total of 2,889,592 accounts were successfully migrated from the BOD.

As of June 27, during banking hours, they will be attended at the BNC Agency network nationwide, by executives and employees willing to resolve requests and answer questions from the beginning of the transition period.

The cessation of operations of the Banco Occidental de Descuento (BOD) was made official in Resolution No. 047.22 of Gazette No. 42,412 dated July 6, 2022.

According to the publication released this weekend, the Superintendency of Banking Sector Institutions (Sudeban) will grant a period of 30 continuous days from the publication in the Official Gazette of the Bolivarian Republic of Venezuela of this resolution, to finalize all the operations inherent to the Banco Occidental de Descuento, Banco Universal, CA.

Likewise, the text indicates that the banking institution will also have a period of 2 years for “its liquidation and the related legal entities; all this under the supervision and authorization of this Superintendence of the Institutions of the Banking Sector.

== Presidents of the B.O.D. ==
1957-1964 Francisco Morillo Romero 1964-1994 Alfredo Belloso 1994-1998 Jose Manuel Egui Medina 1998-2022 Victor Vargas Irausquin

== Cultural Center B.O.D. ==
The Cultural Center B.O.D. (former Consolidated Cultural Center) opened its doors to the public on November 29, 1990, and throughout its 25-year history it has become a point of reference for the enjoyment of entertainment and culture in Caracas.

In 2014, there were 920 theater performances (with 116,420 attendees), 98 concerts (with 28,834 spectators), 112 corporate events (with 43,060 participants) and 4 major art exhibitions (with 12,157 visitors). These figures add up to a total of 1,137 events attended by 204,071 people from Caracas and areas surrounding the capital.

== Disputes ==
In 2007, the bank's vice president, Tomás Casado, was arrested for being involved in the scam known as "La Vuelta", in which many families from Zulia lost their savings.

In 2016, the bank was affected by the case of cyber attacks on the Credicard payment system, of which BOD is one of its owners. Its president, Víctor Vargas, was arrested by the Sebin due to this case.

In 2019, several depositors denounced a "million-dollar scam" scheme by the bank and its international branches.

== Situation with Assets, Liabilities and Debts (External) ==
In the aforementioned resolution, the Superintendence of Institutions of the Banking Sector (SUDEBAN) clarifies exhaustively that the agreement for the transfer of assets and liabilities within the national territory between the Banco Nacional de Crédito BNC and the BOD does not imply a merger by absorption or the integration of both banking entities, so that in no case will the legal personalities of each commercial company be confused.

Next, the regulatory authority establishes that each institution will maintain its identity and its own rights and obligations on the date of the transfer.

This provision clarifies the situation of the BOD's liabilities with clients of intervened subsidiaries and in liquidation that it has abroad, so that the BNC has no responsibility for the cancellation of such credits, in accordance with the resolution issued by SUDEBAN. .

The analysis carried out prior to signing the agreement for the transfer of assets and liabilities from the BOD to the Banco Nacional de Crédito, by the Superintendence of Institutions of the Banking Sector, establishes that the patrimonial and financial situation of Banco Occidental de Descuento was complex and it was adjusted to the demands for improvement required by the regulator.

Consequently, the asset and liability transfer agreement was approved as an alternative route of the Recovery Plan, considering it viable by virtue of being an efficient procedure whose objective is to avoid the impact determined by the insufficient coverage of public deposits, given that According to the figures of the financial statements of the Banco Occidental de Descuento, Banco Universal C.A., they do not show the necessary disposition of the assets to offset the liability balances.

== Foreign subsidiaries ==
- Allbank Panama

== BOD Financial Group ==
BOD Financial owns companies in three major market sectors: banking, capital markets, and insurance.

BOD Financial-Owned Companies
Company	Location	Sector
BOD	Venezuela	Banking
Allbank	Panama	Banking
BOI Bank	Antigua and Barbuda	Banking
BONV	Curaçao	Banking
Bancamérica	Dominican Republic	Banking
BOD Valores Casa de Bolsa	Venezuela	Capital markets
Corp Casa de Bolsa	Venezuela	Capital markets
Plus Capital Markets	Panama	Capital markets
Plus Capital Markets	Dominican Republic	Capital markets
BOD Fondos Mutuales	Venezuela	Capital markets
Element Capital	Venezuela/Panama	Capital markets
La Occidental	Venezuela	Insurance
Global Care	Venezuela	Insurance
Salud Care y Planinsa	Venezuela	Insurance
National Leasing	Panama	Insurance

- BOD (Merger by absorption with the BNC)
- BONV Banco del Orinoco N.V. (In liquidation process)
- AllBank (Under intervention since September 2019 and in liquidation process)
