= National Bank of Belize =

Bank of Belize

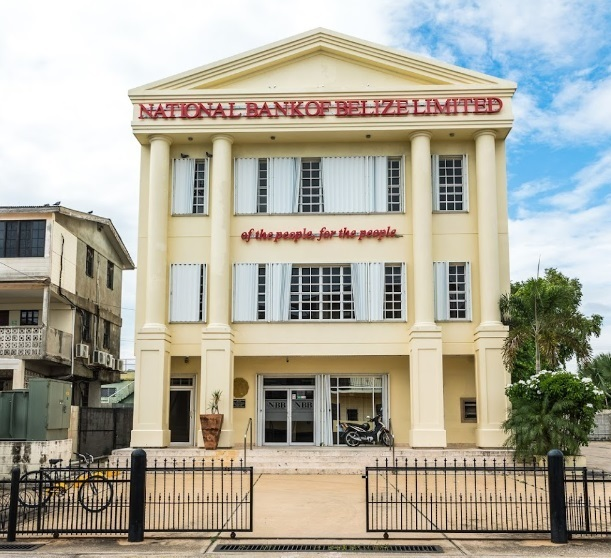
- Agency in Belmopan.

The National Bank of Belize Limited (NBBL) is a government-owned bank headquartered in Belmopan, Cayo District, Belize. With $47 million in assets (2016) it is the smallest commercial bank in Belize. National Bank of Belize Ltd. provides both retail and corporate banking products and services. The retail division offers consumer real estate products including residential mortgage loans for home purchases and refinancing needs. The bank also offers deposit accounts, business loans and other consumer and corporate lending products and services.

== History ==
The Government of Belize established the bank in April 2013 to provide low-interest credit to teachers, public officers, and the poor. With an initial capitalization of 20 million dollars, this state-owned bank opened its doors to the public on September 2, 2013. Within the first 10 months, the bank granted 12.1 million in mortgage loans. The bank’s main objective was to lower the cost of home-ownership to the Belizean public, primarily to low and middle income earners.

Jose Marin, former president of Provident Bank Belize, was hired as the first managing director; however, on March 21, 2014, with less than a year at the job, he was asked by the Board of Directors to resign with immediate effect. On March 24, 2014, with only three days after Jose Marin’s departure, Janet Arnold was named as the Deputy General Manager. With its main objective in mind and with just over two years in operation, on September 3, 2015, National Bank of Belize Ltd. opened its second branch in the old capital, Belize City. At the inauguration, General Manager, Alvaro Alamina, stated that it was imperative for the National Bank to establish a presence in what continues to be the country’s commercial hub.

== Board of directors ==
- Carla Barnett – Chairman
- Marion Palacio – Vice Chairman
- Dylan Reneau – Director
- Barbara Hall – Director

http://thebelizeherald.com/2018/04/03/national-bank-of-belize-charges-lowest-interest/

== Present ==
With three years in operation, National Bank of Belize Ltd. has suffered significant losses.
