= National Bank of Dominica =

- Type: Private Company
- Industry: Finance
- Founded: 1976; 50 years ago
- Headquarters: Roseau, Dominica
- Key people: Urania Williams (Chairperson), Annette Severin-Lestrade Managing Director)
- Products: Banking and other Financial services
- Total assets: ▲US$614.7 million (2022)
- Number of employees: 178 (2022)
- Subsidiaries: National Investment corporation
- Website: www.nbdominica.com

The National Bank of Dominica Ltd. is a financial services firm in headquartered in Roseau, Dominica. It is the largest financial institution in the Commonwealth of Dominica. The bank was set up in 1978 as a state owned bank and was privatized in 2003. It was named 2022 Bank of the Year by the Eastern Caribbean Central Bank (ECCB).

== History ==
The bank was created by Act No 27 of 1976 by the Parliament of Dominica (under the name National Commercial and Development Bank of Dominica). It officially opened for business on March 15, 1978 with the Agricultural Industrial and Development Bank (AID) bank as a wholly owned subsidiary.

In January 1982, the AID development bank was made a separate and independent entity.

In 1994, the bank invested in National Commercial Bank of Grenada, jointly, with two other Organization of Eastern Caribbean States (OECS) indigenous banks to own 12.5% of that bank. An investment in the Caribbean Credit Card Corporation for the issuance and processing of local and international credit cards was also made. Additionally, the Bank acquired shares in the newly privatized LIAT (1974) Ltd and East Caribbean Home Mortgage Bank.

By letter dated October 10, 2003, National Commercial Bank of Dominica was advised by the Government of Dominica of its decision to divest itself of its majority holding in the National Commercial Bank (NCB). This was part of Government of Dominica's strategy to privatize NCB. This decision meant that the NCB Act Chapter 74:02 was repealed and a new company, the National Bank of Dominica Ltd was incorporated to succeed the NCB.
