= Banco Nacional de Crédito =

Banco Nacional de Crédito C.A.
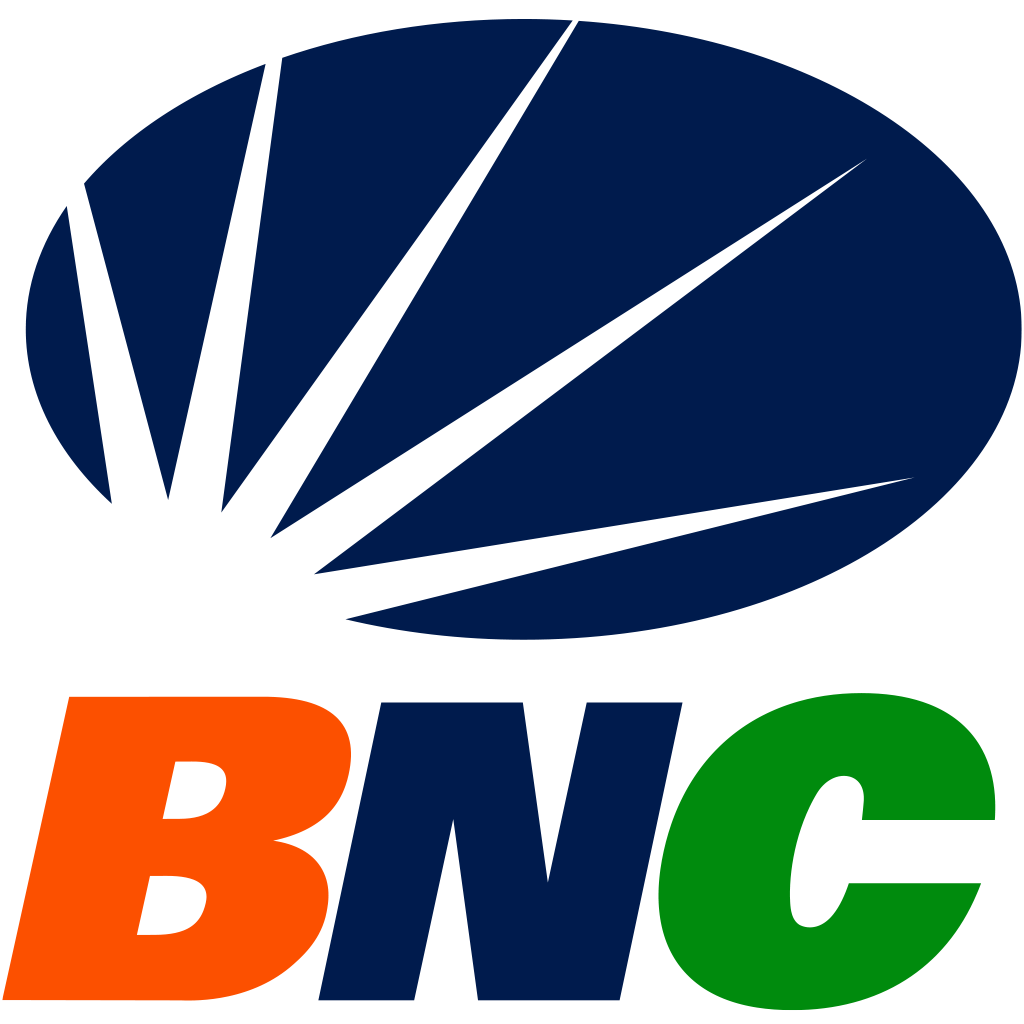

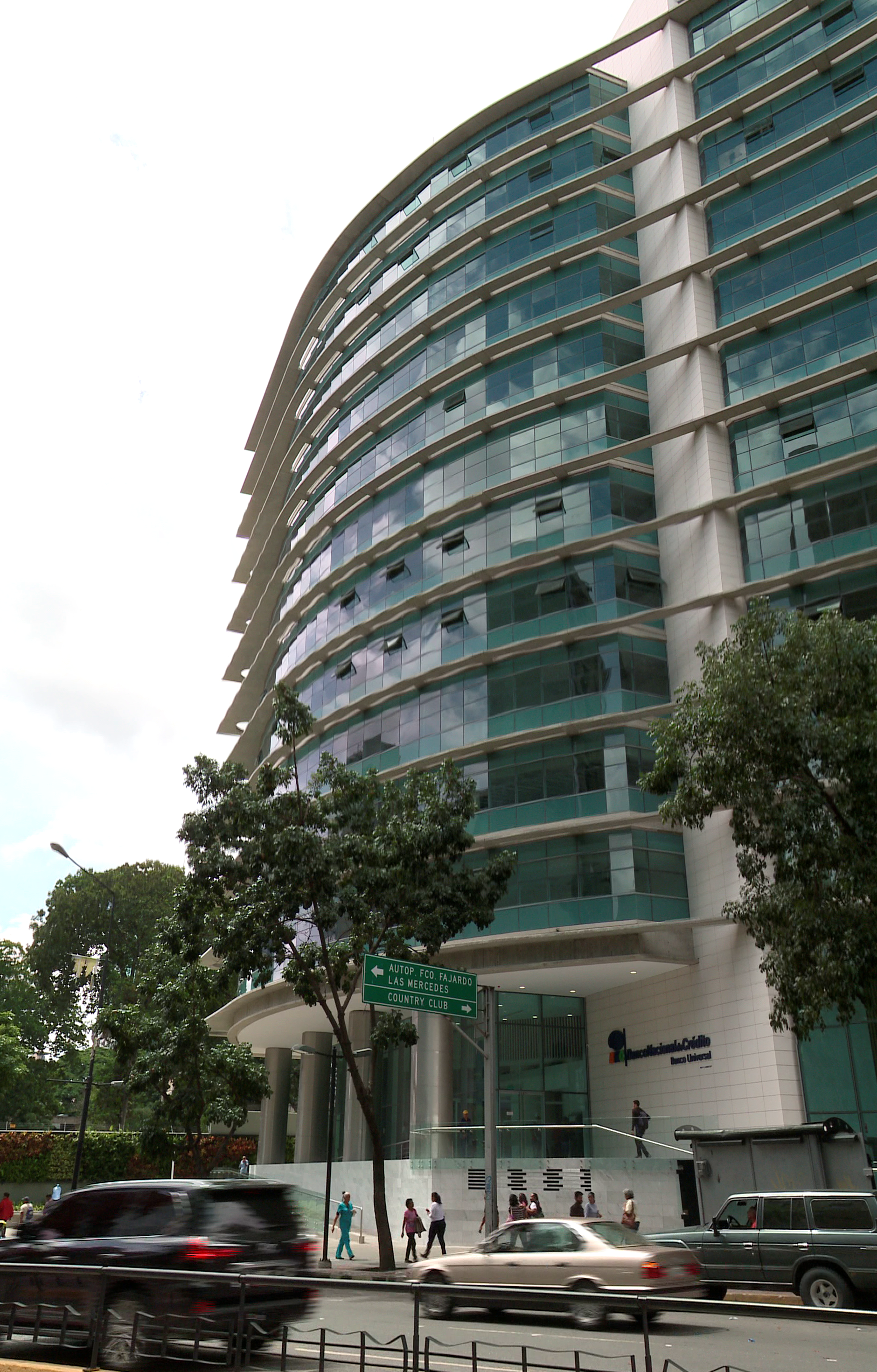
- Type: Public company
- Traded as: BVC: BNC
- Industry: Finance
- Founded: 2003; 23 years ago
- Headquarters: Caracas, Venezuela
- Products: Banking
- Website: www.bncenlinea.com

The Banco Nacional de Crédito (BNC) is a financial institution Venezuelan with private capital specialized in universal banking. It is headquartered in the El Rosal sector of Caracas.

According to the ranking of SUDEBAN, it falls within the Medium Stratum in terms of bank size. Its founding president is Jorge Nogueroles, who long before had served as vice president of the Provincial Bank. His catchphrase is Where you hit right at the bank.

== History ==
It opens its doors in San Antonio del Táchira, Táchira State in July 1977, as Banco Tequendama branch of the bank of the same name in Colombia.

In 2002, talks began for the purchase of the bank by a group of Venezuelan investors, completing the acquisition of the bank in February 2003 and changing the name in April of the same year to Banco Nacional. of Credit.

By 2003, it had 13 agencies. By mid-2007 the number increased significantly to reach 79 agencies nationwide. Five years later it would reach 156 agencies and approximately 687,372 clients. It currently has 171 agencies nationwide, 460 ATMs and approximately 1,417,932 customers. On May 8, 2009, the BNC acquired all the shares of Stanford Bank for $111 million dollars, after this was intervened by the Venezuelan State, after the crisis of its parent company, and it took place on February 18. At the time of the purchase Stanford Bank owned 15 branches in Venezuela.

On August 31, 2021, Citibank Venezuela would complete the transfer of its assets and liabilities to the BNC, in accordance with a Rights and Obligations Transfer Agreement dated April 20, 2021, after the approval of the Superintendency of Institutions of the Banking Sector (SUDEBAN) between both institutions. Citigroup's withdrawal occurred due to the minimization of its activities due to the economic recession caused by the hyperinflation in the nation.

On March 10, 2022, the Caracas Stock Exchange (BVC) released a press release informing about the expansion process of the BNC in the acquisition of some assets and assumption of liabilities of the Banco Occidental de Descuento. The On June 17, SUDEBAN would inform in a statement the authorization for the transfer of assets and liabilities from the BOD to the BNC as of June 27, 2022.
