= Banco Federal =

- Industry: Finance and Insurance
- Founded: 1982
- Defunct: 2010
- Headquarters: Caracas, Venezuela
- Products: Financial services

Banco Federal was a Venezuelan bank based in Caracas. At the end of April 2010 it was the country's 11th-largest bank, with deposits of 7.66 billion bolivars, or 2.82 percent of total deposits in the banking system. In June 2010 the bank was taken over by Venezuela's banking regulator. It had been told to expand its capital base by 1.5bn bolivars (around $350m), and had only raised B100m. At least 12 other banks had been taken over since November 2009 after speculation about bank insolvency.

On 14 June 2010 Victor Vargas, head of Venezuela's National Banking Council, indicated that he supported the takeover. "Vargas said he's sorry the takeover of Banco Federal had to occur but indicated he supported the government action by saying that sometimes interventions are necessary to keep the overall banking system running smoothly." Banco Federal is to be liquidated by the government.

Banco Federal's President Nelson Mezerhane owned a 25.8% stake in TV station Globovisión. After the state intervention, the government took over the Globovisión stake.
