= Stanford Bank Venezuela =

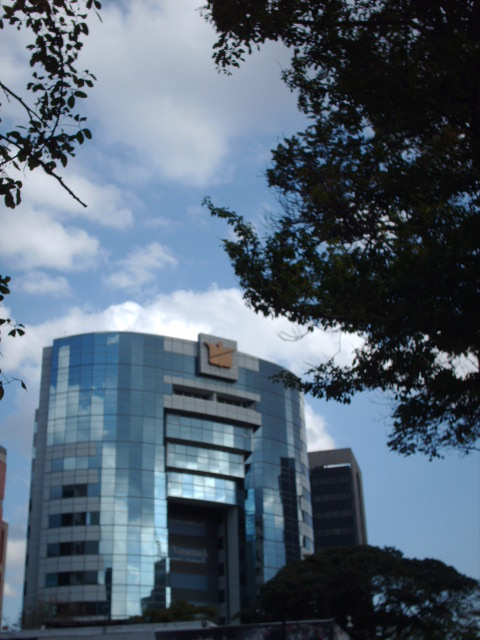
Stanford Bank Tower in Caracas

Stanford Bank Venezuela was Stanford International Bank's subsidiary in Venezuela.

== History ==
It was headquartered in Caracas and had several branches throughout Venezuela. The Venezuelan banking regulator estimated that Venezuelans had placed around $2.5bn in deposits with Stanford International. Stanford Bank Venezuela (SBV) was a subsidiary holding company of Stanford International, operating and licensed accorded the laws and regulations within Venezuela. Currency inflation and lack of liquidity prompted a run on several Venezuelan banks including SBV, forcing the government of Venezuela to intervene.

In May 2009 the Stanford Bank Venezuela was sold to Banco Nacional de Crédito for $111 m, with the bank being merged into BNC.
