= BANDES =

The Venezuelan Economic and Social Development Bank (Spanish: Banco de Desarrollo Económico y Social de Venezuela, BANDES) is a Venezuelan federal public company, sanctioned by the US Department of Treasury, that is associated with the Ministry of Finance. It serves as a bank focused on financing projects that contribute toward the development of Venezuela. It was founded in 2001. It has subsidiaries that are based in Venezuela, Uruguay and Bolivia; the subsidiaries are Banco Bandes Uruguay, Banco Bicentenario del Pueblos, Banco Universal SA Banco de Venezuela, and Banco Prodem SA, of Bolivia.

== History ==
In 2007, BANDES contributed $2 billion, along with China Development Bank's $4 billion, to create the China-Venezuela Joint Fund. The fund's goal is to offer capital for infrastructure projects in Venezuela to be built by Chinese companies.

China Development Bank has paid billions of dollars through BANDES to the Venezuelan government in exchange for crude oil. In 2019, Nicolás Maduro attempted to move over US$1 billion from Venezuela to Banco Bandes Uruguay. Alejandro Andrade—BANDES former president—is serving a ten-year sentence after pleading guilty in Florida to accepting millions of dollars in bribes.

== Sanctions ==
Just hours after the Bolivarian Intelligence Service (SEBIN) detained attorney Roberto Marrero—Juan Guaidó's chief of staff—during the 2019 Venezuelan presidential crisis, the United States Department of the Treasury responded on 22 March 2019 by placing sanctions on BANDES and four of its subsidiaries. The Maduro administration issued a statement saying that it "energetically rejects the unilateral, coercive, arbitrary and illegal measures" that would affect banking for millions of people.

The sanctions mean that "all property and interests in property of these entities, and of any entities that are owned, directly or indirectly, 50 percent or more by this entity, that are in the United States or in the possession or control of U.S. persons are blocked" and they "prohibit all dealings by U.S. persons or within (or transiting) the United States that involve any property or interests in property of blocked or designated persons." Prohibition on credit card processing through the sanctioned banks would begin in March 2020.

US National Security Advisor John Bolton tweeted, "BANDES bank is to Venezuela's financial sector what PDVSA is to its oil sector. This action will severely affect any attempted currency movements by Maduro and his cronies moving forward." Bolton told Univision the sanctions were a direct response to Marrero's arrest. Univision said this action "put 'the entire banking sector' on notice" that "persons operating in Venezuela's financial sector may be subject to sanctions."

Treasury Secretary Steven Mnuchin said, "The willingness of Maduro's inner-circle to exploit Venezuela’s institutions knows no bounds. Regime insiders have transformed BANDES and its subsidiaries into vehicles to move funds abroad in an attempt to prop up Maduro. Maduro and his enablers have distorted the original purpose of the bank, which was founded to help the economic and social well-being of the Venezuelan people, as part of a desperate attempt to hold onto power." Mnuchin warned, "The regime's continued use of kidnapping, torture, and murder of Venezuelan citizens will not be tolerated by the U.S. or the international coalition that is united behind President Guaido. Roberto Marrero and other political prisoners must be released immediately."

== See also ==
- The Women's Development Bank
