= Banco Digital de los Trabajadores =

Bank based in Caracas

BDT Banco Digital de los Trabajadores, Banco Universal C.A.
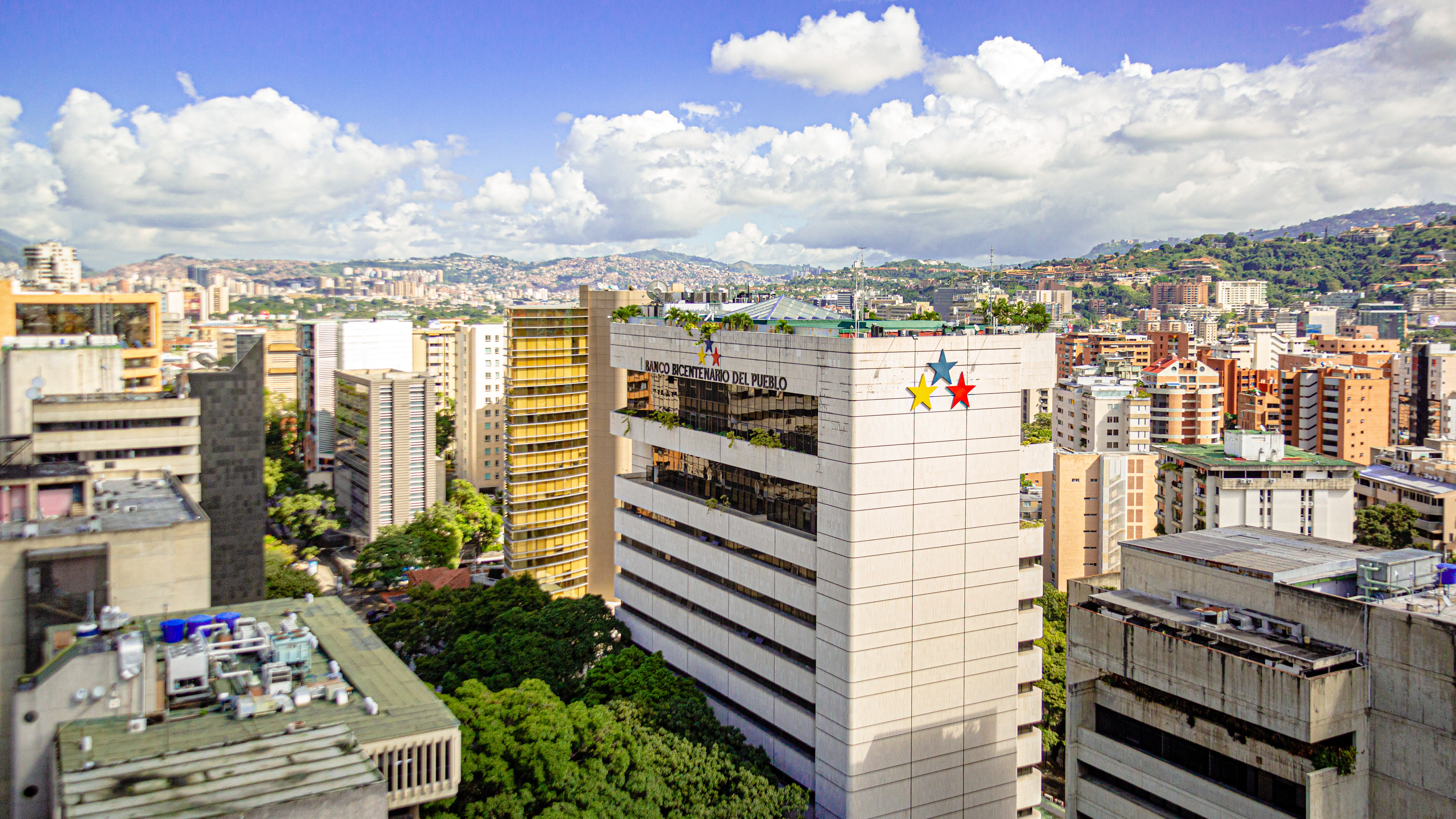
- Bicentennial Bank Tower
- Founded: 2009
- Headquarters: Caracas, Venezuela
- Products: Financial services

BDT Banco Digital de los Trabajadores, Banco Universal C.A. (previously Banco Bicentenario, Banco Universal C.A) is a bank based in Caracas. It was created in late 2009 through the merger with the existing state-owned bank Banfoandes, the banks Bolívar, Central and Confederado and after BaNorte Bank, nationalised as a result of the 2009 banking crisis. The new bank holds around 20% of Venezuelan bank deposits.

== See also ==
- Venezuelan banking crisis of 1994
