= Women's Development Bank =

- Native name: Spanish: Banco Nacional de la Mujer
- Industry: Banking
- Founded: 2001; 25 years ago
- Key people: Nora Castañeda (president)

The Women's Development Bank (Spanish: Banco Nacional de la Mujer or Banmujer), was established in Venezuela in 2001 to remedy the political, economic, and social disadvantages faced by women. The Bank offers both financial and non-financial services to women. The first President was Nora Castañeda. It provides small, low-interest loans to groups of women and offers administrative training.

== Financial services ==
The bank provides small, low-interest loans, known as micro-credit loans, ranging from 500,000 to 1,000,000 bolívares (500 to 1000 bolívares fuertes, US$260 to $520) per woman, for the establishment of business ventures. Loans are not granted to individuals, but rather to groups of five to ten women. In this manner, the bank is ideologically aligned with President Hugo Chávez, by promoting community solidarity over individualism, which is associated with capitalism. The bank has provided over 40,000 such loans since its establishment. The bank also offers financial advice to women, and serves as a consultant in the formation and development of business projects.

== Non-financial services ==
The Women's Development Bank also offers a number of non-financial services. The bank provides administrative training for aspiring female entrepreneurs, as well as workshops on personal development, self-esteem, family planning and health. The workshops encourage dialogue within the community and stimulate a greater involvement of women in politics.

The Bank is distinct from other banks in that it does not have branch offices; rather, it consists of a network of supporters who visit 149 impoverished and over-populated areas on a weekly basis, and offer the bank's services to women who otherwise would not have access to banking services. Bank members also make house calls.

The Bank attempts to promote self-sufficiency, by minimizing the requirements to receive a loans. The bank offers direction to encourage the success of women's projects, but does not dictate how their businesses should be run. This presents a challenge to many marginalized women who are illiterate. In instances where women are illiterate or otherwise have difficulty in overseeing a business venture, a female family member or friend will oversee the project until the woman becomes literate. The Bank also directs women to Mission Robinson, a literacy campaign launched by Chávez's government.

== See also ==
- Bolivarian Revolution
- Economic policy of the Hugo Chávez government
