= List of companies of Colombia =

Location of Colombia

Colombia is a transcontinental country largely situated in the northwest of South America, with territories in Central America. Colombia shares a border to the northwest with Panama, to the east with Venezuela and Brazil and to the south with Ecuador and Peru. It shares its maritime limits with Costa Rica, Nicaragua, Honduras, Jamaica, the Dominican Republic and Haiti. It is a unitary, constitutional republic comprising thirty-two departments.

Colombia is the third most populous country in Latin America. Its major industries include textiles, food processing, petroleum, clothing and footwear, consumer appliances, beverages, chemicals, cement, automobiles, gold, coal, and emeralds

For further information on the types of business entities in this country and their abbreviations, see "Business entities in Colombia".

== Notable firms ==
This list includes notable companies with primary headquarters located in the country. The industry and sector follow the Industry Classification Benchmark taxonomy. Organizations which have ceased operations are included and noted as defunct.

Notable companies Status: P=Private, S=State; A=Active, D=Defunct
Name	Industry	Sector	Headquarters	Founded	Notes	Status	
Acerias Paz del Rio	Industrials	Steel factory	Sogamoso	1948	Steel factory	P	A
AeroAndina	Industrials	Aerospace	Cali	1971	Aircraft	P	A
Aerolínea de Antioquia	Consumer services	Airlines	Medellín	1987	Regional airline, defunct 2019	P	D
Aerosucre	Industrials	Delivery services	Bogotá	1969	Cargo airline	P	A
AKT motos	Consumer goods	Automobiles	Envigado	2004	Motorcycles	P	A
Alpina Productos Alimenticios	Consumer goods	Food products	Bogotá	1945	Dairy, food, beverage	P	A
Alquería	Consumer goods	Food products	Bogotá	1958	Dairy, food, beverage	P	A
Arcadia	Consumer services	Publishing	Bogotá	2005	Monthly magazine, Defunct, 2020	P	D
Auteco	Consumer goods	Automobiles	Medellín	1941	Motor vehicle manufacturer	P	A
Avianca	Consumer services	Airlines	Bogotá	1919	Airline	P	A
Avianca Cargo	Industrials	Delivery services	Medellín	1973	Cargo airline	P	A
Avianca Holdings	Industrials	Delivery services	Bogotá	2010	Airlines, transportation, cargo	P	A
Banco AV Villas	Financials	Banks	Bogotá	1972	Bank, part of Grupo Aval Acciones y Valores	P	A
Banco de Bogotá	Financials	Banks	Bogotá	1870	Commercial bank	P	A
Banco de Occidente	Financials	Banks	Cali	1965	Bank	P	A
Bancolombia	Financials	Banks	Medellín	1945	Commercial bank	P	A
Bank of the Republic (Colombia)	Financials	Banks	Bogotá	1880	The central bank of Colombia	S	A
Bavaria Brewery	Consumer goods	Brewers	Bogotá	1889	Brewery, part of Anheuser-Busch InBev (Belgium)	P	A
Busscar de Colombia	Consumer goods	Bus	Pereira	2003	Buses bodies	P	A
Cambio	Consumer services	Publishing	Bogotá	1993	Monthly magazine, defunct 2010	P	D
Caracol Radio	Consumer services	Broadcasting & entertainment	Medellín	1948	Radio network	P	A
Caracol Televisión	Consumer services	Broadcasting & entertainment	Bogotá	1954	Broadcaster	P	A
Carulla	Consumer services	Food retailers & wholesalers	Bogotá	1905	Supermarket, part of Grupo Éxito	P	A
Citytv Bogotá	Consumer services	Broadcasting & entertainment	Bogotá	1999	Television station	P	A
Claro Colombia	Telecommunications	Mobile telecommunications	Bogotá	1996	Mobile phones, part of América Móvil (Mexico)	P	A
Clic Air	Consumer services	Airlines	Bogotá	2006	Regional airline	P	A
Colombia Móvil	Telecommunications	Mobile telecommunications	Bogotá	2002	Mobile phones	P	A
Colombia Stock Exchange	Financials	Investment services	Bogotá	1928	Primary stock exchange	P	A
Colombina	Consumer goods	Food products	Bogotá	1927	Candies and cookies	P	A
Colpatria	Financials	Banks	Bogotá	1955	Commercial bank, part of Scotiabank	P	A
Compañía Colombiana Automotriz	Consumer goods	Automobiles	Bogotá	1982	Automotive, defunct 2014	P	D
Copa Airlines Colombia	Consumer services	Airlines	Bogotá	2010	Airline	P	A
Corficolombiana	Financials	Specialty finance	Bogotá	1945	Financial services, part of Banco de Bogotá	P	A
COTECMAR	Industrials	Defense	Cartagena	2000	Naval shipbuilding, research and defense	S	A
Crepes & Waffles	Consumer services	Restaurants & bars	Bogotá	1980	Restaurant chain	P	A
Cromos	Consumer services	Publishing	Bogotá	1916	Weekly magazine	P	A
Davivienda	Financials	Banks	Bogotá	1972	Bank	P	A
Dinero	Consumer services	Publishing	Bogotá	1993	Monthly publication, defunct 2021	P	D
Ecopetrol	Oil & gas	Exploration & production	Bogotá	1921	Petroleum	P	A
El Colombiano	Consumer services	Publishing	Medellín	1912	Newspaper	P	A
El Espectador	Consumer services	Publishing	Bogotá	1887	Newspaper	P	A
El Heraldo	Consumer services	Publishing	Barranquilla	1933	Newspaper	P	A
El Siglo	Consumer services	Publishing	Bogotá	1925	Newspaper	P	A
El País	Consumer services	Publishing	Cali	1950	Newspaper	P	A
El Tiempo	Consumer services	Publishing	Bogotá	1911	Newspaper	P	A
El Universal	Consumer services	Publishing	Cartagena	1948	Newspaper	P	A
Emcali	Utilities	Water	Cali	1931	State-owned utility	S	A
Empresas Públicas de Medellín	Utilities	Multiutilities	Medellín	1955	Electricity, gas, water, sanitation, and telecommunications.	S	A
ETB	Telecommunications	Fixed line telecommunications	Bogotá	1884	Telecommunications	P	A
Fox Telecolombia	Consumer services	Broadcasting & entertainment	Bogotá	1995	Television productions	P	A
Frisby	Consumer services	Restaurants & bars	Pereira	1983	Restaurant chain	P	A
FSS	Consumer goods	Clothing & accessories	Bogotá	1987	Sports apparel	P	A
GM Colmotores	Consumer goods	Automobiles	Bogotá	1956	Significant General Motors (USA) subsidiary, defunct 2024	P	D
Grupo Argos	Industrials	Building materials & fixtures	Medellín	1936	Cement	P	A
Grupo Aval Acciones y Valores	Conglomerates	Holding	Medellín	1936	Banking, telecom, real estate	P	A
Grupo Editorial Norma	Consumer services	Publishing	Bogotá	1960	Book publisher	P	A
Grupo Éxito	Consumer services	Broadline retailers	Medellín	1949	Retail stores	P	A
Grupo Nutresa	Consumer goods	Food products	Medellín	1920	Confectionery	P	A
Grupo Sura	Conglomerates	Holding	Medellín	1945	financial and insurance	P	A
HACEB	Industrials	Industrial machinery	Medellín	1940	Industrial equipment	P	A
Hamburguesas El Corral	Consumer services	Restaurants & bars	Bogotá	1983	Fast food	P	A
Helados La Fresita	Consumer goods	Food products	Medellín	1986	Frozen foods	P	A
Indumil	Industrials	Defense	Bogotá	1954	Military weapons manufacturer	S	A
InterBolsa	Financials	Investment services	Bogotá	1990	Financial services, defunct 2012	P	D
Interconexión Eléctrica	Utilities	Multiutilities	Medellín	1967	Electricity	S	A
Jeno's Pizza	Consumer services	Restaurants & bars	Bogotá	1973	Pizza chain, now part of Telepizza (Spain)	P	A
Jet-Set	Consumer services	Publishing	Bogotá	1998	Magazine, defunct 2020	P	D
JGB	Consumer services	Chemical products	Cali	1875	Pharmaceutical and hygiene	P	A
Juan Valdez Café	Consumer services	Restaurants & bars	Bogotá	2002	Coffee house	P	A
LATAM Cargo Colombia	Industrials	Delivery services	Bogotá	2009	Cargo airline, part of LATAM Airlines Group (Chile)	P	A
Líneas Aéreas Suramericanas	Industrials	Delivery services	Bogotá	1972	Cargo airline	P	A
Loggro	Technology	Software	Medellín	2020	Software, Financial Technology	P	A
Manuelita	Consumer goods	Farming & fishing	Cali	1864	Agriculture	P	A
Maravillas de Colombia S.A.	Consumer goods	Recreational products	Bucaramanga	1899	Fireworks	P	A
Masivo Integrado de Occidente (MIO)	Consumer services	Travel & tourism	Cali	2009	Bus transit	P	A
Medellín Metro	Consumer services	Travel & tourism	Medellín	1995	Bus transit	P	A
Miguel Caballero	Consumer goods	Clothing & accessories	Bogotá	1992	Bulletproof clothing	P	A
National Guarantees Fund	Financials	Banks	Bogotá	1982	Commercial lender	P	A
Noel	Consumer goods	Food products	Medellín	1916	Cookies and crackers, part of Grupo Nutresa	P	A
Odinsa	Industrials	Construction & materials	Bogotá	1992	Construction	P	A
Organización Ardila Lülle	Conglomerates	Holding	Bogotá	1951	Communications, beverages, textiles, entertainment	P	A
Organizacion Corona	Consumer goods	Furnishings	Bogotá	1881	Ceramics	P	A
Occidental Petroleum	Oil & gas	Exploration & production	Bogotá	1920	Petroleum	P	A
Postobón	Consumer goods	Soft drinks	Medellín	1904	Beverage	P	A
Productora de Software	Technology	Software	Medellín	1984	Software	P	A
Productos Ramo	Consumer goods	Food products	Bogotá	1964	Snack foods	P	A
Quala	Consumer goods	Food products	Bogotá	1980	Food, beverages, personal care products	P	A
Rappi	Technology	Software	Bogotá	2015	Online food ordering, financial technology and e-commerce application	P	A
RCN TV	Consumer services	Broadcasting & entertainment	Bogotá	1967	Television network	P	A
RTI Producciones	Consumer services	Broadcasting & entertainment	Bogotá	1963	Television production	P	A
Saeta	Consumer goods	Clothing & accessories	Bogotá	1982	Textile brand	P	A
SATENA	Consumer services	Airlines	Bogotá	1962	Government airline	S	A
Semana	Consumer services	Publishing	Bogotá	1946	Weekly magazine	P	A
Sofasa	Consumer goods	Automobiles	Envigado	1969	Automotive	P	A
SoHo	Consumer services	Publishing	Bogotá	1999	Magazine	P	A
Tecnoquímicas	Consumer services	Chemical products	Cali	1934	Pharmaceutical and hygiene	P	A
Telecaribe	Consumer services	Broadcasting & entertainment	Barranquilla	1986	Regional television network	S	A
Telefónica Colombia	Telecommunications	Fixed line telecommunications	Bogotá	1947	Telecommunications	P	A
Telepacífico	Consumer services	Broadcasting & entertainment	Cali	1986	Television network	S	A
Terpel	Oil & gas	Exploration & production	Bogotá	1968	Gas/oil	P	A
TransMilenio	Consumer services	Travel & toruism	Bogotá	2000	Public transit	P	A
Vanguardia Liberal	Consumer services	Publishing	Bucaramanga	1919	Newspaper	P	A
Viva Air Colombia	Consumer services	Airlines	Medellín	2009	Airline, defunct 2023	P	D
Wingo	Consumer services	Airlines	Bogotá	2016	Airline	P	A
Win Sports	Consumer services	Broadcasting & entertainment	Bogotá	2012	Sports network	P	A

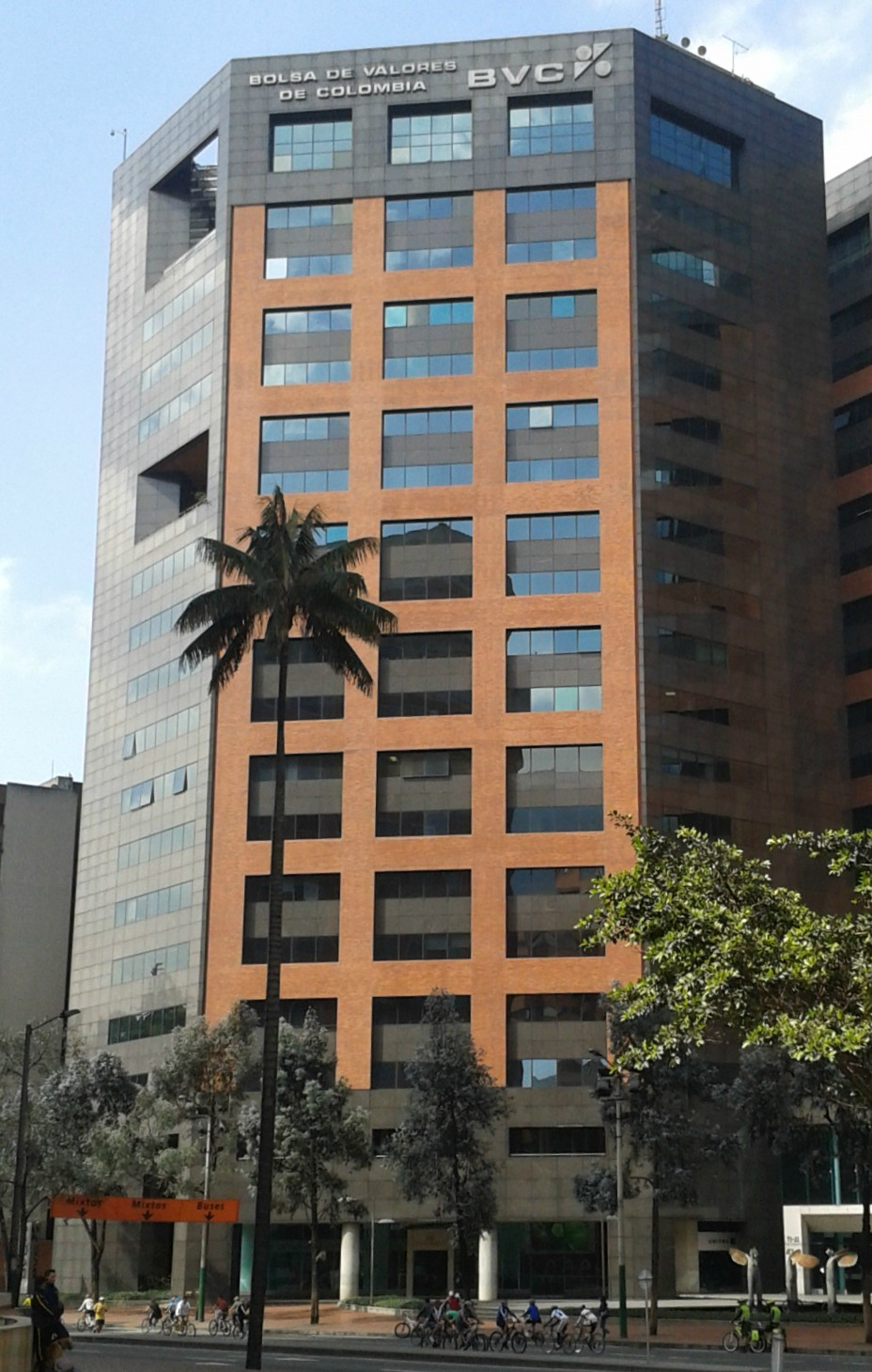
The Colombian Stock Exchange.

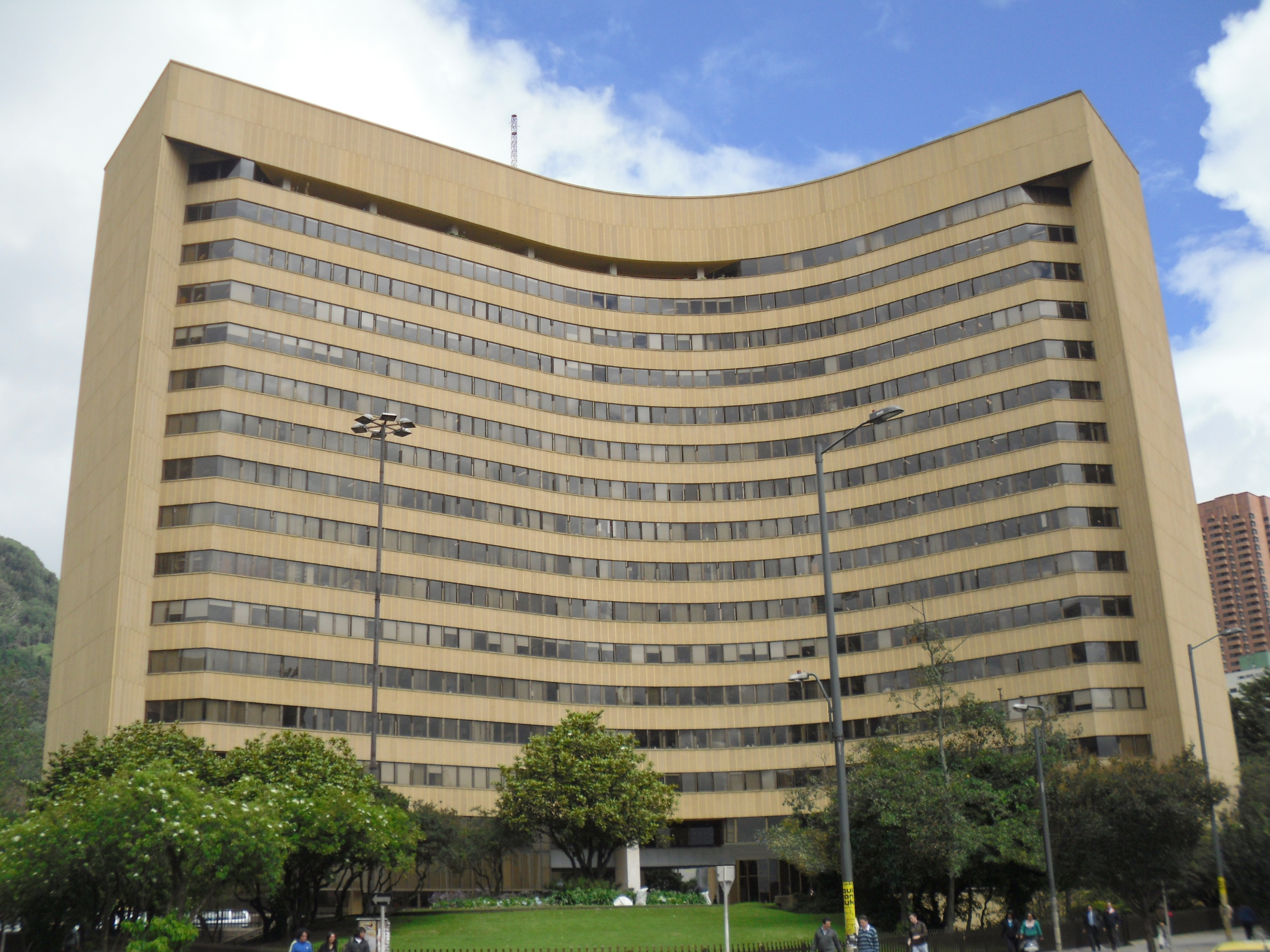
Banco de Bogotá headquarters in Bogotá.

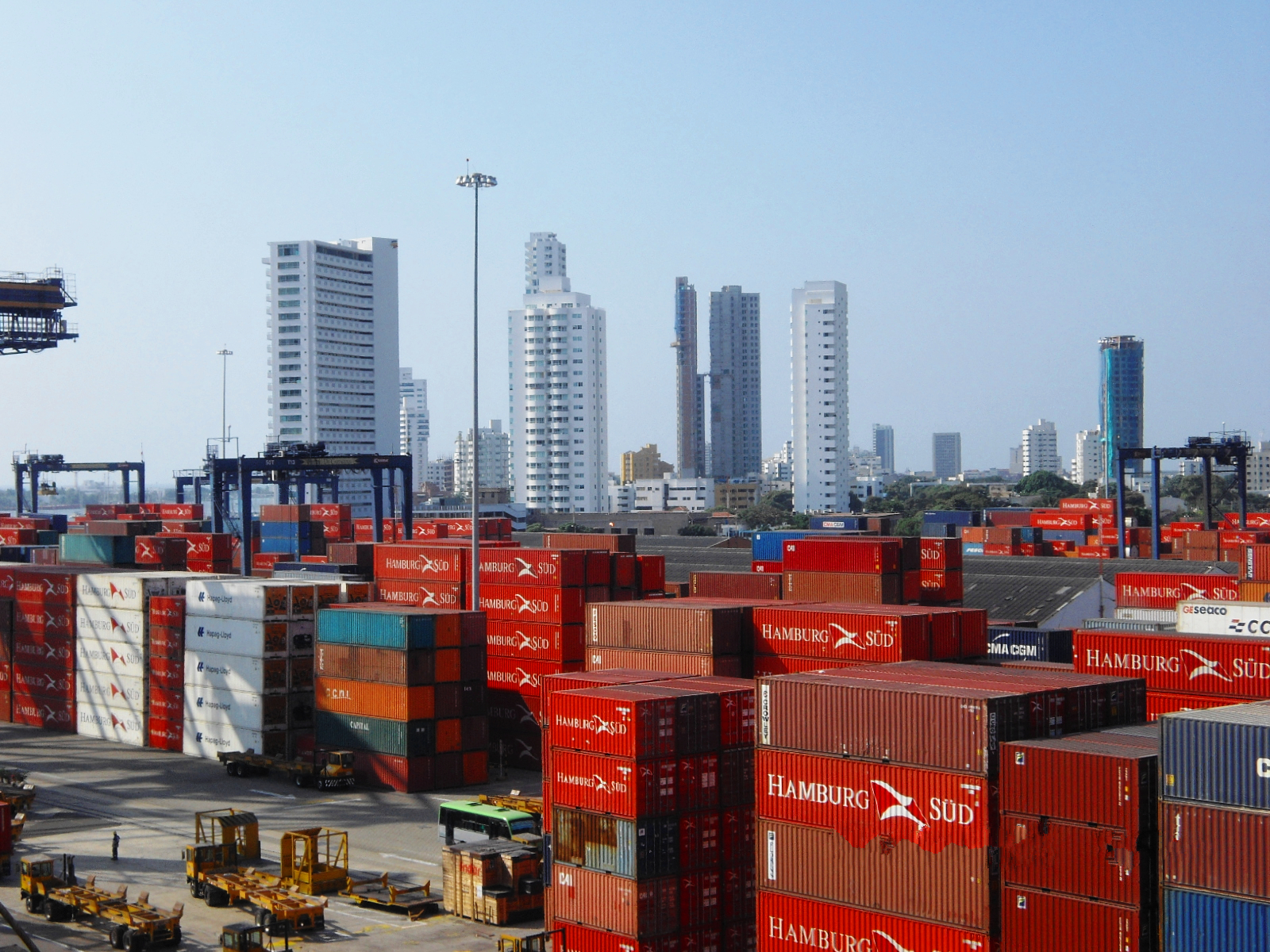
Port of Cartagena.

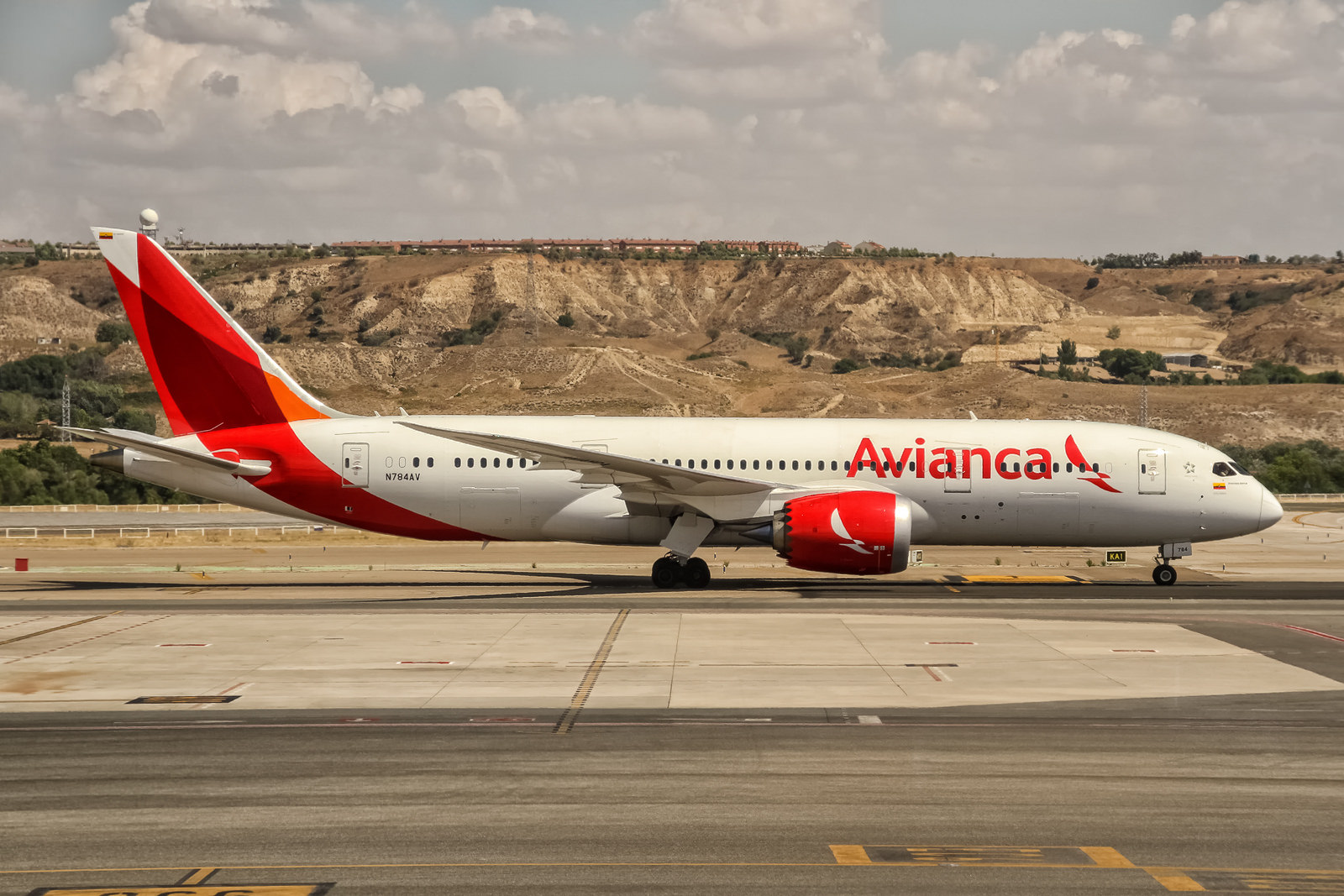
Avianca Boeing 787-8 Dreamliner.

== See also ==
- Bolsa de Valores de Colombia
- Superintendency of Corporations
