= A Toda Hora =

Colombian interbank network

A Toda Hora (ATM Network)
- Operating area: Colombia
- Members: 4 in Colombia
- Website: www.ath.com.co

The ATH/A Toda Hora S.A. Network is an interbank network connecting the ATMs of various financial institutions in Colombia (Banco de Bogotá, Banco de Occidente Credencial, Banco Popular and Banco AV Villas).

ATH/A Toda Hora S.A. also serves as a credit and debit card network for ATH-linked ATM cards. ATH currently has an agreement with the Mastercard, Maestro, Cirrus, Visa Electron, and other banking networks to accept their cards in other countries' ATM network.

ATH is based in Bogotá, Colombia and is owned and operated by Aval Group Inc. Its official acronym stands for At All Times.

== See also ==
- ATM usage fees
