= Centro Mayor =

Centro Mayor Mall
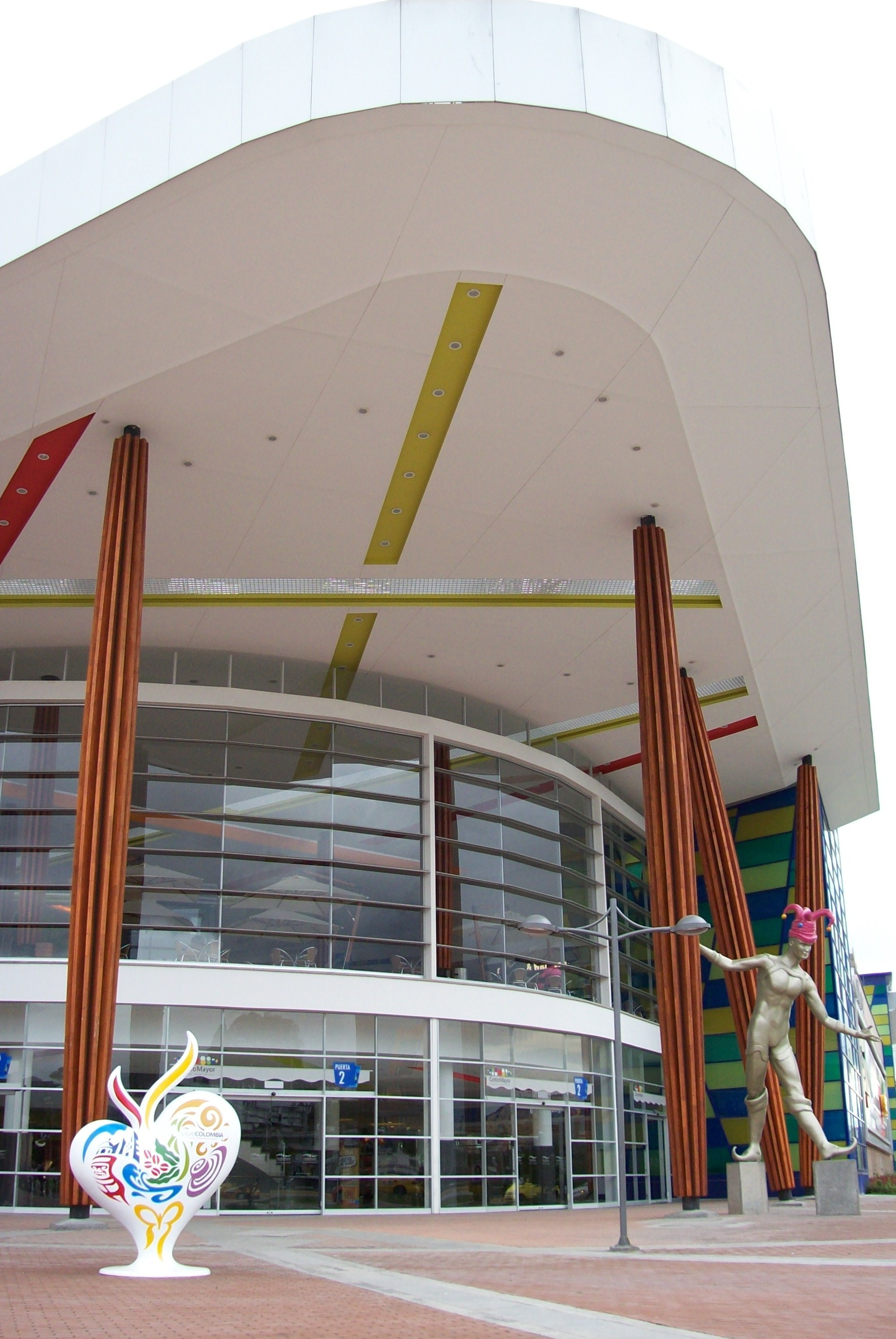
- Centro Mayor Mall
- Location: Bogotá, Colombia
- Coordinates: 4°35′30″N 74°07′26″W
- Address: Autopista Sur con Calle 38 A sur
- Opened: March 26, 2010
- Num. of stores: 430
- Num. of anchor tenants: 4 (Exito, Falabella (retail store), La Polar, Easy)
- Floor area: 248,000 m^{2} (2,670,000 sq ft)
- Floors: 3
- Parking: 3000
- Website: centromayorcc.com

Centro Mayor is a shopping mall located in the south of Bogotá, Colombia. It was inaugurated on March 26, 2010. The mall has 248,000 m^{2} (2,667,000 sq ft) of built area, being the biggest mall in Colombia and the second one in Latin America, behind the Centro Comercial Aricanduva, in São Paulo, Brazil.

== Shops ==
Centro Mayor contains a variety of shops including the four anchor stores (three of them Chilean retail stores) La Polar, H&M, Easy, Exito and Falabella. Also it contains shops such as: McDonald's, Bancolombia, Telepizza, Hamburguesas El Corral, Crepes & Waffles, Baskin-Robbins and Dunkin' Donuts, among others.
