= Plaza Bocagrande =

Skyscraper in Cartagena, Colombia

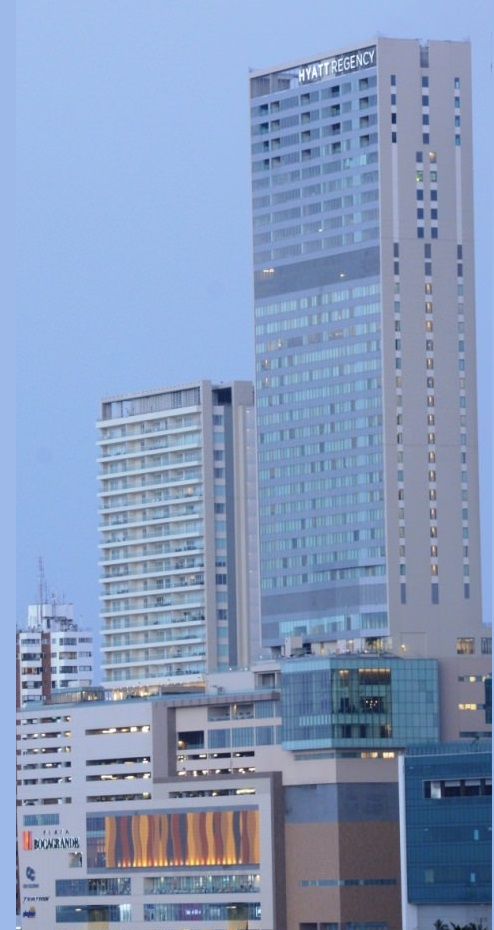
- Interactive map of the Plaza Bocagrande area

General information
- Status: Completed
- Type: Mixed-use: Residential / Hotel
- Location: Cartagena, Colombia, Cra. 1 #12-118, Bocagrande, Cartagena Province, Bolívar, Colombia
- Coordinates: 10.41053°N 75.55145°W
- Construction started: 2014
- Completed: 2017
- Owner: Hyatt Hotels Corporation

Height
- Roof: 190 m (620 ft)

Technical details
- Structural system: Reinforced concrete
- Floor count: 44

Design and construction
- Architect: Chapman Taylor LLP
- Structural engineer: Arup Group

Plaza Bocagrande also known as Hyatt Regency Cartagena is a mixed-use skyscraper in the Bocagrande district of Cartagena, Colombia. Built between 2014 and 2017, the tower stands at 190 m (620 ft) tall with 44 floors and is the current 6th tallest building in Colombia and the 2nd tallest in Cartagena.

== History ==
=== Architecture ===
The tower is located on the shores of the Colombian Caribbean zone, in the Bocagrande district of Cartagena. It consists of a shopping center carrying the same name and the Hyatt Regency Cartagena hotel, the best and most modern hotel in Cartagena de Indias and one of the tallest skyscrapers in both Colombia and South America.

The project's groundbreaking was hit in 2014 and the site construction ended in 2017. It has a total of 261 rooms and 74 tourist rentable apartments. With 190 meters in height, the main tower is officially called "Hyatt Regency Cartagena" and is the second tallest in the city after Hotel Estelar, and the eighth tallest in the entire country. To the north of the main tower is an annex skyscraper called h2, which also belongs to the Plaza Bocagrande complex. This one has also been completed, it measures 102 meters and has 28 floors. 5 Together, the two towers cost 240 million dollars.

The design of both towers was managed by Chapman Taylor LLP. To date, these are the tallest buildings built by the British architectural firm. The development and conception of the work were entrusted to the firms Ospinas & Cía. and Taller de Arquitectura de Bogotá. Bilkie Llinás Design developed the interior design.

Just south of Calle 12 is the Hotel Estelar, the tallest building in the city. Together with it, the two towers of the Plaza Bocagrande complex have redefined the Bocagrande neighborhood and the urban landscape of Cartagena as a whole unit of urbanistic identity.

== See also ==
- List of tallest buildings in Latin America
- List of tallest buildings in Cartagena
- List of tallest buildings in Colombia
