= Jet set (disambiguation) =

A jet set is an international social group of wealthy people.

Jet set or Jetset may also refer to:

== Music ==
=== Artists ===
- The Jet Set, a Polish musical group
- Jet Set Satellite, a Canadian rock band
- The Jetset, a British band (1979–1988)

=== Record labels ===
- Jet Set Records, a French record label
- Jetset Records, a New York-based indie rock record label

=== Songs ===
- "Jet Set" (Alphaville song), released in 1985
- "Jet Set" (Emilia and Nathy Peluso song), released in 2024
- "Jet Set", an instrumental television theme song composed by Mike Vickers, circa 1974
- "The Jet Set", a song from Joe Jackson's album Big World, released in 1986
- "(We're Not) The Jet Set", a song by George Jones and Tammy Wynette, released in 1974
- "Jet Set", a song by Ava Max, released in 2016

== Television ==
- Jet Set (game show), a game show in the United Kingdom, which is also in conjunction with the National Lottery
- "Jet Set", Mad Men (season 2), episode 11
- The Jet Set (TV program), an American travel-themed television series

== Other media ==
- Jet Set (film), a 2000 French film
- Jet Set Radio, a 2000 action video game
- Jet Set Willy, a 1984 platform video game
- Jet-Set (magazine), a Colombian magazine
- JETSET, former name of the podcast Epic Fu
- Jetset Magazine, an American magazine

== Other uses ==
- Jet Set, a nightclub in Santo Domingo, Dominican Republic, site of the Jet Set nightclub roof collapse
- Jet Setting, an Irish Thoroughbred racehorse
- JETSET, the callsign for First Choice Airways
