= Helado =

Helado may refer to:

- Helado, the Spanish word for ice cream
  - Crem Helado, a Colombian ice-cream company, owned by Grupo Nutresa
  - Grido Helado, a chain of ice cream parlours in Argentina
  - Helados EFE, C.A., an ice cream company that is a subsidiary of Empresas Polar
  - Helados La Fresita, an ice cream pop and paleta manufacturer in Medellín, Colombia
- Helado Negro, stage name of American musician Roberto Carlos Lange
