= Hotel Estelar =

Office skyscraper in Cartagena, Colombia

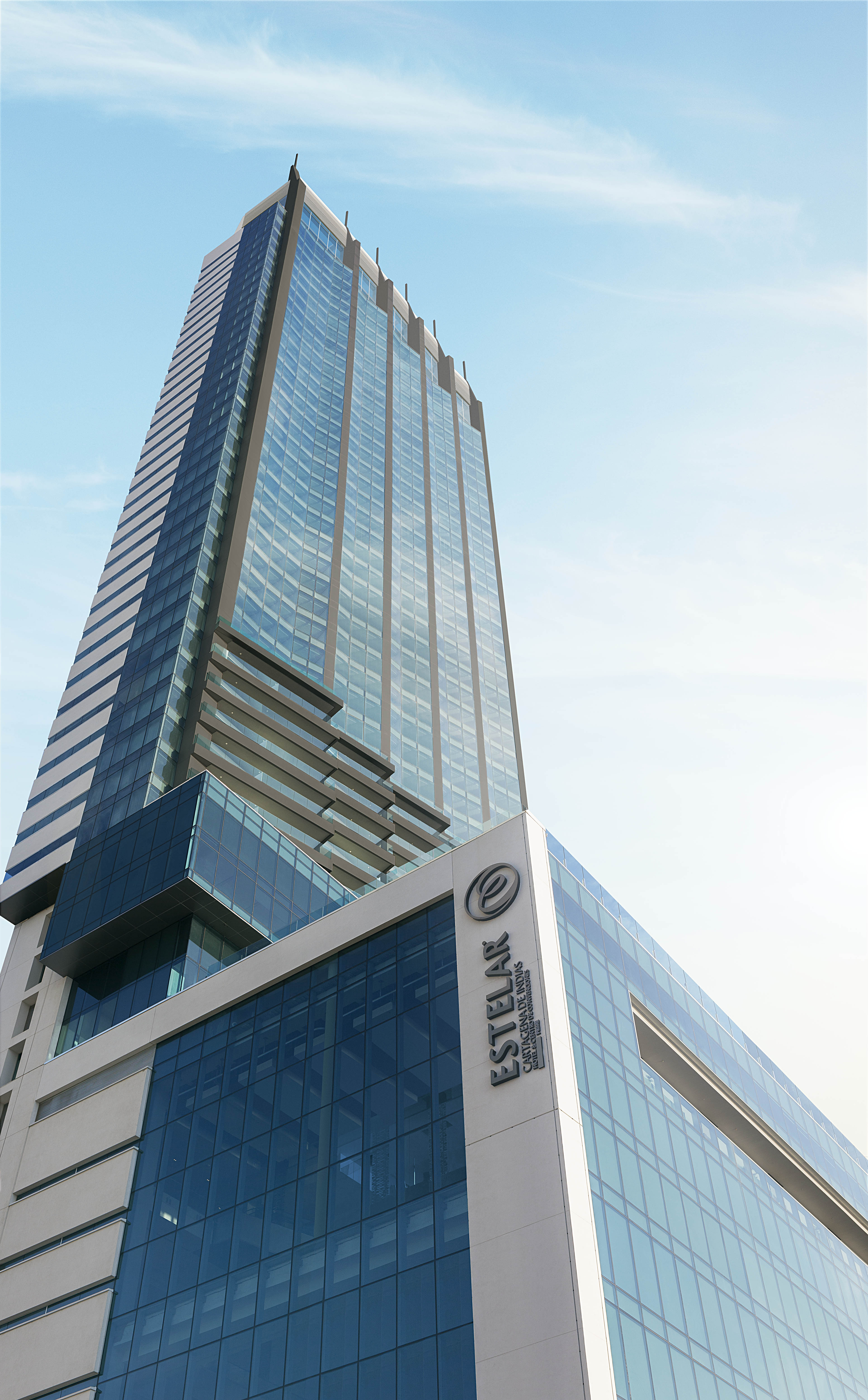
- Interactive map of the Hotel Estelar area

General information
- Status: Completed
- Type: Mixed-use: Residential / Hotel
- Location: Cartagena, Colombia, Cra. 1 #11-116, Bocagrande, Cartagena Province, Bolívar, Colombia
- Coordinates: 10.41003°N 75.55145°W
- Construction started: January 2013
- Completed: July 2016
- Cost: US$47.5 million
- Owner: Grupo Aval

Height
- Roof: 202 m (663 ft)

Technical details
- Structural system: Reinforced concrete
- Floor count: 52
- Floor area: 50,600 m^{2} (545,000 sq ft)

Design and construction
- Structural engineer: TREVIGALANTE S.A., Soilmec (foundation)

Website
- Estelar Hotel

Hotel Estelar (also known as the Hotel Estelar Bocagrande) is a mixed-use skyscraper in the Bocagrande district of Cartagena, Colombia. Built between 2013 and 2016, the tower stands at 202 m (663 ft) tall with 52 floors, and is the current 2nd tallest building in Colombia as well as the tallest in Cartagena.

== History ==
=== Architecture ===
The tower is located in the Bocagrande district of Cartagena. It is divided into two independent parts and houses a total of 338 rentable apartment and hotel suites. The building also houses a convention center capable of hosting 2,000 people. The first part, between floors 1 and 10, the convention and exhibition halls of different sizes and small areas for smaller social events are located. In the second part, which operates from the 11th floor onwards, the hotel suites are housed, while from the 15th floor onwards, a guest reception, a bar and a business center are located. On the 51st floor a viewing platform with a full view of the city is displayed.

== See also ==
- List of tallest buildings in Latin America
- List of tallest buildings in Cartagena
- List of tallest buildings in Colombia
