= Transmetro (Barranquilla) =

- TransMetro bus in May 2025

Overview
- Locale: Barranquilla
- Transit type: Bus rapid transit
- Number of lines: 2
- Number of stations: 18
- Annual ridership: 19.2 million (2025)
- Website: http://transmetro.gov.co/

Operation
- Began operation: April 7, 2010
- Operator: Transmetro S.A.

Technical
- System length: 13.2 km (8.2 mi)
System map

Transmetro, officially, Sistema Integrado de Transporte Masivo de Barranquilla y su Área Metropolitana (Spanish for: Mass Transit Integrated System of Barranquilla and its Metropolitan Area), is the bus rapid transit system that has been operating in Barranquilla, Colombia, since July 10, 2010. It becomes the fifth city in the country to implement and inaugurate this type of transportation system (after Bogotá, Pereira, Cali, and Bucaramanga). It consists of articulated buses that travel on exclusive lanes along the city's main avenues with fixed stops. Its objective is to improve population mobility. It operates from 5:00 a.m. to 10:30 p.m.

On December 22, 2008, the first station of the system was inaugurated, named after sociologist Alfredo Correa de Andréis, located on Carrera 46-Troncal Olaya Herrera and Calle 62.

On April 4, 2010, the first two articulated vehicles and the first six standard vehicles left Pereira, the headquarters of the Busscar assembly plant, for the official inauguration of the system on April 7, 2010, the 197th anniversary of Barranquilla, which was presided over by then-President Álvaro Uribe Vélez.

After a three-month training and testing period, Transmetro began commercial operations on July 10, 2010, with a fare of $1,400 pesos using a rechargeable electronic card system. The system operates with standard and articulated buses that travel along the Murillo and Olaya Herrera trunk roads, in addition to feeder routes.

== History ==
=== Background ===
When President Andrés Pastrana Arango inaugurated Bogotá's Integrated Mass Transit System of the Third Millennium (TransMilenio) in 2000, Barranquilla Mayor Humberto Caiaffa Rivas proposed that the city have a transportation system that would improve the quality of life of Barranquilla residents. Thus, in 2001, Transmetro was born. The relevant studies were completed, and its construction began in 2005. This was a challenge due to Barranquilla's topography. The city is located near the Magdalena River, and whenever it rains, streams form in the streets. The Atlantic Society of Engineers decided not to begin construction of the system until a study for stream channeling was completed. The intention was to integrate some of the roads restored during this period into the system as pre-loading routes.

Construction began in 2005, causing traffic disruptions, especially on Olaya Herrera Avenue, which was the only one closed to channel the Bolívar Stream in the city center. On Murillo Avenue, it caused traffic disruptions on the extension to Soledad, as this artery is the only access to the Metropolitan Transport Terminal.

The contractor's work was progressing slowly until Alejandro Char Chaljub was elected mayor. The project made significant progress, although the paving slabs began to wear prematurely before the system was operational. The administration held the contractor accountable for replacing 600 paving slabs on Murillo Avenue, and the contractors who built the system's first stations (Esthercita Forero and Alfredo Correa de Andréis) were also required to demolish and rebuild them because they failed the endurance test.

On April 7, 2010, Barranquilla's 197th anniversary, the system was inaugurated. However, it began operating with a significant number of vehicles and during peak hours on June 27, 2010, so that people could become familiar with its operation. From July 6 to 10, people could test it all day (from 5:00 AM to 10:00 PM), but the toll gates at the return station and the stations at 21st and La Arenosa during the educational routes were not in operation. On July 11, when commercial operation began, the remaining stations were opened.
