= Miguel Caballero =

Miguel Caballero may refer to:

- Miguel Caballero (company)
- Miguel Caballero Ortega, Spanish ski mountaineer
