= JGB (company) =

Colombian pharmaceutical company

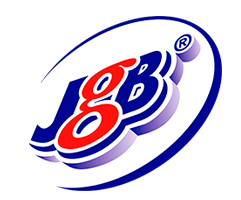
- Founded: 1875
- Founder: Jorge Garcés Borrero
- Type: S.A. (corporation)
- Location: Cali, Colombia
- Origins: Colombia
- Products: pharmaceutical and hygiene products
- Key people: Carlos Polo (CEO)
- Employees: 1.000 (2022)
- Website: www.jgb.com.co

JGB S.A. is a Colombian company that manufactures pharmaceutical products, multivitamin supplements, oral hygiene products and home care products, founded in 1875. It is one of the oldest companies in Colombia.

== History ==
In 1875, the doctor Enrique Garcés Velasco founded the Garcés drugstore, which he ran with his wife Joaquina Borrero de Garcés. In 1899, Dr. Jorge Enrique Garcés died and his son Jorge Garcés Borrero, together with his mother, took over the management of the pharmacy. In 1925, the company formally changed its name to Laboratorios JGB (initials of its name), specialising in the production of pharmaceutical products, especially one of its most marketed products, granulated kola "Tarrito Rojo".

The main plant is in the city of Cali and has two more in Cartagena and Cajicá. Until 2014, it had 1,000 employees. The company exports its products to several distributors located in the Región Andina and the Estados Unidos and maintains operations in Ecuador and Venezuela.

== See also ==
- Health care in Colombia
- List of companies of Colombia
- Tecnoquímicas (Direct competition)
