= List of tallest buildings in Cartagena =

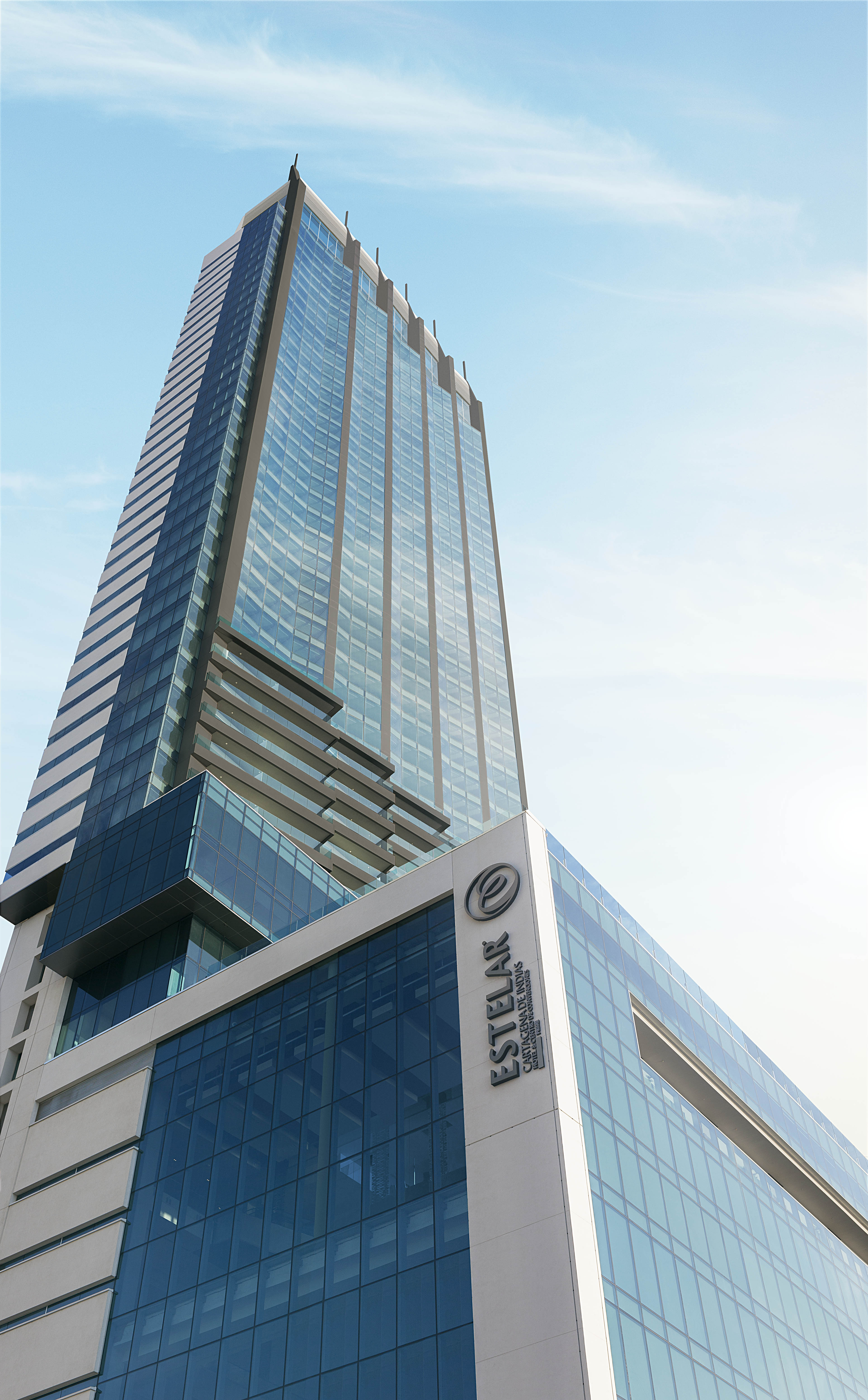
Hotel Estelar Bocagrande, the tallest building in Cartagena

This list ranks skyscrapers in Cartagena, Colombia by height. This lists ranks Cartagena's skyscrapers that stand at least 150 meters (492 feet) tall, based on standard height measurement. This includes spires and architectural details but does not include antenna masts.

The current tallest building in Cartagena is the Hotel Estelar Bocagrande with 202 meters.

Position	Name	Location	Height		Floors	Year of completion
Position	Name	Location	m	ft	Floors	Year of completion
1	Hotel Estelar Bocagrande	Bocagrande	202	663	52	2017
2	Bocagrande Hyatt Regency Cartagena	Bocagrande	190	620	44	2017
3	Allure	Bocagrande	180	590	n.a.	n.a.
4	Grand Bay	Bocagrande	170	560	42	2010
5	Portomarine	Bocagrande	162.5	533	41	2021
6	Nautica	Castillogrande	160	520	n.a.	2019
7	Palmetto Sunset	El Laguito	146	479	42	2017
8	Ravello	Castillogrande	143.83	471.9	38	2017
9	Palmetto	Bocagrande	125	410	39	2008
10	Palmetto Elliptic	Bocagrande	125	410	38	2012
