= Corficolombiana =

Colombian company

Corporación Financiera Colombiana S.A.

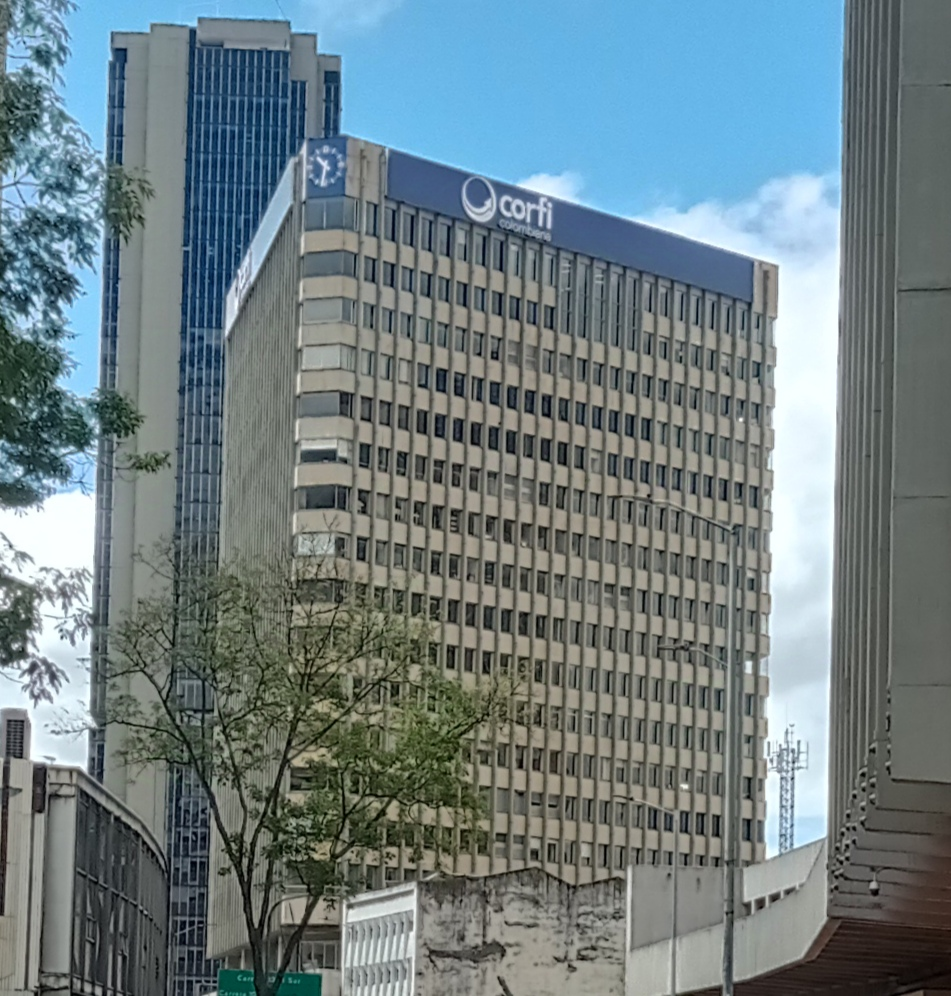
- Company type: Sociedad Anónima
- Traded as: BVC: CORFICOLCF; BVC: PFCORFICOL
- Industry: Financial services
- Founded: 1959
- Headquarters: Bogotá, Colombia
- Key people: Bernardo Noreña Ocampo, (CEO)
- Revenue: ▼US$330.0 million (2012)
- Net income: ▼US$ 66.2 Million (2012)
- Number of employees: 274
- Parent: Banco de Bogotá
- Website: www.corficolombiana.com.co

Corficolombiana Building Headquarters in Bogotá

Corficolombiana is a Colombian company dealing in financial products, with its customers being some of the largest corporations in Colombia.

== History of Corficolombiana ==
Headquartered in Bogotá, Corficolombiana was the first Colombian financial institution. Founded in 1959, it has continued to grow and now offers a wide range of financial services. It has nine offices in Bogotá, and five regional offices located in Cali, Medellín, Bucaramanga, Barranquilla and Santa Fe de Bogotá.

Corficolombiana offers three specialized services: credit, investments and financial intermediation, offering its clients a consultant's office, financing, investment, security and yield optimization.

In 1999, Corficolombiana merged with three other financial corporations, La Corporación Financiera de los Andes (Financial Corporation of the Andes), La Corporación Financiera Santander (Santander Financial Corporation) and Indufinanciera. The purpose of the merger was to pool resources and to create an efficient financial infrastructure.

Between 1999 and 2000, Corficolombiana received capitalization of more than 130 billion pesos, allowing the company to continue in its financial endeavours.

Corficolombiana S.A. belongs to Grupo Aval, one of the largest economic organizations in Colombia, with investments in diverse sectors of the economy.

By late 2005 Corficolombiana S.A. initiated a merger with La Corporacion Financiera del Valle (Corfivalle).

== History of Corfivalle ==
Corfivalle (La Corporación Financiera del Valle) began on April 27, 1961, when more than one hundred investors met at the Cali Chamber of Commerce and signed Articles of Incorporation. The articles were approved October 2, 1961, by the Office of Banking Supervision. On November 27, the Articles of Incorporation were released to the public and the corporation opened to business that same day, having a supervisor and nine employees on the payroll, with offices in Cali and Bogotá. Also in 1961, Corfivalle opened its International Department, and received its first Letter of Credit from a foreign bank in order to finance the purchase of new equipment.

In 1980, the Colombian government released its control on interest rates, leading to a significant business boom. 1981, Corfivalle looked to create within the financial system a new type of financial interest involved in the robust capital market, as well as the acquisition of resources necessary to assure the development of the most productive sectors of the economy.

By 1982, Corfivalle specialized in offering credits for the repayment of a contract at a discount and in promoting projects financed within the guidelines of the World Bank.

In 1984, Corfivalle opened an office in Medellín, and a second office in Bogotá.

In 1985, the International Finance Corporation extended credit, underwritten by the United States, of $6 million to Corfivalle, having a term of 8 years with a 5-year grace period.

In 1992, the Apex Holding Company was created to for participation in the stock market. This company included the IFC of the World Bank, and the Mexican Stock Market, each with 20% of the shares, while Corfivalle maintained 60%.

In 1994, Cofivalle Finance Bahamas Limited was established. This allowed Corfaville to expand its business and to remain one of Colombia's key financial institutions.

In 2005 Corfivalle purchased Corficolombiana, but was not the nominal successor. Since 2006, Corfivalle is a trademark of Corficolombiana S.A.

== Gallery ==
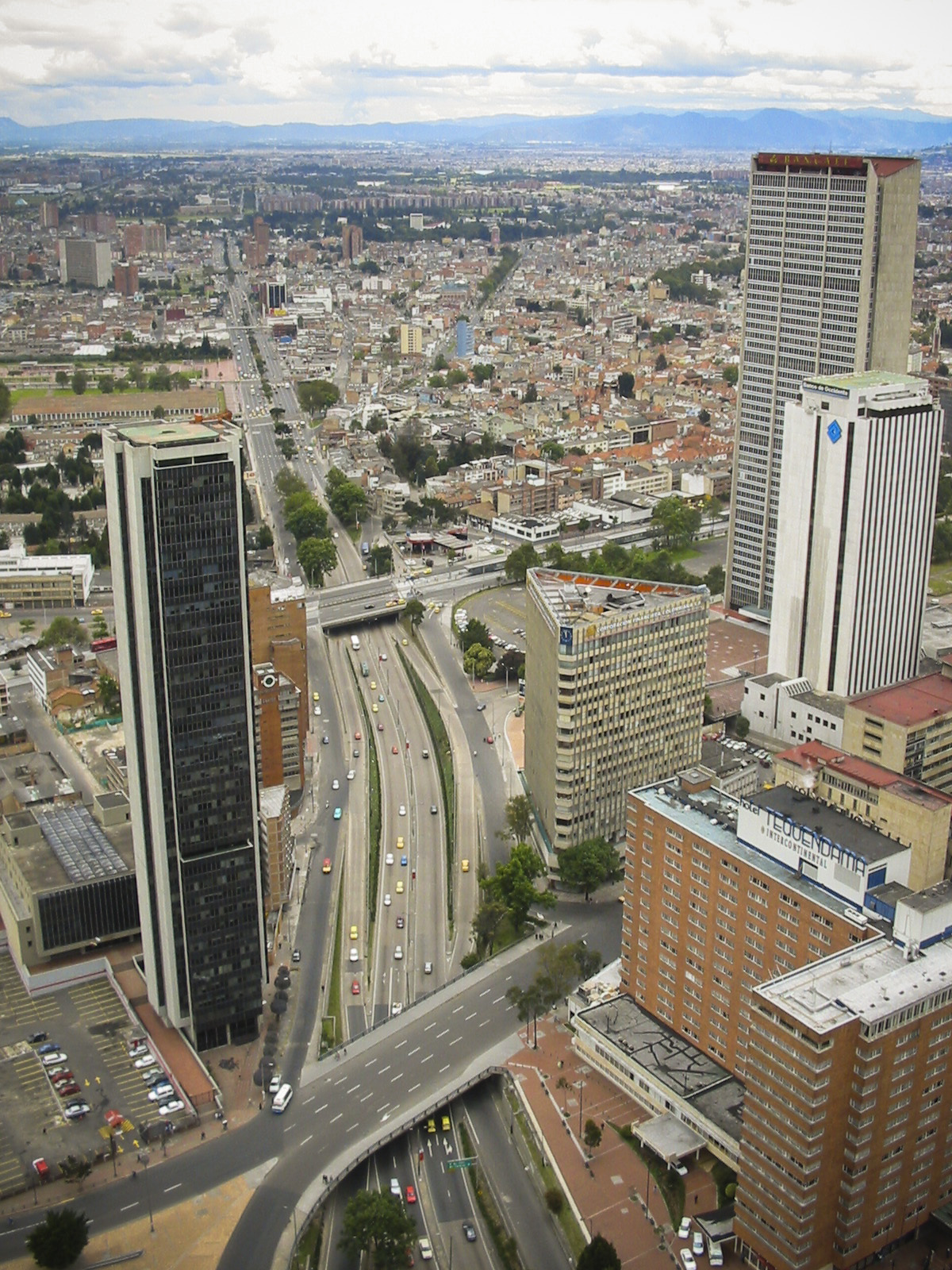
Corficolombiana building in Bogotá downtown

Current Corficolombiana headquarters building
