= Tecnoquímicas =

- Founded: December 17, 1934
- Founder: Francisco Barberi Zamorano
- Type: S.A. (corporation)
- Location: Cali, Colombia
- Origins: Colombia
- Products: pharmaceutical and hygiene products
- Key people: Francisco José Barberi (CEO)
- Revenue: USD 646 millions (2022)
- Employees: 8.600 (2022)
- Website: www.tqconfiable.com

Tecnoquímicas It is a Colombian company that manufactures pharmaceutical products, multivitamin supplements, hygiene products and home care products, founded in 1934. Its operating headquarters of are located in Cali, Colombia.

In 2023, itrepresented 14% of the Colombian pharmaceutical market.

== History ==
Tecnoquímicas was founded in Colombia by Francisco Barberi in 1934. Initially, they were called "Colombia Sales Company" and after a merger process with Laboratorios Fixalia the name was changed to "Tecnoquímicas" in 1957.

It has two industrial plants, one in Cali for pharmaceutical products and one in Villa Rica, where diapers are manufactured.

== Portfolio ==
- Bonfiest Plus
- Bonfiest Lua
- Colbón
- Content
- Crema No. 4
- Cureband
- Gastrofast
- IbuFlash
- Medicamentos MK
- Noraver
- Sal de Frutas Lua
- Vita C MK
- Kola Granulada MK
- Z-full MK
- Vitafull
- Winny
- Yodora
- Altex
- MK Niños
- Durafex {ya no existe}
- Duraflex (antes Durafex)

== See also ==
- Health care in Colombia
- List of companies of Colombia
- JGB (Direct competition)
