= Luis Carlos Sarmiento =

Colombian billionaire

Luis Carlos Sarmiento Angulo
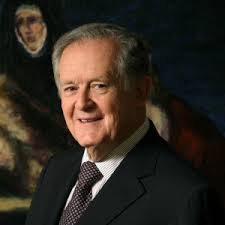
- Born: 27 January 1933 (age 93); Bogotá, Colombia
- Education: National University of Colombia
- Known for: Majority shareholder and chairman, Grupo Aval
- Spouse: Fanny Gutiérrez de las Casas (m.1955)
- Children: 5
- Awards: Order of Boyacá; 2004 Grand Cross; Order of the Congress of the Republic (Colombia); 2004 Grand Officer

Luis Carlos Sarmiento Angulo (born 27 January 1933) is a Colombian billionaire businessman and banker. His fortune derives primarily from the banking conglomerate Grupo Aval, of which he is the majority shareholder and chairman. For many years, he has been the wealthiest person in Colombia, according to Forbes and Bloomberg. As of December 2025, Forbes estimated his net worth at US$9.8 billion.

== Career ==
Sarmiento founded Grupo Aval as a holding company to gather his banking, telecommunications, and real estate interests. Four major banks, as well as other financial service corporations, form the core of the organization. In 2000, plans to list Grupo Aval on the New York Stock Exchange were postponed due to Wall Street's unfavorable climate for emerging market funds.

== Personal life ==
His younger brother is Roman Catholic bishop Enrique Sarmiento (born 1934).

== See also ==
- Julio Mario Santo Domingo Pumarejo
- Germán Efromovich
