= La Polar =

Retail company in Chile

Empresas La Polar S.A.
- Type: Sociedad Anónima
- Traded as: BCS:LA POLAR
- Industry: Department store
- Founded: 1920
- Headquarters: Santiago, Chile
- Key people: Jorge Andres Ibañez, (Chairman)
- Products: Clothing, Accessories, Electronics, Furniture
- Revenue: ▼US$ 795.9 million (2012)
- Net income: ▲US$ 390.8 million (2012)
- Number of employees: 6,000
- Website: www.lapolar.cl

La Polar was retail company in Chile.

The company has 43 stores, being 38 in Chile and 5 in Colombia and offers various products, such as clothing, accessories, sporting goods, beauty products, gifts, infant products, electronics, furniture, furnishings, and household products. It also provides a range of services comprising the credit cards, general and life insurance, and extended warranty durable products.

== Renegotiated customers' debt without consent ==
On 17 June 2011 Chile's Superintendencia de Valores y Seguros (securities regulator) indefinitely suspended trading in Empresas La Polar SA pending an investigation after La Polar announced it would have to provision an additional $430 million due to irregularities in its store-credit department.
