= Loggro =

Loggro S.A.S.
- Industry: Information Technology
- Founded: 2020
- Founder: Alejandro Vasquez Aramburo
- Headquarters: Medellín, Colombia
- Number of locations: 1 development centers (2021)
- Area served: Latin America
- Products: Enterprise resource planning, Human Resource Information Systems
- Revenue: US$10 million (2024)
- Number of employees: 208 (2024)
- Website: http://loggro.com
- Footnotes / references Spin-off from Productora de Software in 2020

Loggro S.A.S. is a Colombian cloud-based enterprise software platform for small and medium-sized enterprises (SMEs). Loggro also offers specialized software such as Point of Sales, restaurant management systems, payment processing, and hotel/accommodation management (PMS).

== History ==
Loggro originated as a project within PSL (Productora de Software S.A.S.), a Colombian software company founded in 1984 by Jorge Aramburo Siegert. Following PSL's acquisition by Perficient Inc. in 2020, Loggro continued to operate independently in the Colombian market.

In 2022, Loggro acquired PirPos, a startup focused on point-of-sale (POS) software for restaurants.

In 2023, Loggro was named by Forbes as one of the 100 best startups in Colombia and ranked among the top 5 fintech companies.

Currently Loggro is an authorized technology provider recognized by the Colombian National Directorate of Taxes and Customs, DIAN, for generating electronic invoicing in compliance with regulatory standards.
