= Organizacion Corona =

- Company type: Private
- Industry: Building material and Retail
- Founded: 1881
- Founder: Echavarria Family
- Headquarters: Bogota, Colombia
- Area served: Colombia; United States; Panama; Mexico
- Number of employees: 12,500
- Subsidiaries: Hipercentro Corona, Manfield Plumbing, American Standard Brands, Homecenter, Orchid Ceramics, Grival, Colceramica, Vajillas Corona, Insumos Industriales
- Website: www.corona.co

Organizacion Corona (known as Corona in Colombia) was founded in 1881 by a group of investors including Victoriano Restrepo Uribe, making it one of the oldest business entities in Colombia. In 1935 it was purchased by Gabriel Echavarría Misas. It is one of the largest conglomerates in South American country.

It has operations in Colombia, Panama, Mexico, the United States and China, and exports to more than 20 countries.

The leader of the family for many years was Hernán Echavarría Olózoga, and it is still owned by the Echavarría family.
