= Transcaribe =

Integrated Mass Transit System Transcaribe - Cartagena de Indias
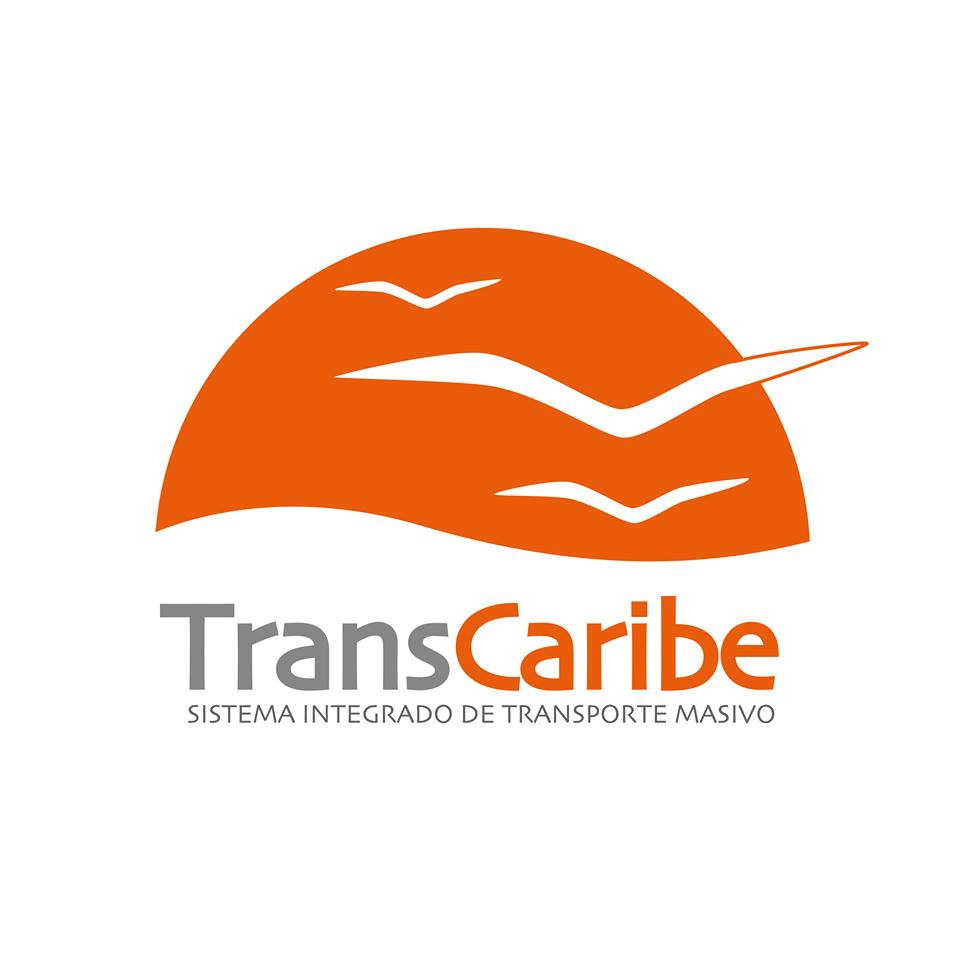

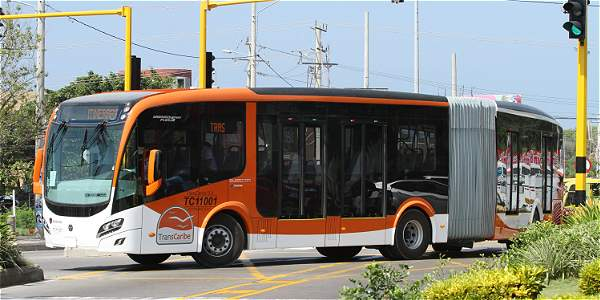

Overview
- Locale: Cartagena, Colombia
- Transit type: Bus rapid transit
- Number of lines: 5
- Number of stations: 16
- Daily ridership: 150,000 by August 2024.
- Annual ridership: 28.6 million (2025)
- Website: Transcaribe

Operation
- Began operation: November 17, 2015
- Operator: TransCaribe SA

Technical
- System length: 10.5 km (6.5 mi)

Transcaribe is a bus rapid transit (BRT) system which operates in the city of Cartagena, Colombia, and was inaugurated in March 2016. It consists of 16 stations, and centers around a dedicated 10.5 kilometres (6.5 mi) bus lane along Avenida Pedro de Heredia from the El Portal terminal to the city's old town. For the first two months after it opened, (November and December 2015), the system was free to encourage ridership. Transcaribe's 150-passenger articulated buses are powered by compressed natural gas. Unlike Colombia's older BRT systems in Bogotá (Transmileno) and Pereira, Transcaribe was designed to offer hybrid service (pretroncal) on bus lanes and city streets; this eliminated the need to change buses on routes to Crespo, Bocagrande, and Cartagena's southeastern suburbs.
