= Bocagrande =

- Neighborhood
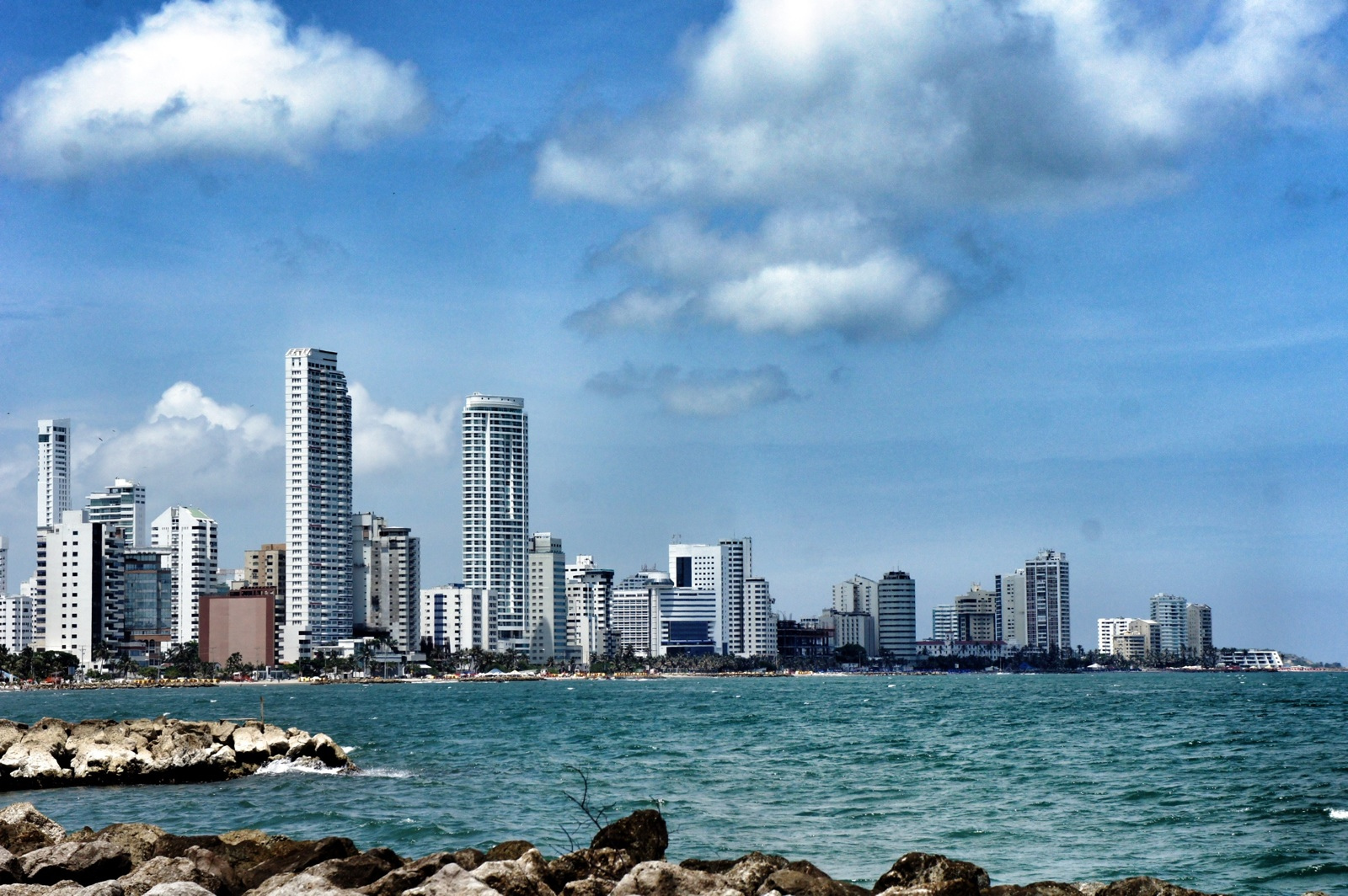
- Bocagrande Harbour

- Seal

- Location within Colombia
- Coordinates: 10°24′18″N 75°33′12″W
- Country: Colombia
- Region: Caribbean
- Department: Bolívar
- City: Cartagena de Indias
- Barrio: Bocagrande

Government
  - Mayor: Manuel Vicente Duque
- Demonym: Bocareño(s) (in Spanish)
- Time zone: UTC-5 (Colombia Time (COT))

Bocagrande is a neighborhood in the city of Cartagena de Indias in Bolívar, Colombia. It was designed with first-world standards, such as residential areas of restricted access, and a separate plant for processing waste water. It is located atop a peninsula immediately south of the historic walled city. The neighborhood gets its name from the large water channel mouth located between El Laguito and the Tierra Bomba island to the south.

== Economy and culture ==
Bocagrande is known in Cartagena for having some of the most important hotels of the city. It is one of the most expensive neighborhoods in the country and is the most expensive and exclusive in the entire zone.

It is a wealthy neighborhood of the city, between the Avenida Santander and the Carrera 6.

=== Points of interest ===
The neighborhood is near the Ciudad Amurallada, the most popular tourist attraction in the city, which has an old town and a lot of museums and theaters.

The neighborhood includes popular hotels, supermarkets, and cafes.

== Geography ==
The Bocagrande neighborhood is divided into zones, most of which are expensive and exclusive:

- Plaza Bocagrande: the first zone of the neighborhood. It connects the city center to Bocagrande. It has one of the most expensive malls in the country, Plaza Bocagrande, only second to Centro Andino in Bogotá. It has several monuments, landmarks, and prominent hotel brands such as Hampton, Holiday Inn, and Decameron. Also notable is the Estelar Hotel, which has a 202 m (663 ft) tower, the tallest of the country. The zone has the Naval Hospital of Cartagena, Hospital Santa Cruz de Bocagrande, the Medihelp Clinic, Medical Laboratories, a large quantity of private medical practices. It is also home to the most populous beaches of the area, as well as restaurants, supermarkets and international chains like McDonald's, Starbucks, Crepes & Waffles, Subway, Carulla, Olímpica, and El Corral Hamburgers. This is the financial zone of the neighborhood, home to banks like Bancolombia and Davivienda. In this zone you can find unofficial shops that sell brands such as Louis Vuitton, Bvlgari, Oscar de la Renta, Prada, Versace, Dolce & Gabbana, and Burberry. It is the second most exclusive zone of the whole country, just behind the Pink Zone of Bogotá, which have official boutiques of many brands.

The Rooftop of Bocagrande Plaza mall functions as a stage for events, receiving some artists such as Passenger (Runaway Tour), Riva (Hearts & Diamonds Tour), Years & Years (Palo Santo Tour), Jorge Celedón, Silvestre Dangond, and Alci Acosta

- Castillogrande or Big Castle: the second zone of the Bocagrande and the most expensive of all. Most of the buildings are residential. On the south of the zone is located the naval club of Cartagena, and on the north is the New Hospital of Bocagrande, one of the most important hospitals of the neighborhood. In Castillogrande you can also find the Dominican Republic embassy.
- South Bocagrande or Sucre Bocagrande: the commercial zone of Bocagrande. It has supermarkets, restaurants, the second mall of the neighborhood, the Nao Mall. In this zone one can find one of the oldest hotels of the neighborhood, the Caribe Hotel, which is where Barack Obama security staff stayed. The church of the zone is Nuestra señora del perpetuo socorro.
- El Lagüito or The little Lake: the last zone of the neighborhood, and the most touristic. It has parks, and several hotels such as the Hilton Hotel, Dann Hotel and Hotel Estelar Oceania. It is the smallest zone of the neighborhood, and mainly houses buildings used for short term and vacation rentals. It is known for the lake found in the middle of it, for which it gets its name.

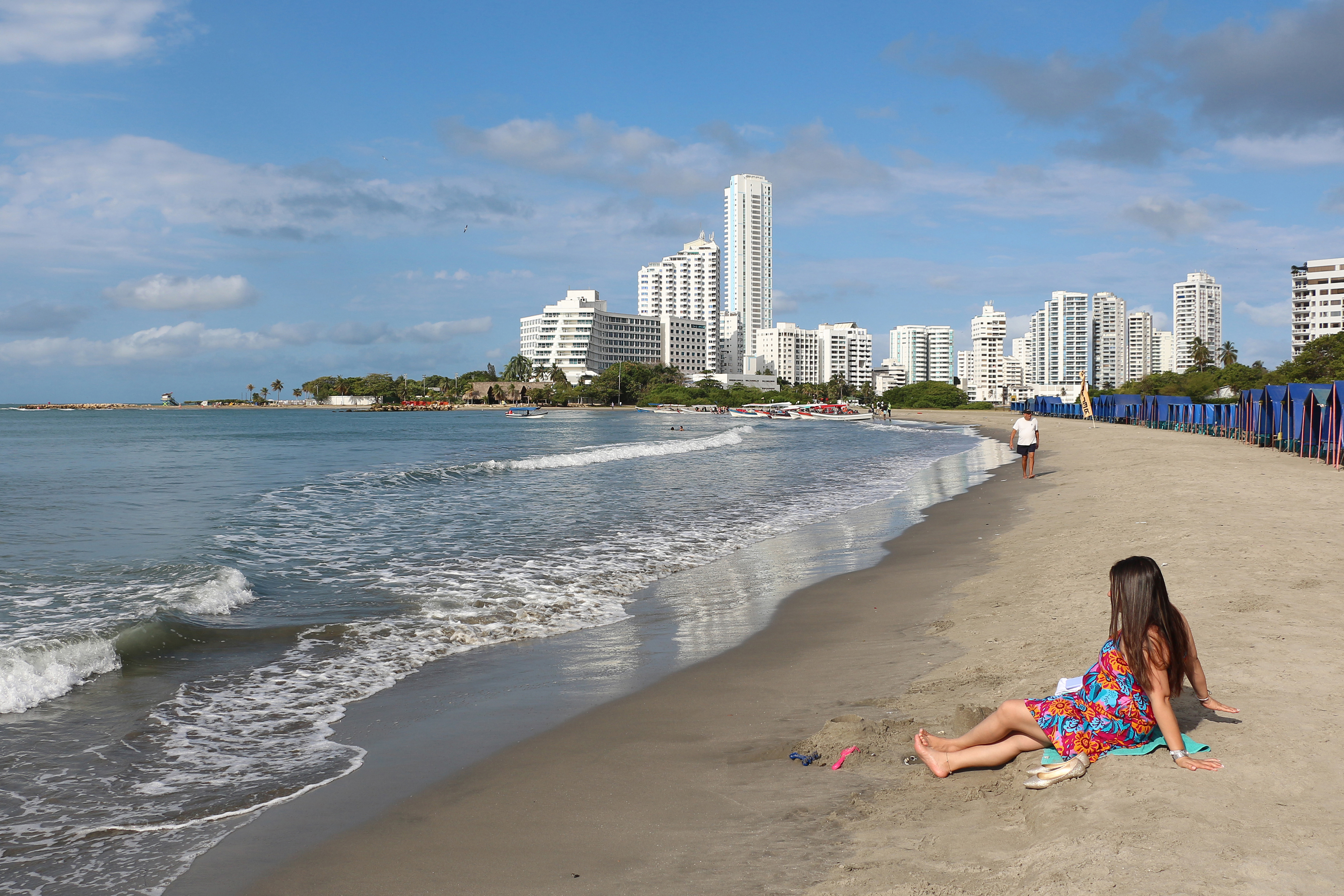
Beach of Bocagrande

== Transportation ==
Bocagrande has no public transportation, but it is near a Transcaribe station.

The neighbourhood has the Bocagrande Station, one of the most important systems of the city, the Transcaribe.

== Health ==
Bocagrande is home to hospital and clinics of the city.

- Nuevo Hospital de Bocagrande is the biggest hospital in Bocagrande and the most important. It is located in the zone of Castillogrande.
- Medihelp Clinic is located in the zone of Castillogrande, near the Nuevo Hospital de Bocagrande.
- Sonria and Coodontologos are the biggest dental clinics in town, and are located in South Bocagrande.
- Naval Hospital of Cartagena is one of the biggest hospitals in the city. It is located in the entrance of the neighborhood, between the city center and Plaza Bocagrande.
- Premium Care Clinic is a medical center for plastic surgery. It is located in the zone of El Lagüito.

== Notable people born in Bocagrande ==
- Orlando Cabrera
- Emiliano Fruto
- Sugar Ray Marimón
- Manuel Medrano
- Erick Morillo
- Giovanny Urshela
