= Busscar de Colombia =

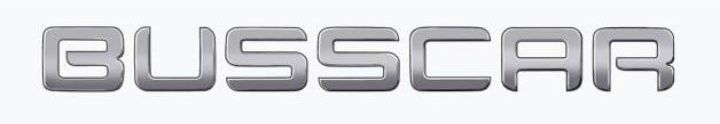

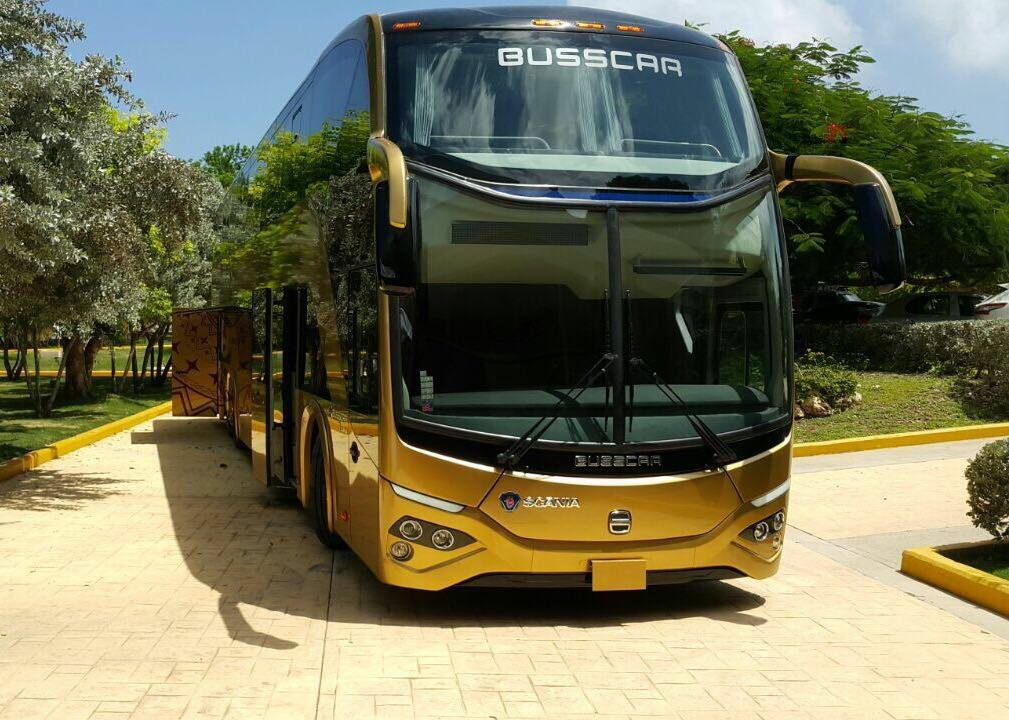
- The new BusStar DD S1, Busscar Colombia
- Founded: 2003
- Type: S.A. (corporation)
- Location: Pereira, Colombia
- Origins: Colombia
- Products: Bus manufacturer
- Key people: Angélica Gálvez (General Manager)
- Parent organization: Busscar
- Website: www.busscar.com.co

Busscar de Colombia it is a Colombian business enterprise making buses, whose main headquarters of operations is in the city of Pereira, in Risaralda, and which was a subsidiary of the parent company based in the city of Joinville, State of Santa Catarina, Brazil.

== History ==
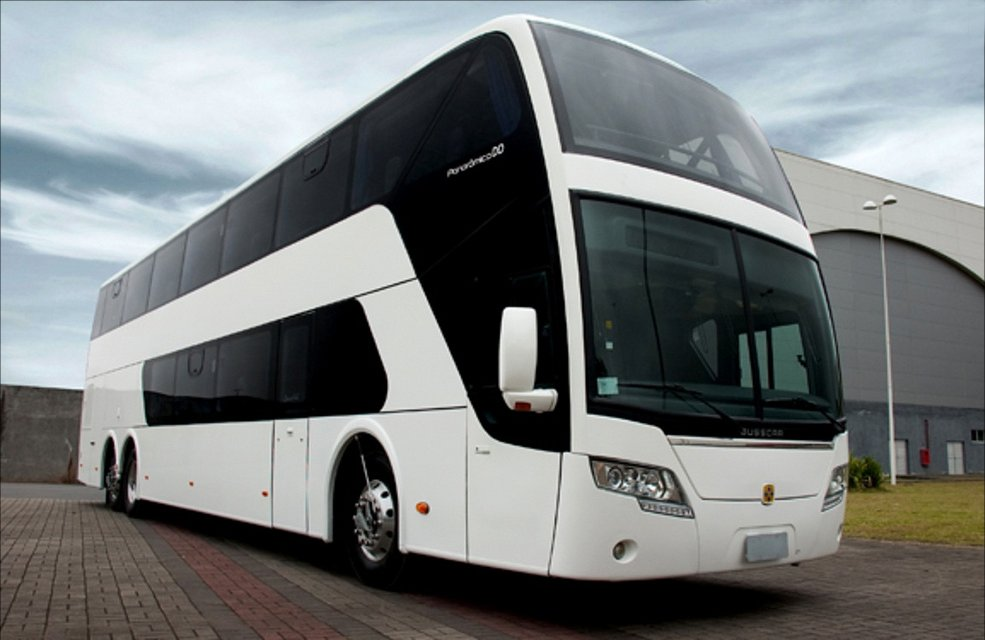
Panoramic DD S1, Busscar

The company was founded in Colombia after acquiring a certain percentage of shares in the local coachbuilder Carrocerías de Occidente, which had already been in the industrial sector for more than ten years, providing chassis for passenger transport. Following the decision of the Brazilian bodybuilder, it was decided to assist a local producer, with a view to establishing itself in the local bus and truck market. Bus rapid transit, a growing sector in the face of the implementation of rapid transit bus systems such as TransMilenio, Megabús, Transcaribe, Transmetro, among others, in which the Brazilian house already had experience and technology to compete against the rival, also Brazilian. Marcopolo S.A. Initially a joint venture, the Brazilian firm purchased shares in the Colombian firm and was later re-founded in 2004. Its parent company is owned by Colombian investors and the Brazilian Nielson family.

In the Brazilian market, the firm Busscar Onibus ceased to exist after it declared bankruptcy on September 27, 2012, But even after this act, Busscar's hopes have not yet ended, since the Busscar subsidiary in Colombia has shown itself to be a solid company, currently at its peak in terms of production, and has continued with the development of the latter in the manufacture of buses and coaches, both for the Colombian market and for export, with its products already being seen in Central American countries.

In Colombia, the firm almost disappeared as a result of two accidents in which successive fires consumed up to 40% of its facilities, After which it decided to re-found and reinvent itself by redesigning its range of articulated vehicles in operation and increasing its staff, with a view to rebuilding quickly, which happened.

Today, it is one of the main coachbuilders in Latin America, and has exported its products to Mexico, Chile, Panama, Peru, Bolivia, Ecuador and Suriname, consolidating its position in the international bus market.
