= Jet Set Satellite =

Canadian rock band

- Origin: Winnipeg, Manitoba, Canada
- Genre: Rock
- Years active: 1998–present
- Labels: Nettwerk; Self-released
- Members: Trevor Tuminski; Dave Swiecicki
- Website: www.facebook.com/Jet-Set-Satellite

Jet Set Satellite is a Canadian rock band based in Winnipeg, Manitoba.

== History ==
Jet Set Satellite was founded in 1998 by singer/guitarist Trevor Tuminski and multi-instrumentalist/producer Dave Swiecicki. The pair released their debut album Blueprint in March 2000, via Nettwerk Records.

Touring with three hired musicians, the duo celebrated two Top 20 Canadian hit singles, "Best Way to Die" and "Baby, Cool Your Jets", at rock radio, and tie-in videos that received regular rotation on MuchMusic and MTV Europe that year. Guitarist Mike Keller would soon become a member and, in 2001, bass player Tery Kazakoff and drummer Rich Reid were added to the group's lineup.

In 2003, Tuminski and Swiecicki exercised an escape clause in their contract with Nettwerk so that the five band members could work on a second album with more creative freedom. During this time, Jet Set Satellite's music appeared in various media, including feature films American Outlaws and Soul Survivors, and video game EA Sports' NHL 2002.

By mid-2004, the band would also part ways with Kazakoff, before releasing an independent follow-up to Blueprint, entitled Vegas, on October 25, 2005, and distributed by Fusion 3. The title track (for which there is also a music video), "Together," "Remover", and "Please Capture Me" were released as radio singles. The band toured independently throughout 2005 and 2006 to promote Vegas, adding bass player Jay Rink to the fold by the end of the album's promotional campaign. "Together" was featured in the season finale of television's ER and an episode of television's Tru Calling, "Belonging" was synchronized in a made-for-television movie titled Grizzly Rage, and "Among the Living" was featured in a television show called Johnny Zero.

In August 2008, Jet Set Satellite released its third album, End of an Era, distributed by Storming The Base. The songs "Ladykiller" and "Black.Heart.Burn" were released as singles (including a video for the former) and would be the extent of the album's promotion as the band went on hiatus by late 2008.

In 2013, after more than four years of silence, members of Jet Set Satellite released a rewrite of its hit single "Baby, Cool Your Jets," in honour of the return of the NHL to Winnipeg, called "Baby, Fuel Your Jets."

In late 2014, the band issued a digital-only, limited-time-only release of rarities and previously unreleased material called Ashes From the Fire.

The songs "Ladykiller" and "Black.Heart.Burn" appeared in numerous episodes of Guillermo del Toro's FX television series The Strain as the sound of the character of Bolivar's band.

== Band members ==
- Trevor Tuminski - vocals, guitar (1998–present)
- Dave "Bulldog" Swiecicki - keyboards, guitar, percussion, production (1998–present)
- Mike Keller - lead guitar (2000–present)
- Rich Reid - drums (2001–present)
- Jay Rink - bass guitar (2006–present)
- Tery Kazakoff - bass guitar (2001–2004)

== Discography ==
- Blueprint - 2000, Nettwerk Records
1. Lies by the Thousands
2. Best Way to Die
3. The Night it Went Too Far
4. Blueprint
5. The Goodbye Letter
6. Baby, Cool Your Jets
7. After the Rain
8. Tinfoil Star
9. Afterglow
10. Suddenly
- Vegas - 2005, Independent
1. The Slow Descent
2. Holding On and Never Letting Go
3. Vegas
4. We're Above This
5. Together
6. Belonging
7. Remover
8. Among the Living
9. Please Capture Me
10. Walk Away
11. Invisible Words
12. I'm What You Need
- End Of An Era - 2008, Independent
1. The Beast
2. Ladykiller
3. Black.Heart.Burn
4. Resurrexit
5. You and I
6. XOXO (You Can't Go)
7. If Not Now Never
8. This Is Not a Come On
9. By the Dark of Night
10. Children of the Grave
11. The Mark
