= Banco de Occidente Credencial =

Banco de Occidente S.A.

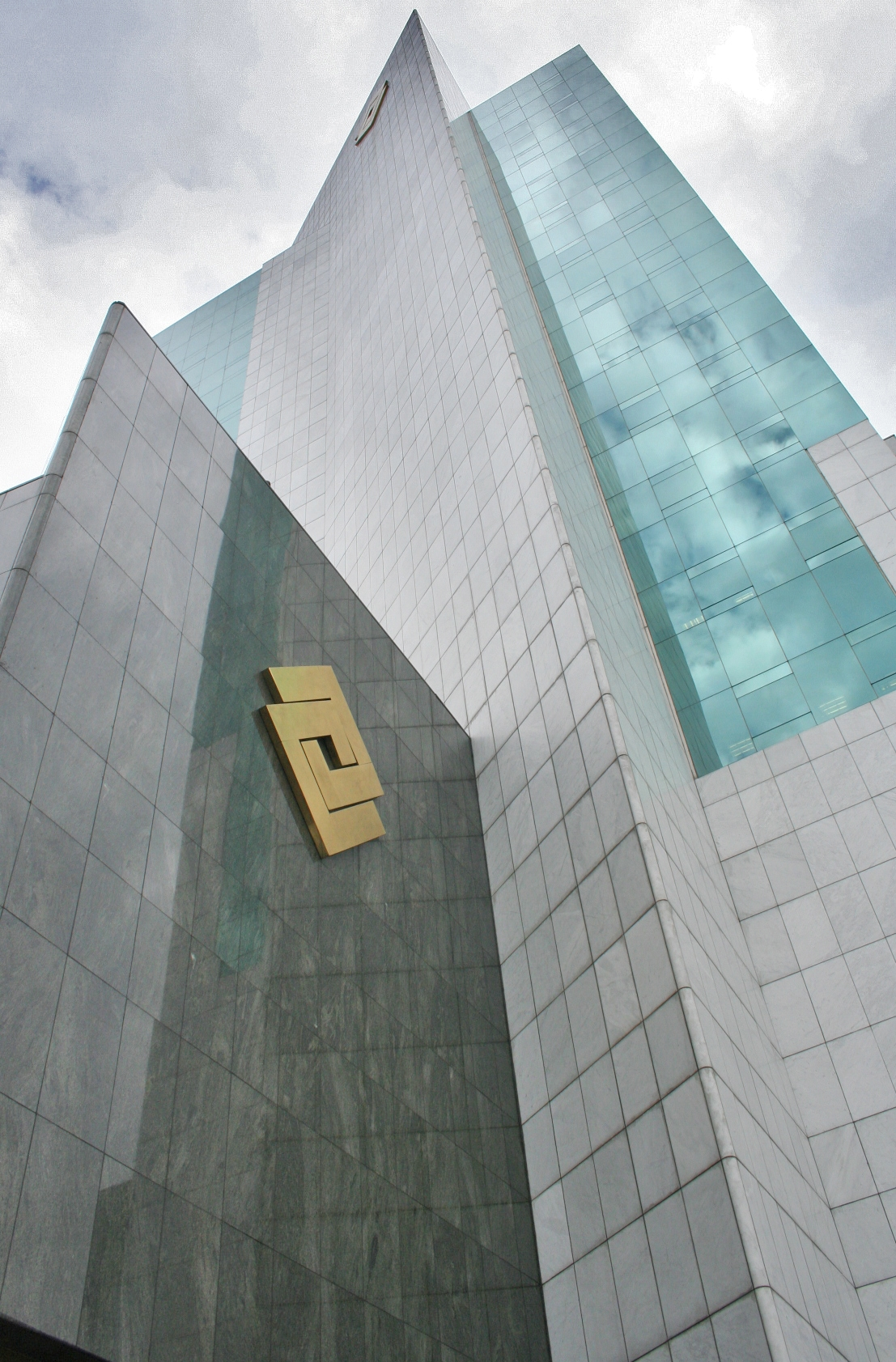
- Headquarters in Cali.
- Company type: Sociedad Anónima
- Traded as: BVC: OCCIDENTE
- ISIN: COT14PA00041
- Industry: Financial services
- Founded: 1965
- Headquarters: Cali, Colombia
- Key people: Gerardo Silva Castro (Chairman)
- Products: Banking
- Revenue: ▲US$ 957.7 million (2012)
- Net income: ▲US$ 293.9 million (2012)
- Total assets: ▲US$ 14 852 million (2023)
- Number of employees: 6,828
- Parent: Grupo Aval
- Website: www.bancooccidente.com.co

Banco de Occidente is one of the largest Colombian banks. It is part of the Grupo Aval conglomerate of financial services in Colombia, owned by the country tycoon of finances, Luis Carlos Sarmiento Angulo (Ranked 285 on the 2009 forbes list of world billionaires).

== History ==
Banco de Occidente began operations as a commercial banking corporation, duly incorporated, on May 3, 1965, under the administration of the first manager, Mr. Alfonso Díaz. Its orientation and scope initially maintained a regional tone during the first years, a period during which the development of the banking sector was really slow.

The first offices outside Cali were opened in Palmira, Pereira and Armenia. In 1970, the Bank had a network of 15 offices, a net worth of approximately 74 million pesos and total assets of around 685 million.
