= Hamburguesas El Corral =

Colombian restaurant chain

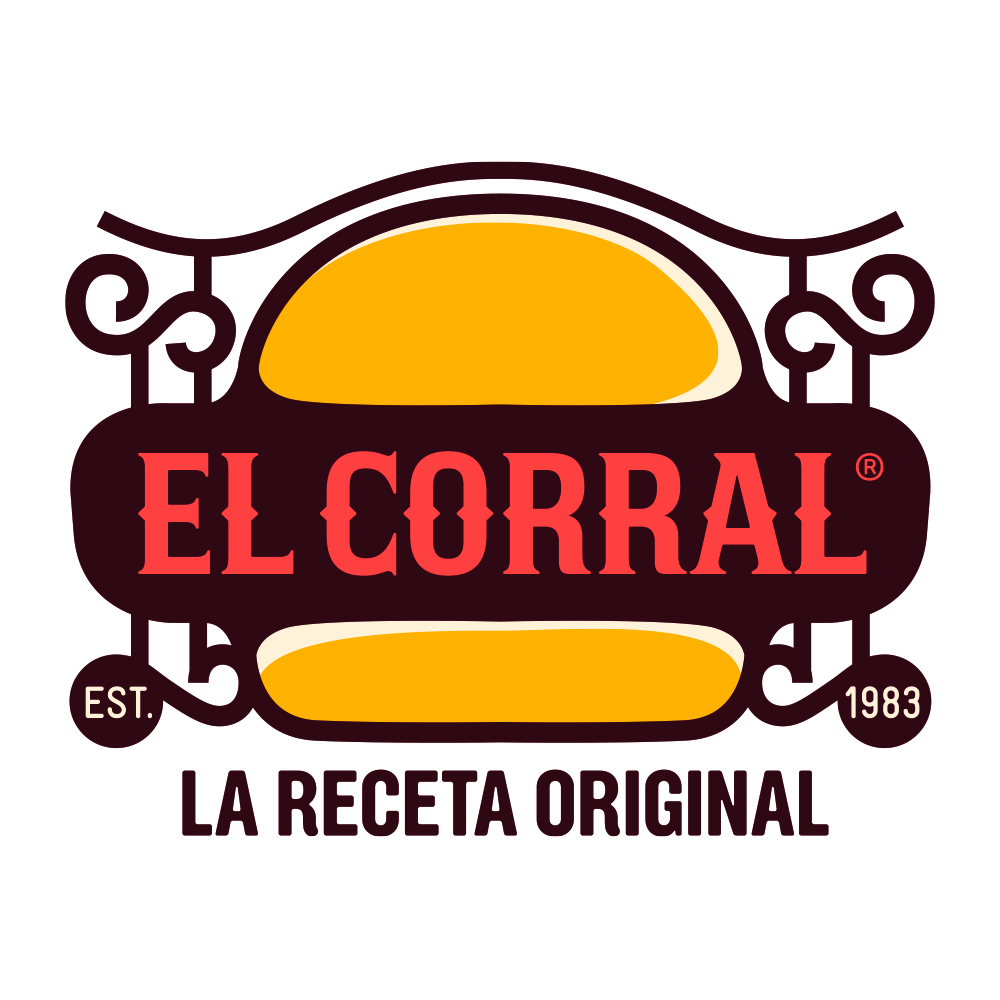
- Company type: Wholly owned subsidiary
- Industry: Fast casual restaurants
- Founded: 1983; 43 years ago in Bogotá, Colombia
- Headquarters: Colombia
- Products: Fast food, Milkshakes
- Parent: Grupo Nutresa
- Website: www.elcorral.com

Hamburguesas El Corral is a Colombian restaurant chain with more than 208 locations. El Corral operates in several formats: Free Stand, Food Court, HiperMarkets and Convenience Store.

It is estimated that the Colombian chain is first in the fast food sector in Colombia, with 40% of the market share.

== History ==
The first restaurant was opened in 1983 near Pontificia Universidad Javeriana by Pablo Emilio Bueno and Guillermo Calderón. In 2001, El Corral opened its first Corral Gourmet restaurant, offering not only hamburgers with different gourmet toppings such as aged cheeses, Argentinian sausage, stir-fry vegetables and different bread options and a range of liquors in its bar.

In 2014, Grupo Nutresa bought El Corral and Beer Station from previous owners Grupo Va!.

== Global locations ==
El Corral has 210 restaurants in 30 Colombian cities. In 2006, El Corral started its international operations opening the first restaurant outside Colombia in Panama. In 2013, El Corral opened its first restaurant in the United States located in Doral, Miami, Florida. El Corral has more than 15 restaurants in Latin America.

- Colombia: 210 restaurants.
- Chile: 3 restaurants.
- Panama: 3 restaurants.
- Ecuador: 3 restaurants.

– Source.

== See also ==
- Nation's Giant Hamburgers
- List of hamburger restaurants
