= Miguel Caballero (company) =

Colombian fashion designer

Miguel Caballero S.A.S.
- Type: Private
- Industry: Clothing industry; Textile industry
- Founded: 1992; 34 years ago
- Founder: Miguel Caballero
- Headquarters: Bogotá, Colombia
- Products: Body armor
- Website: miguelcaballero.com

Miguel Caballero S.A.S. is an international protective clothing company based in Bogotá, Colombia, operating branches in Mexico and Guatemala. The company specialises in fashionable armored clothing. Notable clients include King Felipe VI of Spain, Michael Bloomberg, former Colombian president Álvaro Uribe, former Venezuelan President Hugo Chávez, former U.S. President Barack Obama, and former Mexican President Enrique Peña Nieto.

== History ==
The company was founded in 1992 by Miguel Caballero as part of a graduation project at the University of Los Andes. He had the idea to produce fashionable clothes that incorporated protection from bullets. In 1993, Miguel Caballero conducted a test of one of his armoured garments by shooting a person wearing one, which led to the company slogan, "I was shot by Miguel Caballero."

He developed the first ever de-mining suits in 1995 in collaboration with the Colombian National Army.

Miguel Caballero is the first Latin American company to meet the NIJ 0101.04 standard (1996) and the NIJ 0101.06 standards (2001). In 2006, Caballero opened the first boutique specialising in armoured garments in Mexico City, and in 2009 the company opened its first production plant in Cota, Cundinamarca in Colombia. In 2013, the company obtained its first patent for an Armoured T-shirt product in Colombia. In addition to the boutique in Mexico, Miguel Caballero opened its second international corporate office in Guatemala City in 2014. In 2015, Miguel Caballero obtained the ISO 14001 certification, the MC4-G and S33 brands were launched, and the first patent in Mexico for the Armoured T-shirt product was acquired.

== Products ==
Miguel Caballero clothes claim to protect the wearer against bullets, knives, fire, water, and air. Caballero describes the material from which he creates his apparel as "a hybrid between nylon and polyester," which is lighter and thinner than Kevlar, a textile often used in body armour. Miguel Caballero currently markets 5 brands: Black, MC4-G, S33, Turer and Gold.

=== Black ===
The Black line consists of fashionable and inconspicuous armoured clothing: bulletproof vests, armoured jackets and T-shirts. The armored collection has been worn by heads of state, businessmen and celebrities. The company began by making bulletproof leather and suede jackets and now includes raincoats, blazers and a women's line.

=== MC4-G ===
MC4-G covers a range of products aiming to help with private security, such as armoured augmentations for motorised vehicles, bulletproof suitcases and backpacks, fashionable vests.

=== S33 ===
S33 is aimed at military and armed forces, intelligence and investigative groups, administrative tactical and criminology units, as well as state protection organizations at the national and international level. It covers the needs of public servants and their movable and immovable property including ships and aircraft.

=== Turer ===
The Turer provides motorcycle clothing.

=== Gold ===
The Gold line includes belts, trauma plates and bulletproof backpacks for kids.

== Certifications ==
- 8 NIJ certifications
- ISO 9001
- ISO 14001
- BASC
- ICONTEC
- IQNET
- IDIC
- RENAR
- F.A.N
- TNO

The clothing can withstand ammunition from weapons including the 9mm, .44 Magnum, .40 S&W, .45 ACP, .50 AE, 5.56, 7.62 mm NATO, 6.8mm SPC and a .50 caliber round.

== Recognition ==
In 2006, Miguel Caballero was selected as one of the 31 best business ideas in the world by Business 2.0 magazine. The company has been featured in The New York Times, The Economist, The Financial Times, CNN, BBC, BusinessWeek, VICE, Wired magazine, El Tiempo, El País, El Heraldo, Vanguardia, RCN Radio, The History Channel and The Discovery Channel.

== World presence ==
=== Americas ===
- Colombia
- United States
- El Salvador
- Nicaragua
- Costa Rica
- Panama
- Ecuador
- Peru

=== Europe ===
- Russia
- Netherlands
- Germany

=== Middle-East ===
- United Arab Emirates

=== Asia ===
- Philippines
- Thailand

== See also ==
- Aramid
- Ballistic vest
