= Banco AV Villas =

Colombian bank

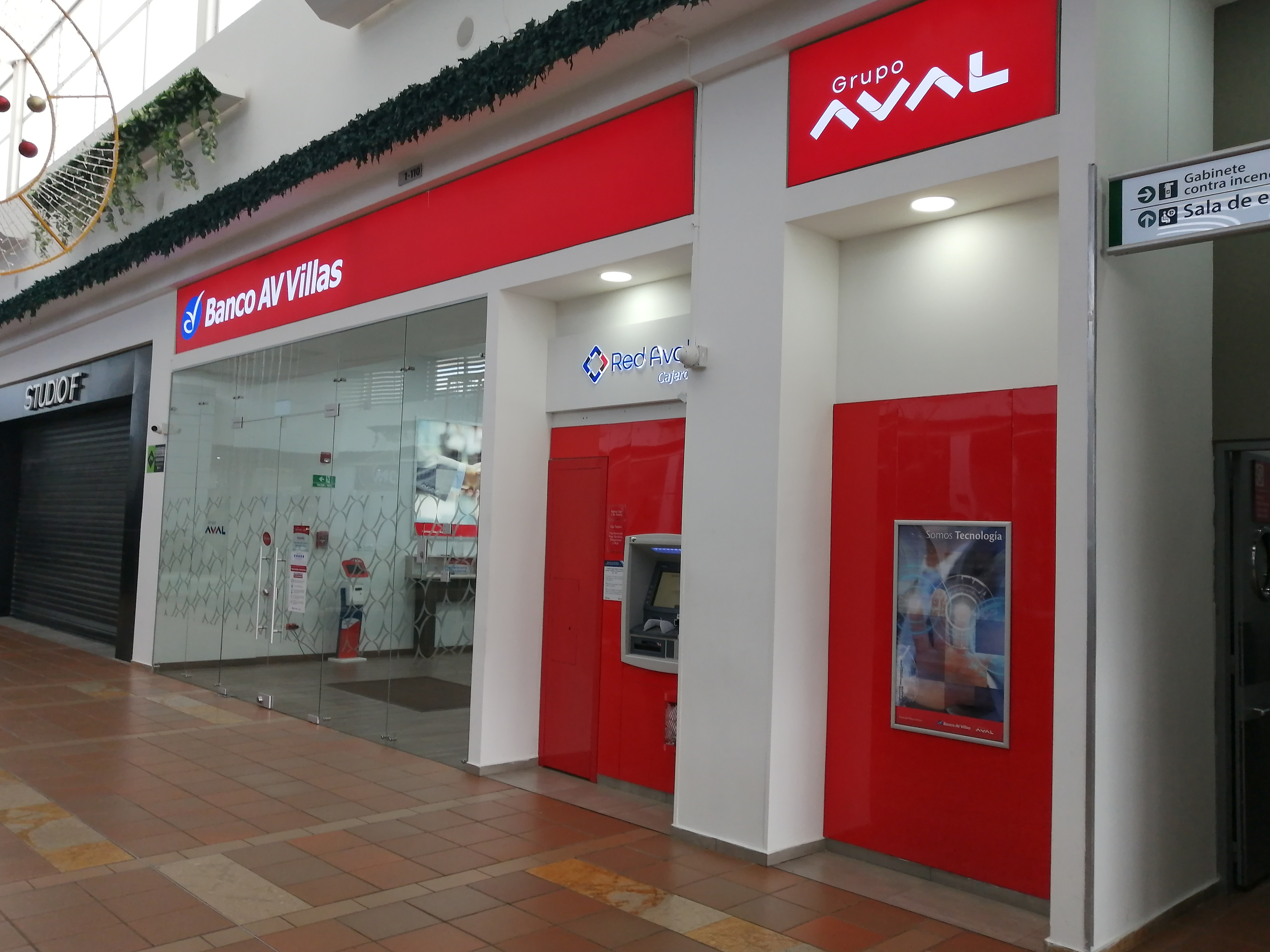
- Agency in Cucuta.
- Type: Private bank
- Traded as: BVC: SDVILLAS
- ISIN: COT14PA00019
- Industry: Financial services
- Founded: 1972
- Headquarters: Bogotá, Colombia
- Number of locations: 244 (2025)
- Area served: Colombia
- Key people: Gerardo Hernández Correa (Chairman)
- Total assets: COP 21 737 billion (2025) (USD 6,01 billion)
- Number of employees: 4480 (2025)
- Parent: Grupo Aval
- Website: www.avvillas.com.co

Banco AV Villas is a medium rage Colombian bank, is one of the four banks forming Grupo Aval.

== History ==
Founded in 1972 as Corporación de Ahorro y Vivienda Las Villas. In 1997 it became a subsidiary of Grupo Aval. In March 2002, AV Villas officially became a Commercial Bank.
