= Jet-Set (magazine) =

Colombian celebrity magazine

- Front cover of issue 196 of Jet-Set featuring heiress and socialite Tatiana Santo Domingo.
- Editor-in-Chief: Olga Viviana Guerrero Campo
- Categories: Celebrity, human interest, news
- Frequency: Fortnightly
- First issue: September 15, 1998
- Final issue: December 18, 2020
- Company: Publicaciones Semana S.A.
- Country: Colombia
- Based in: Bogotá, D.C.
- Language: Spanish
- Website: jetset.com.co
- ISSN: 0123-7918

Jet-Set was a Colombian-based fortnightly magazine profiling the glamorous, compelling and sometimes scandalous lives and happenings of Colombian and international celebrities, politicians, artists, and those of the elite and high-society, that is to say, those in the jet set. The magazine heavily relies on engaging editorials and vivid photographs depicting the stylish fashions worn, the exciting events attended, and the extravagant home décor of the rich and famous to captivate its readers' imagination.

== History and operations ==
The magazine was founded in 1998 as the tenth publication of Publicaciones Semana S.A. with Álvaro García Jiménez as its first editor-in-chief.

The magazine is based in Bogotá, D.C.

== See also ==
- Lists of magazines
- Media of Colombia
- ¡Hola!
