= Helados La Fresita =

Colombian Ice Cream Company

Helados La Fresita is an ice cream pop and paleta manufacturer in Medellín, Colombia. The frozen treats are sold by vendors around the city and in surrounding areas. The logo is marked by a strawberry caricature. The company's motto is: An ice cream with all the fruit (Un helado con toda la fruta!). Flavors include green mango, arequipe with raisins and coconut, coconut, lulo, peanut, guanabana (soursop), blackberry, strawberry, milk with raisins, and chocolate. The company also makes chocolate covered ice cream cones and ice cream sandwiches of various flavors, as well as fruit flavored ice pops (paletas de fruta), ice cream cups, and bulk ice cream boxes. The company was established in 1986.
