= Grupo Aval =

Colombian holding company engaged in financial services

Grupo Aval Acciones y Valores S.A.
- Type: Sociedad Anónima
- Traded as: BVC: GRUPOAVAL
- Industry: Holding
- Founded: 1994
- Headquarters: Bogotá, Colombia
- Area served: Colombia, Guatemala, El Salvador, Honduras, Nicaragua, Costa Rica, Panama, Grand Cayman, Bahamas, Barbados, United States
- Key people: Luis Carlos Sarmiento, (Chairman)
- Products: Financial services, Banking, Telecommunications, Real estate, Investing
- Revenue: ▲US$ 6.8 billion (2023)
- Net income: ▼US$ 514 million (2023)
- Number of employees: 74,036
- Website: www.grupoaval.com

Grupo Aval previous logo

Grupo Aval is a Colombian holding company engaged in a wide variety of financial activities, including banking, telecommunications and real estate, in Colombia and Central America. Grupo Aval is controlled by Luis Carlos Sarmiento (estimated net worth of U$11.9 billion), who indirectly owns around 80 percent of its shares.

== Operations ==
As a holding company, Grupo Aval owns sufficient amounts of voting stock in other companies to control their policies. In addition to its interests in numerous industrial sectors, Grupo Aval controls some of Colombia and Central America's top financial organizations, including:

- Banco de Bogotá S.A. (68.9% ownership) - which owns Multibank of Panama (100% ownership)
- Banco de Occidente S.A. (72.3% ownership)
- Banco Popular S.A. (93.7% ownership) which owns Corficolombiana (8.7% ownership)
- Banco AV Villas S.A. (79.9% ownership)
- BAC Credomatic (25% ownership)
- Casa de Bolsa S.A. in Colombia. BAC Valores(Panamá), Inc. BAC San Jose, Puesto de Bolsa, S.A. in Costa Rica.
- Porvenir S.A. (25% ownership), pension fund in Colombia

Grupo Aval's internal staff consists of approximately 100 employees, dedicated to analyzing and identifying the most efficient financial and operating practices as well as recommending the implantation of these practices within organizations that the group controls. To obtain these objectives, Grupo Aval is divided into three business divisions that include: (1) Investments and Strategic Planning, (2) Risk Management, (3) Corporative Services and (3) Technological Information.

== History ==
On April 18, 1997, the group formally changed its trading name from Administraciones Bancarias S.A. to Sociedad A.B. S.A. On January 8, 1998, the company once again changed its name to Grupo Aval Acciones y Valores S.A. Later that year, Grupo Aval introduced an online banking platform, which was integrated within the group's major banking subsidiaries: Banco de Bogotá, Banco de Occidente, Banco Popular and Banco AV Villas. This innovation allowed clients to conduct financial transactions either on the Internet or in real time at any of the banks' branch offices or automated teller machines.

A major milestone occurred during 1999 when Grupo Aval listed its shares publicly on the Bolsa de Valores de Colombia (the Colombian stock exchange) for the first time in the company's history. The group made an initial public offering of 1,200,774,970 shares of common stock between November 1 and December 31, 1999. By December 31, 1999, Aval had 40,042 shareholders. The final result of the IPO was the sale of 312,062,341 shares of common stock, or 2.58 percent of the total, with a fair market value of $58,190,135,296. In 2000, plans to list Grupo Aval on the New York Stock Exchange were postponed due to Wall Street's unfavorable climate for emerging market funds at the time.

As of 2007, Luis Carlos Sarmiento continued to run the company with assistance from his son Luis Carlos Sarmiento Gutierrez, whom he was grooming to eventually assume control of the family conglomerate.

Due to GE Capital focusing on industrial activities rather than retail banking, the group acquired the BAC|Credomatic Network from GE Consumer Finance for US$1.9 billion in July 2010.

Grupo Aval made a debut global offering of $600 million in February 2012 with advisory assistance from New York law firm Davis Polk & Wardwell.

== Regulation ==
The company is supervised by the Colombian Superintendency of Securities because of its size and because its shares are registered on the Colombia Stock Exchange.

== See also ==
- Banco de Bogotá
- Banco de Occidente Credencial
- BAC Credomatic
