= Crepes & Waffles =

Colombian restaurant chain

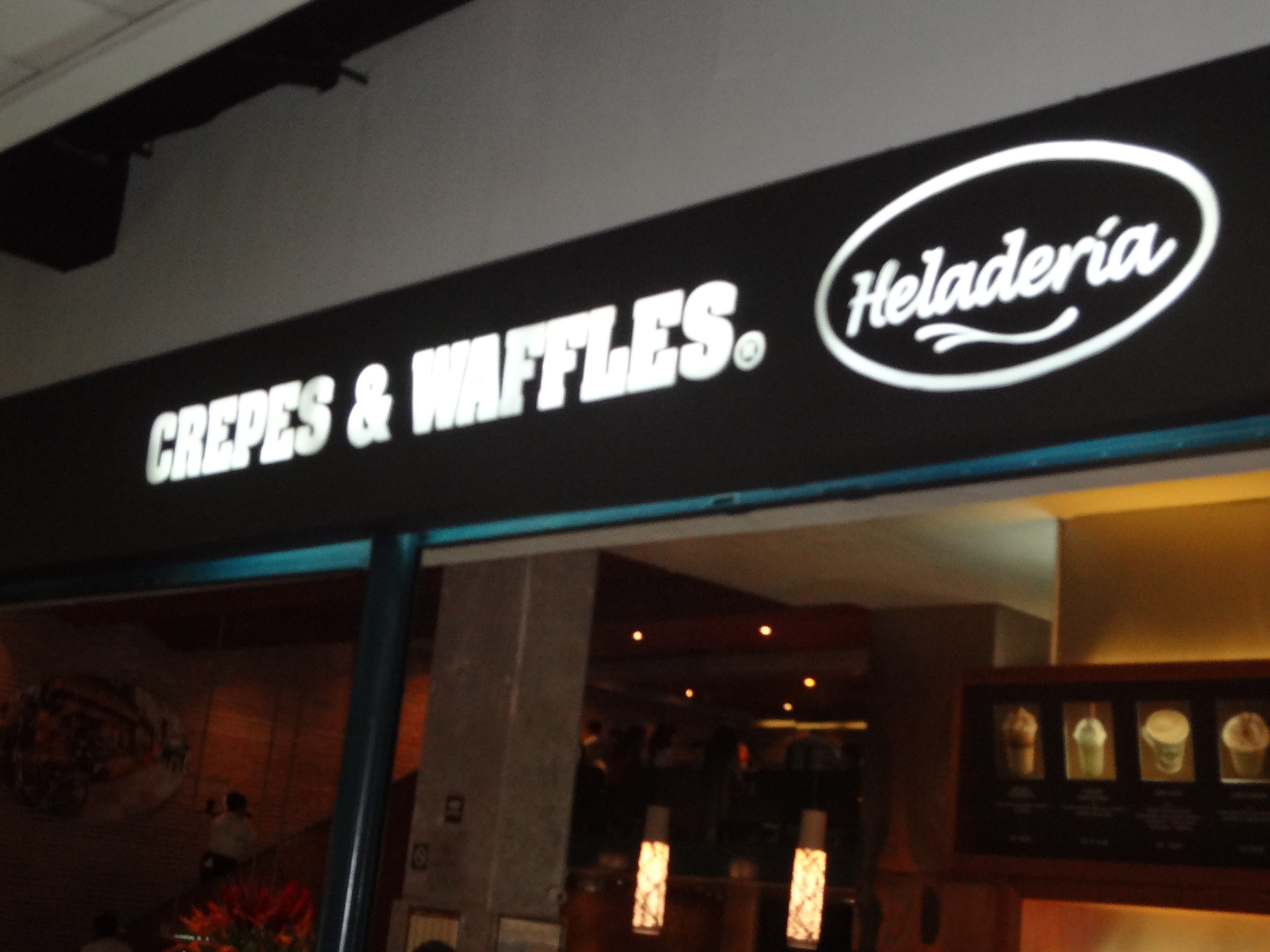
- Industry: Restaurant
- Founded: 1990, Bogotá
- Headquarters: Bogotá, Colombia,
- Products: Crêpes; Salads; Ice cream Waffles; Other food products
- Website: crepesywaffles.com

Crepes & Waffles is the third biggest restaurant chain in Colombia. The idea was born from a couple of Colegio de Estudios Superiores de Administracion (CESA) university students who were working on a project.

== History ==
Founded on April 13, 1980, two students of el CESA university, opened their first restaurant in Bogotá, Colombia in the style of a small rustic French crêperie. The chain now has restaurants in Spain and Peru, and many other countries. The last international restaurant that opened was inaugurated in São Paulo, Brazil.

== Restaurants ==
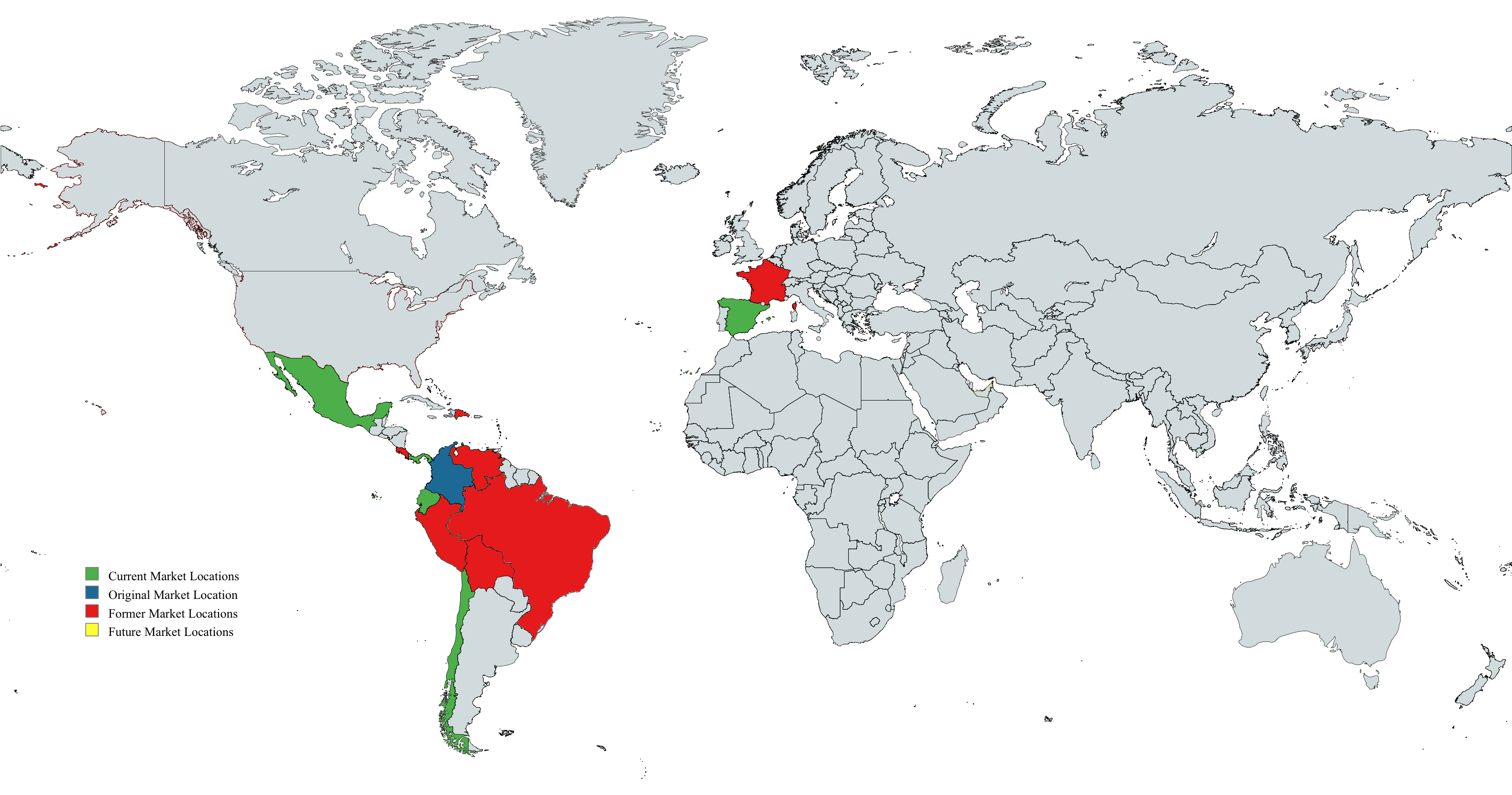
Map of countries with Crepes & Waffles

- Colombia: 84 Restaurants; 69 Ice Cream Shops
  - Barranquilla 4 Restaurants; 3 Ice Cream Shops.
  - Bogotá 43 Restaurants; 43 Ice Cream Shops.
  - Bucaramanga 3 Restaurants; 3 Ice Cream Shops.
  - Cali 8 Restaurants; 5 Ice Cream Shops.
  - Cartagena 5 Restaurants; 4 Ice Cream Shops.
  - Manizales 1 Restaurant
  - Medellín 17 Restaurants; 9 Ice Cream Shops.
  - Mosquera 1 Ice Cream Shop,
  - Pereira 2 Restaurants; 1 Ice Cream Shop.
  - Santa Marta 2 Restaurants; 1 Ice Cream Shop.
  - Villavicencio 2 Restaurants.
  - Cúcuta 1 Restaurant; 1 Ice Cream Shop. (Project)
  - Montería 1 Restaurant (Project)
- Chile: 3 Restaurants, 1 Ice Cream Shop (Santiago de Chile)
- Ecuador: 5 Restaurants; 5 Ice Cream Shops. (Quito)
- Spain: 4 Restaurants (Madrid)
- Mexico: 7 Restaurants
  - Ciudad de México 6 restaurants.
  - Naucalpan 1 restaurant.
- Panama: 4 Restaurants (Panamá)
- Peru: 4 Restaurants; 1 Ice Cream Shop
- Venezuela: 1 Restaurant (Caracas)
- Brazil: 1 Restaurant (São Paulo)
