= Banco de Bogotá =

Colombian bank

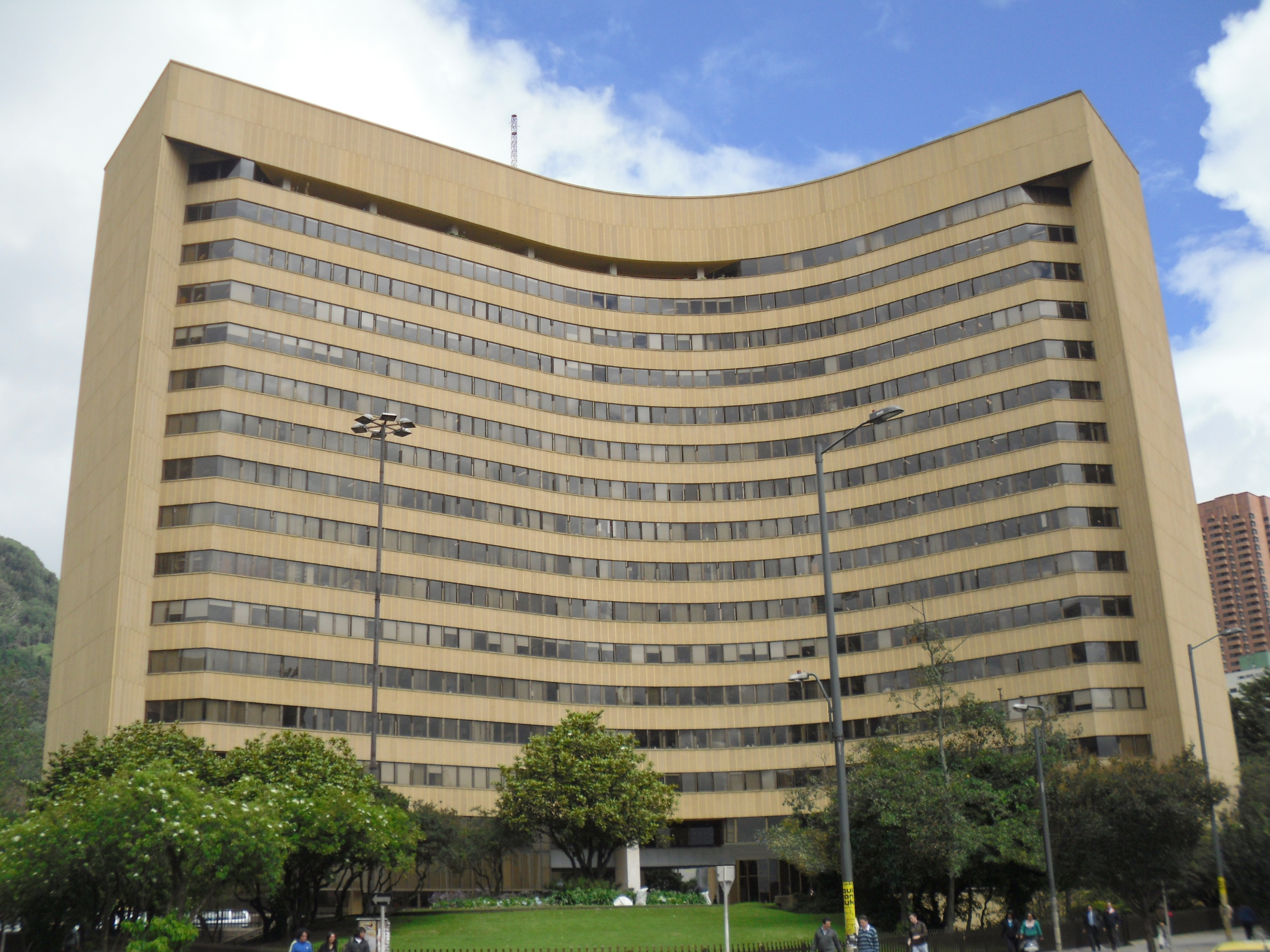
- Headquarters in Bogotá
- Type: Sociedad Anónima
- Traded as: BVC: BOGOTA
- ISIN: COB01CB00036
- Industry: Financial services
- Founded: 15 November 1870; 155 years ago
- Headquarters: Bogotá, Colombia
- Number of locations: 422 (2025)
- Area served: Colombia and Panama
- Key people: Juan Carlos Echeverry (Chairman and CEO)
- Products: Banking
- Revenue: COP 1.27 billion (2025) (USD 352.4 million)
- Total assets: COP 156.164 billion (2025) (USD 43.15 billion)
- Total equity: COP 17.294 billion (2025) (USD 4.78 billion)
- Number of employees: 14,513 (2025)
- Parent: Grupo Aval
- Website: www.bancodebogota.com

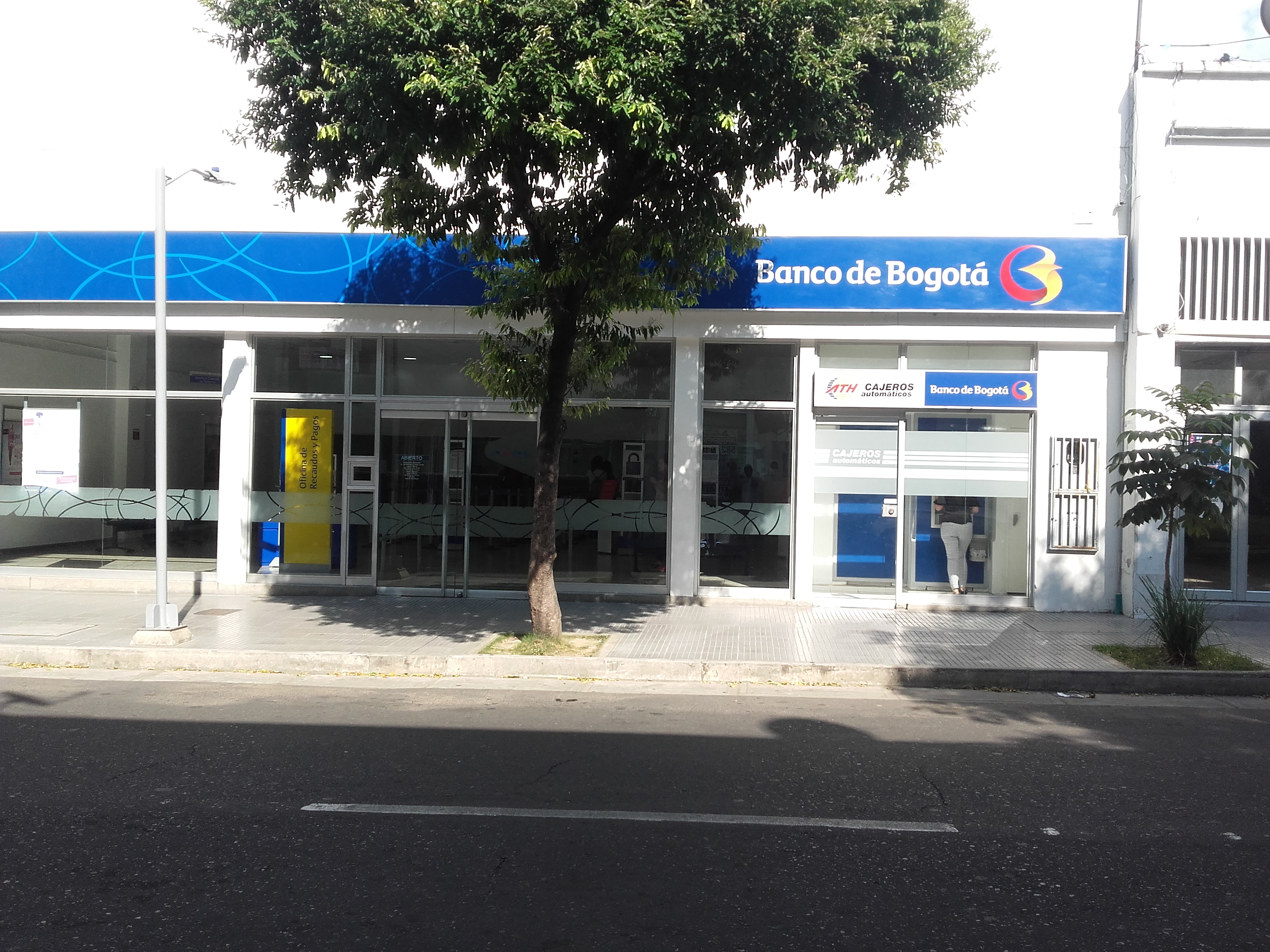
Agency in Cúcuta.

Banco de Bogotá (English: Bank of Bogotá), is a Colombian bank, is the first commercial bank established in Colombia. It is one of the Big Four banks in Colombia.

As of 2025 the bank had 4,145,359 customers. it also operates through subsidiaries: Corporacion Financiera Colombiana S.A., an investment bank; Almacenes Generales de Deposito Almaviva S.A., a products supply logistics company; Sociedad Fiduciaria Bogotá Fidubogotá S.A. and Fiduciaria del Comercio Fiducomercio S.A., trust and portfolio investment companies; Leasing Bogotá S.A., a leasing company; Valores Bogotá S.A., a provider of brokerage services; and Fondos de Pensiones y Cesantias Porvenir, a pensions and suspensions administrator. It also owns bank subsidiaries in Panama and the Bahamas. In the United States, Banco de Bogotá operates two agencies, one in New York City, New York, and one in Miami, Florida. It also has operations in Panama.

== History ==
Founded in 1870, Banco de Bogotá is the oldest commercial banking institution in Colombia.

In 1967, Banco de Bogotá went international and opened its first office in Panama.

In 1968, the merger with Banco de los Andes became effective. In 1992, the acquisition of Banco del Comercio took place. In 2006, Megabanco was acquired.

=== Software implementation ===
On June 20, 2006, Fidelity National Information Services (FIS), Inc. announced the successful implementation of its retail lending software package, Advanced Lending Solution (ALS) – Servicing Manager at Banco de Bogotá. The efforts of the bank's technical consultants and FIS experts enabled Banco de Bogotá to be the first financial institution in its market to introduce a new personal loan product, Prestamo Personal Libre Destino.

Banco de Bogotá has utilized FIS' deposits, savings, financial management and architecture to support its retail banking operations since 1988. Following a change in local banking regulations in the fourth quarter of 2005, the bank needed to upgrade its lending system quickly to launch a new consumer loan product into the market. Banco de Bogotá introduced the new product in February, ahead of its competitors, and captured a significant share of the market.

The bank selected FIS' ALS-Servicing Manager, a customizable loan processing application that supports customer and account servicing requirements for the life of the loan. The Banco de Bogotá team quickly adjusted the features for the Prestamo Personal Libre Destino, using ALS-Servicing Manager's real-time product parameter facility, to select processing options that addressed interest accruals, late charges and payment posting options. The bank expected to attract 3,000 new customers a month with this new personal loan product. It is also planning a follow-up phase, which will utilize ALS-Servicing Manager for a new line of credit product and add additional inquiry transaction functionality for the teller system.

=== Recent history ===
In december 2025, the bank announced that it had acquired Itaú's retail banking division in Colombia and Panama, adding 270,000 clients to its portfolio.

== Regulation ==
Banco de Bogotá is supervised by the Colombian Superintendency of Banking, which is primarily responsible for the regulation and supervision of Colombian financial institutions, including their foreign offices, subsidiaries, and affiliates. The Superintendency issues and promulgates supervisory regulations concerning accounting requirements, asset quality, management, operations, capital adequacy, loan classification and loan loss provision standards. In addition, the Superintendency monitors compliance by financial institutions with applicable laws and regulations and may order preventive measures and impose sanctions on financial institutions.

== Gallery ==
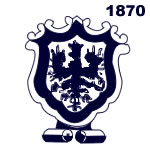
Logo 1870

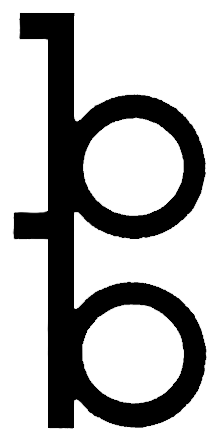
Logo 1969

Logo 1984

Logo 2008
