= Banco Cuscatlán =

Salvadoran multinational bank group

- Company type: Private
- Industry: Financial services, retail banking, commercial banking
- Predecessor: Grupo Cuscatlán (1972–2007)
- Founded: June 2016; 9 years ago
- Headquarters: San Salvador, El Salvador
- Area served: Colombia; El Salvador; Guatemala; Honduras; Panama
- Key people: Federico Antonio Nasser Facussé (President, Inversiones Cuscatlán Centroamérica)
- Number of employees: 4,000+ (2024)
- Website: www.bancocuscatlan.com

Banco Cuscatlán (also known as Inversiones Cuscatlán Centroamérica and Grupo Cuscatlán) is a financial institution and commercial bank primarily operating in Central America, with headquarters in San Salvador, El Salvador. The bank traces its history to the founding of the original Banco Cuscatlán in 1972, which became one of the largest banking groups in Central America and operated across multiple countries before its acquisition by Citigroup in 2007.

The modern Banco Cuscatlán is a legally distinct entity that was established following the Honduras-based investment group Grupo Terra acquired Citigroup's consumer banking operations in El Salvador in 2016, after which the historic brand was revived. As of 2024, the bank is the second-largest by assets in El Salvador and operates in Guatemala and Honduras.

== History ==
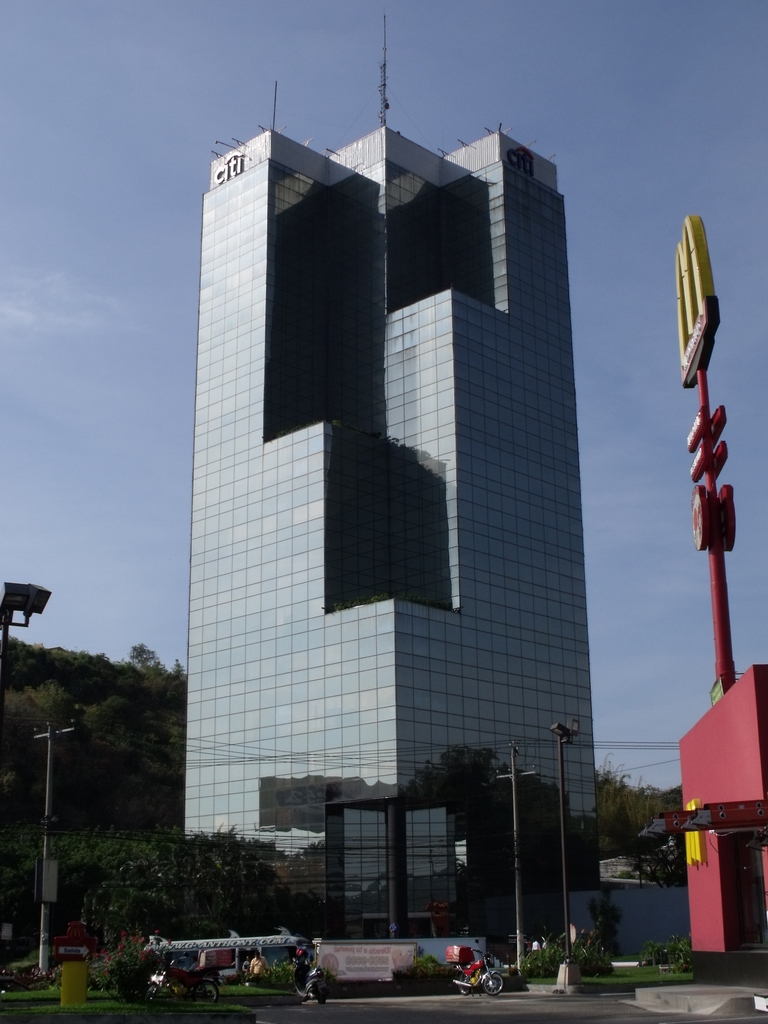
Exterior view of the Torre Cuscatlán in 2010

The Banco Cuscatlán logo prior to the 2007 acquisition. The "Disco de Jaguar" (Jaguar Disk) was used in the logo since 1972 and is a significant pre-Columbian stone carving from El Salvador, featuring a stylized jaguar face, linked to the ancient Cotzumalhuapa culture.

=== Original Banco Cuscatlán and Grupo Cuscatlán (1972–2007) ===
Banco Cuscatlán was founded in 1972 in El Salvador and subsequently became one of the leading financial groups in Central America. In 1984, Banco Cuscatlán became the first Salvadoran bank to install an automated teller machine (ATM). The bank's headquarters, Torre Cuscatlán, was completed in 1989 and became an iconic landmark in El Salvador, serving as the tallest building in the country from its completion until 2009.

By 2006, Grupo Cuscatlán operated across multiple Central American countries, including El Salvador, Guatemala, Costa Rica, Honduras, and Panama. The group, then controlled by Corporación UBC Internacional S.A., reported assets of $5.4 billion, loans of $3.5 billion, and deposits of $3.4 billion as of September 2006. The group served more than 45,000 corporate clients and 1.2 million consumer customers through 202 branches and 263 ATMs across the region, with approximately 5,000 employees.

==== Acquisition by Citigroup (2006–2007) ====
On December 13, 2006, Citigroup announced a definitive agreement to acquire the banking and financial subsidiaries of Grupo Cuscatlán from Corporación UBC Internacional S.A. for $1.51 billion in cash and Citigroup common stock. The acquisition was completed on May 11, 2007. The transaction included Grupo Cuscatlán's banking and financial intermediaries, including pension and insurance operations across Central America. Following the acquisition, Grupo Cuscatlán's operations were absorbed into Citigroup and integrated into Citi's consumer and corporate banking divisions across Central America.

=== Revival and Modern Institution (2016–present) ===
==== Acquisition by Grupo Terra (2016) ====
In June 2016, as part of Citigroup's strategic restructuring of its Latin American consumer banking operations, the Honduras-based investment group Grupo Terra acquired Citigroup's consumer banking and insurance businesses in El Salvador. Following the acquisition, the bank was rebranded as Banco Cuscatlán El Salvador and organized as a legally and institutionally distinct entity from the original Banco Cuscatlán that had existed prior to 2007, although it continued the consumer banking activities previously carried out by Citigroup in El Salvador, including credit card operations and insurance services through Seguros e Inversiones S.A. (SISA).

==== Acquisition of Scotiabank El Salvador (2019–2020) ====
In February 2019, Banco Cuscatlán's parent company, Imperia Intercontinental, announced an agreement to acquire Scotiabank's banking and insurance operations in El Salvador, including Scotiabank El Salvador, its subsidiaries, and Scotia Seguros. The transaction was completed in January 2020. This acquisition significantly expanded Banco Cuscatlán's market presence and established it as the second-largest bank in El Salvador by assets.

==== Regional Expansion (2022–present) ====
In 2022, Banco Cuscatlán expanded into Guatemala through the acquisition of Tarjetas de Crédito de Occidente, a credit card issuer, which was subsequently rebranded as Tarjetas Cuscatlán. This marked the bank's initial entry into the Guatemalan financial market.

In September 2023, Banco Cuscatlán expanded into Honduras following Inversiones Cuscatlán Centroamérica's acquisition of a controlling stake in Banco de los Trabajadores. The institution was rebranded as Banco Cuscatlán Honduras, initially operating 32 branches across the country.

In September 2025, Banco Cuscatlán officially launched full banking operations in Guatemala through the acquisition of 100% of the shares of Banco Inmobiliario, rebranding the bank as Banco Cuscatlán Guatemala operating 48 branches and 31 banking agents throughout the country.

In September 2025, Inversiones Cuscatlán Centroamérica completed the acquisition of La Hipotecaria, a mortgage lending company with operations in Panama, El Salvador, and Colombia.

In December 2025, Inversiones Cuscatlán Centroamérica announced an agreement to acquire the Panamanian bank Banistmo from Grupo Cibest for US$1.418 billion, pending regulatory approval from Panamanian authorities. Banistmo, Panama's fifth-largest bank by assets with over $10.4 billion in total assets and a loan portfolio exceeding $7.2 billion as of October 2025, operates 537,000 customer accounts and employs 2,000 staff members.

== Operations ==
Inversiones Cuscatlán Centroamérica, the holding company for Banco Cuscatlán and its subsidiaries, operates across Central America serving approximately 2.5 million customers and employing more than 4,000 people as of 2024. The broader group provides retail and commercial banking services, including current and savings accounts, credit facilities, credit cards, mortgage loans, and digital banking services across El Salvador, Guatemala and Honduras under the Banco Cuscatlán brand.

Seguros e Inversiones S.A. (SISA) is an insurance company based in El Salvador that operates as part of Inversiones Cuscatlán Centroamérica. It offers a wide range of insurance products for individuals and businesses and has been described by rating agencies as one of the largest insurers in the Salvadoran market by premium volume.

La Hipotecaria was acquired by Inversiones Cuscatlán Centroamérica in 2024 and it specializes mortgage lending and real estate financing businesses in El Salvador, Panama, and Colombia, providing home loan products and real estate credit services.

=== Principal subsidiaries ===
- Colombia
  - La Hipotecaria Colombia
- El Salvador
  - Banco Cuscatlán El Salvador
  - La Hipotecaria El Salvador
  - Seguros e Inversiones S.A.
  - Tarjetas Cuscatlán El Salvador
- Guatemala
  - Banco Cuscatlán Guatemala
  - Tarjetas Cuscatlán Guatemala
- Honduras
  - Banco Cuscatlán Honduras
- Panama
  - La Hipotecaria Panamá

== See also ==
- List of largest banks in Latin America
- List of banks in the Americas
- List of banks in Panama
- Economy of Colombia
- Economy of El Salvador
- Economy of Guatemala
- Economy of Honduras
