= List of banks in Panama =

The banking system system of Panama is mainly made up of private banks, much of it with international capital. During the last two decades of the 20th century, Panama's banking system has strengthened as one of the most important financial centers in Latin America. This is due to the legal facilities for establishing banks in Panama, support provided by the Government of Panama, its geographical location, its relative economic and political stability and the dollarization of its economy.

== History ==
The first attempts to create a banking institution in Panama date back to the time when the country was part of Gran Colombia; in 1826 the "Revenga Project" was created, which attempted to establish a national bank for Gran Colombia that would have its headquarters in Bogotá and three other branches located in Caracas, Guayaquil and Panama City; however, the project was never completed and the idea was discarded.

The first bank established in Panama dates back to 1861 and was known as the Banco de Circulación y Descuentos Pérez y Planas, which was in charge of circulating paper money that was printed by the American Bank Note Company. The Banco de Pérez y Planas cancelled its patent in 1867 and in 1869 a new bank called Banco de Panamá was established. In 1866 the Exchange Bank of Colon appeared, also in charge of issuing banknotes, but it quickly disappeared due to breach of contract in 1873. In 1865 and 1867 two banks were created, first the public Banco del Estado Soberano de Panamá, which in 1880 would become the issuer and the other the Banco de Ehrman, in charge of the purchase of foreign currency, which continued to operate after the separation of Panama from Colombia. In 1885 the Saving Bank was created based in Colón, but a fire destroyed the bank and it disappeared.

== Beginning of modern banking ==
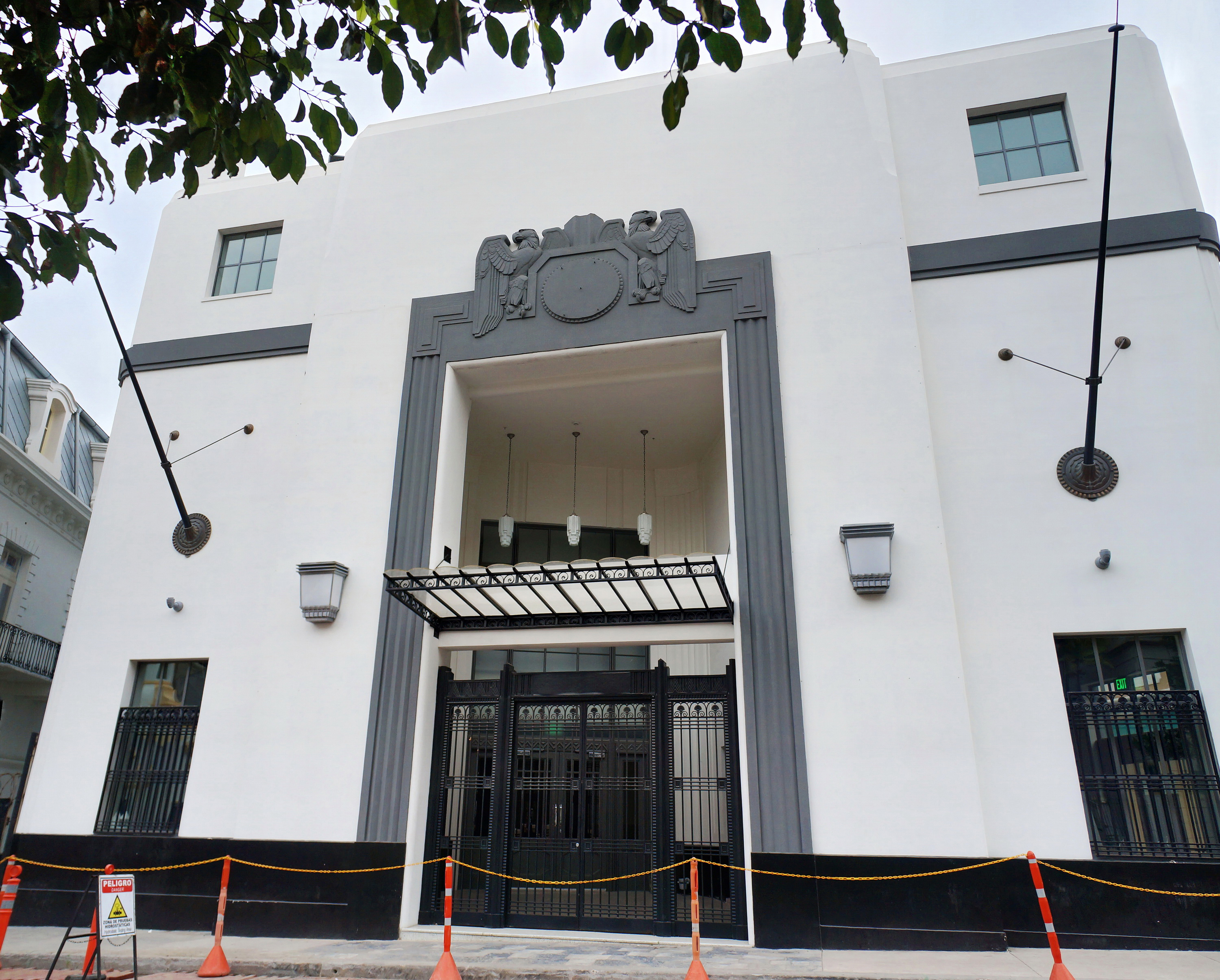
Headquarters of First National City Bank of New York in Casco Viejo, Panama

In 1903, the first two modern Panamanian banking institutions were created: the International Bank Corporation, which would later be called First National City Bank of New York, now Citibank, and the Banco Hipotecario y Prendario, which was enacted by law by Panamanian President Manuel Amador Guerrero on June 13 of that year and began operations shortly thereafter on October 12. The latter changed its name to the current Banco Nacional de Panamá, which initially financed the agricultural and livestock activity of that country. The Government of Panama also created Caja de Ahorros in 1934, an institution that was initially a mortgage institution that later expanded its services. Other notable banking institutions were Banque National de Paris, now BNP Paribas, the first bank with European capital established in Panama, and Banco General, founded in 1955, being the first Panamanian bank with private capital.

== Legislation ==
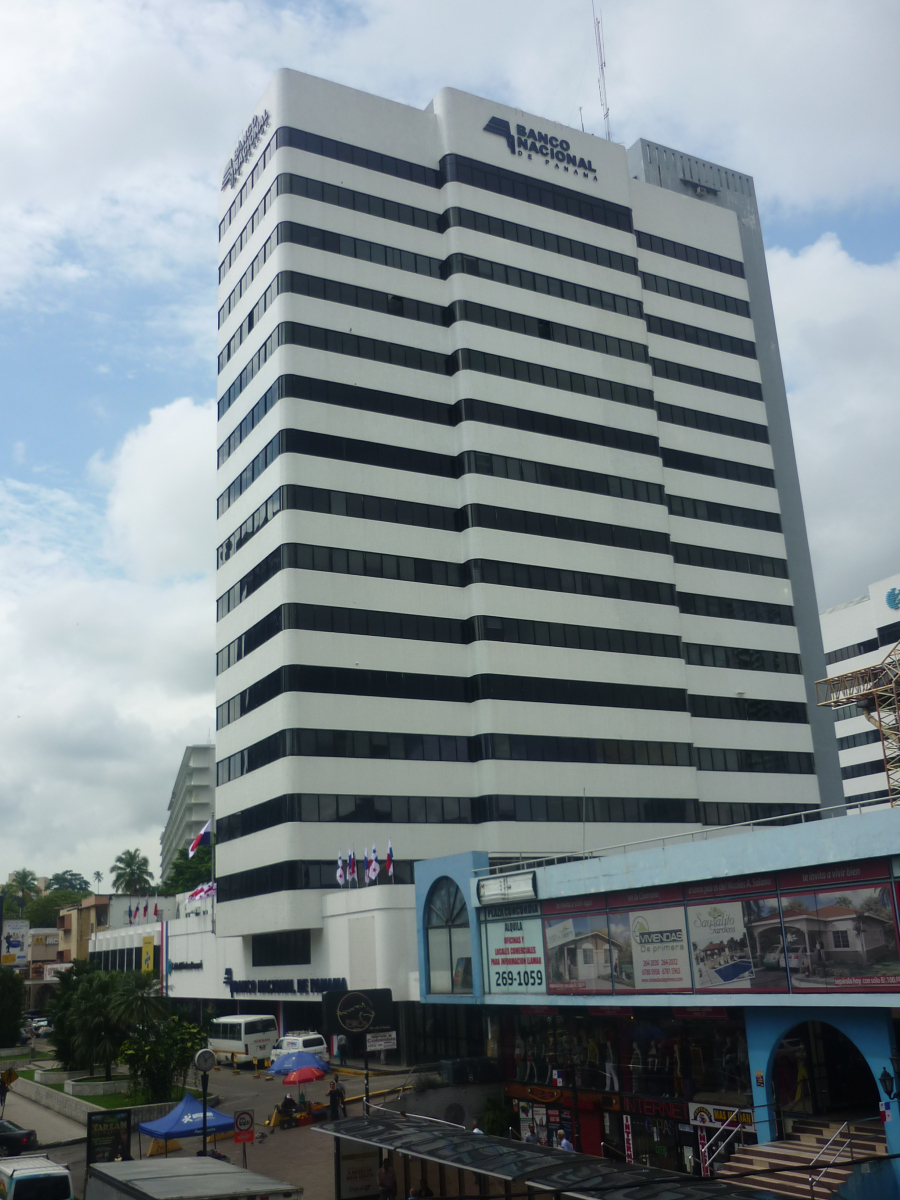
Headquarters of Banco Nacional de Panamá in Panama City

On July 8, 1941, Law 101 was passed, regulating banking activity in Panama, leaving the Ministerio de Hacienda y Tesoro (Ministry of Finance and Treasury) in charge of controlling the banking system and the Contraloría General de la República (Comptroller General of the Republic) in charge of supervising it. Despite this, activity grew rapidly and without major controls, so the government had to adopt legal measures to avoid financial problems. Thus, Cabinet Decree No. 238 was approved on July 2, 1970, establishing the first Banking Law in that country, which created the Comisión Bancaria Nacional (National Banking Commission) as an entity promoting banking activity in Panama.

The Cabinet Decree No. 238 allowed the development of the International Banking Center in Panama City, promoting the arrival of capital from several banks oriented mainly towards financing in Latin America. Since then, Panama has become one of the main financial centers in the region.

It was not until February 26, 1998, that a regulatory body for banking activity was established in Panama, when the Superintendencia de Bancos de Panamá (Superintendency of Banks of Panama) was created.

== List of banks in Panama ==
The following list shows the banks that are registered with the Superintendencia de Bancos de Panamá (Superintendency of Banks of Panama) as of September 2024. Banks operating in Panama are classified into three types: those with a general license, which allows them to conduct both domestic and international operations; those with an international license, which allows them to operate only outside of Panama; and representative offices, which serve as liaison offices without conducting banking activities within the country. An official bank is a bank owned by the Government of Panama.

Bank	Type of bank	Country of origin of Capital	Founded	Notes
AllBank	General license	Venezuela	2011	Bank in forced liquidation.
Atlas Bank	General license	United States	2016	Bank in forced liquidation.
BAC Credomatic	General license	Colombia	1995	
Banco Aliado	General license	Panama	1992	
Banco Azteca	General license	Mexico	2005	
Banco Davivienda	General license	Colombia	1966	
Banco de Bogotá	General license	Colombia	2013	
Banco Delta	General license	Panama	2006	
Banco Ficohsa	General license	Honduras	2013	
Banco General	General license	Panama	1955	
Banco Nacional de Costa Rica	General license	Costa Rica	1976	
Banco La Hipotecaria	General license	Panama	2010	
Banco LAFISE Panamá	General license	Panama	2010	
Banco Latinoamericano de Comercio Exterior (Bladex)	General license	Multinational	1979	
Banco Nacional de Panamá	General license	Panama	1904	Official Bank
Banco Pichincha	General license	Ecuador	2006	
Banco Prival	General license	Panama	2010	
Bancolombia	General license	Colombia	2012	
Banesco Panamá	General license	Venezuela	2007	
BANISI	General license	Ecuador	2008	
Banistmo	General license	Panama	2010	
Bank of China	General license	China	1994	
BBP Bank	General license	Ecuador	2009	
BCT Bank International	General license	Costa Rica	2008	
Bi-Bank	General license	Guatemala	2016	
Caja de Ahorros	General license	Panama	1934	Official Bank
Canal Bank	General license	Panama	2014	
Citibank	General license	United States	2014	
Credicorp Bank	General license	Panama	1993	
Global Bank	General license	Panama	1994	
Industrial and Commercial Bank of China	General license	China	2021	
Keb Hana Bank	General license	South Korea	1980	
Mega International Commercial Bank	General license	Taiwan	1974	
Mercantil Banco	General license	Venezuela	1978	
Metrobank	General license	Panama	1991	
MMG Bank	General license	Panama	2003	
Multibank	General license	Colombia	1987	
Pacific Bank	General license	Honduras	2013	
St. Georges Bank	General license	Nicaragua	2004	
Scotiabank	General license	Canada	1974	Bank in voluntary liquidation, Panama operations acquired by Davivienda.
Towerbank	General license	Panama	1971	
Unibank	General license	Panama	2010	
Atlantic Security Bank	International license	Cayman Islands	1984	
Austrobank Overseas	International license	Ecuador	1995	
Banco Davivienda Internacional	International license	Colombia	2015	
Banco de Bogotá	International license	Colombia	1988	
Banco de Crédito del Perú	International license	Peru	2002	
Banco de Occidente	International license	Colombia	2015	
Bancolombia	International license	Colombia	1973	
Banco Popular Dominicano	International license	Dominican Republic	1983	
BBVA	International license	Colombia	2025	
BHD International Bank	International license	Dominican Republic	2006	
BPR Bank	International license	Dominican Republic	2016	
ES Bank	International license	Portugal	2001	Bank in forced liquidation.
FBP Bank	International license	Panama	2011	Bank in forced liquidation.
GNB Sudameris Bank	International license	United Kingdom	1970	
Inteligo Bank	International license	Bahamas	1997	
Itaú	International license	Colombia	1998	
Abanca	Representative office	Spain	2014	
Banco General Overseas	Representative office	Cayman Islands	1986	
Commerzbank	Representative office	Germany	2007	
EFG International	Representative office	Switzerland	2023	
JP Morgan Chase	Representative office	United States	2011	
Mercantil Bank Schweiz	International license	Switzerland	2025	
Proven Bank	Representative office	Saint Lucia	2015	
Safra National Bank of New York	Representative office	United States	2008	
UBS AG	Representative office	Switzerland	2007	
UBS Switzerland AG	Representative office	Switzerland	2015	

== Defunct banks of Panama ==
The following list provides banks that have ceased operations in Panama. These closures may have occurred for a variety of reasons, including mergers, acquisitions, financial insolvency, or regulatory measures.

Bank	Country of origin of Capital	Years of operation	Notas
ABN AMRO	Netherlands	1971-2001	Operations in Panama acquired by Banco Mercantil del Istmo.
Balboa Bank & Trust	Panama	2005-2017	Acquired by BCT Bank International, following the bank's reorganization after facing sanctions from U.S. authorities for alleged links to a money laundering network based in Panama.
Bancafé Panamá	Colombia	1976-2012	The parent company, Bancafé Colombia, merged with Banco Davivienda.
Banco Agro Industrial y Comercial de Panamá	Panama	1977-1996	Ceased operations due to illiquidity, and accused of fraud, criminal association, and falsification of documents.
Banco Continental	Panama	1972-2007	Acquired by Banco General.
Banco Comercial de Panamá (Bancomer)	Panama	1979-2000	Acquired by Banco General.
Banco Cuscatlán	El Salvador	1994-2008	Operations in Panama acquired by Citibank, merged with Banco Uno to form Citibank (Panama) S.A.
Banco del Pacífico	Ecuador	1980-2019	Panama operations acquired by investors to form Pacific Bank.
Banco de Ultramar	Panama	1978-1993	Bankruptcy due to mismanagement and money laundering.
Banco de Desarrollo Industrial (Banco DISA)	Panama	1985-2002	Forced liquidation ordered by the Superintendency of Banks due to mismanagement and fraud.
Banco do Brasil	Brazil	1973-2019	Ceased operations in Panama.
Banco Exterior	Panama	1966-2000	Acquired by BBVA.
Banco Ganadero	Panama	1980-1999	Acquired by BBVA.
Banco G&T Continental	Guatemala	2008-2019	Merged with GTC Bank.
Banco Institucional Patria de Ahorro y Préstamo	Panama	1989-1990	General Manuel Noriega, Panamanian dictator and military officer who was the de facto ruler of Panama from 1983 to 1989, opened the bank to the public on January 16, 1989. Noriega had been indicted by the United States on drug-trafficking charges in 1988. The bank ceased operations through a voluntary liquidation in February 1990, just weeks after the United States invasion of Panama.
Banco Internacional	Panama	1973-2002	Acquired by Banco Continental.
Banco Interoceánico	Panama	1970-1994	Bankruptcy due to mismanagement and money laundering.
Banco de Latinoamérica (Bancolat)	Panama	1982-2001	Acquired by Banistmo.
Banco Mercantil del Istmo	Panama	1966-2003	Merged with parent company Banistmo.
Banco Trasatlántico	Panama	1979-2012	Acquired by Balboa Bank & Trust.
Banco Panamá	Panama	2008-2020	Acquired by Banco Aliado.
Banco Panameño de la Vivienda (Banvivienda)	Panama	1981-2018	Acquired by Global Bank.
Banca Privada d'Andorra	Andorra	2011-2015	Ceased operations in Panama after the bankruptcy of the parent company and a forced liquidation.
Banco Rio Internacional	Argentina	1977-1991	Ceased operations in Panama after a voluntary liquidation.
Banco Universal	Panama	1994-2016	Acquired by Canal Bank.
Banco Uno	Panama	1994-2008	Acquired by Citibank, merged with Banco Cuscatlán to form Citibank (Panamá) S.A.
BBVA	Spain	1983-2013	Operations in Panama acquired by BAC Credomatic.
Bank Hapoalim	Israel	1981-2017	Ceased operations in Panama due to being involved in the Panama Papers.
Bank Leumi	Israel	1982-2015	Ceased operations in Panama due to low profits and high regulatory costs.
Bank Mizrahi-Tefahot	Israel	2008-2017	Ceased operations in Panama.
Bank of America	United States	1963-1985	Operations in Panama acquired by Banco General.
BNP Paribas	France	2006-2010	Operations in Panama acquired by Scotiabank.
Capital Bank	Panama	2008-2023	Acquired by Mercantil Banco.
Cathay International Bank	China	2000-2004	Ceased operations in Panama after a voluntary liquidation.
Chase Manhattan Bank	United States	1955-2000	Operations in Panama acquired by HSBC.
Chohung Bank	South Korea	1983-1998	Ceased operations in Panama after parent company merged with Kangwon Bank and Hyundai Merchant Bank.
Crèdit Andorrà	Andorra	2008-2023	Ceased operations in Panama after a voluntary liquidation. Wealth management division continues to operate in Panama.
Citibank Panamá	Panama	2008-2015	Acquired by Scotiabank.
Dai-Ichi Kangyo Bank	Japan	1978-2002	Ceased operations in Panama after the parent company merged with Fuji Bank and Industrial Bank of Japan.
Daiwa Bank	Japan	1978-2002	Ceased operations in Panama after the parent company merged with Asahi Bank.
Dresdner Bank	Germany	1971-2009	Ceased operations in Panama after parent company merged with Commerzbank.
HSBC Bank Panama	Panama	2008-2013	Acquired by Bancolombia, renamed to Banistmo.
Interbank	Peru	2010-2020	Ceased operations in Panama.
Julius Baer	Switzerland	2006-2019	Ceased operations in Panama following a strategic review of its Latin American unit.
Lloyds TSB Bank	United Kingdom	1990-2004	Operations in Panama acquired by Banco Cuscatlán, merged with Panabank to form Banco Cuscatlán-Panabank.
Long-Term Credit Bank of Japan	Japan	1982-1998	Ceased operations in Panama after the bankruptcy of the parent company.
MiBanco	Panama	1997-2014	Ceased operations after a voluntary liquidation.
Mitsubishi Trust and Banking Corporation	Japan	1981-2005	Ceased operations in Panama after parent company merged with UFJ Trust Bank.
Mizuho Corporate Bank	Japan	2002-2013	Ceased operations in Panama after parent company merged with Mizuho Bank.
Panabank	Panama	1984-2004	Acquired by Banco Cuscatlán, merged with Lloyds TSB Bank Panamá to form Banco Cuscatlán-Panabank.
Pribanco	Panama	1962-2001	Acquired by Banistmo.
Primer Banco del Istmo (Banistmo)	Panama	1984-2008	Acquired by HSBC, renamed to HSBC Bank Panama.
Produbank	Ecuador	2005-2015	Acquired by St. Georges Bank.
Republic National Bank	United States	1971-1999	Ceased operations in Panama after parent company merged HSBC.
Royal Bank of Canada	Canada	1975-1987	Ceased operations in Panama following a strategic review of its Latin American unit.
Sakura Bank	Japan	1987-1993	Ceased operations in Panama after a voluntary liquidation.
Sanwa Bank	Japan	1980-1998	Ceased operations in Panama after a voluntary liquidation.
State Bank of India	India	1979-1997	Ceased operations in Panama after a voluntary liquidation.
Sumitomo Bank	Japan	1978-1993	Ceased operations in Panama after a voluntary liquidation.

== See also ==
- List of largest banks in Latin America
- List of banks in the Americas
- Economy of Panama
