= HSBC Bank Costa Rica =

Subsidiary of HSBC Holdings plc headquartered in San José, Costa Rica

Banco HSBC (Costa Rica), S.A.
- Company type: Subsidiary of HSBC Holdings plc
- Industry: Finance and Insurance
- Founded: 2006
- Defunct: 2012
- Fate: Become Banco Davivienda Costa Rica
- Headquarters: San José, Costa Rica
- Key people: Francisco F. Coccaro, CEO
- Products: Financial services

Banco HSBC (Costa Rica), S.A. was a subsidiary of HSBC Holdings plc headquartered in San José, Costa Rica. The bank provided personal banking and corporate banking services to Costa Rica. In 2012 Banco Davivienda acquired HSBC Costa Rica and renamed it as Banco Davivienda Costa Rica.

== History ==
In November 2006, HSBC acquired Grupo Banistmo, the leading banking group in Central America, giving HSBC access to new markets, with operations in Colombia, Costa Rica, El Salvador, Honduras, Nicaragua, and Panama.

Following the acquisition, HSBC rebranded Banistmo's operations in Costa Rica under the HSBC name. By 2011, HSBC Costa Rica served retail, commercial, and corporate banking clients through 29 branches, with total assets amounting to approximately US$1.4 billion as of September 30, 2011.

In January 2012, as part of a strategic plan to streamline its operations and focus on core markets, HSBC announced the sale of its businesses in Costa Rica, El Salvador, and Honduras to Banco Davivienda for US$801 million. The sale of the Costa Rican operation was valued at US$300 million.

In December 2012, the transaction was completed. Banco Davivienda took over HSBC Costa Rica's operations and rebranded them as Banco Davivienda (Costa Rica) S.A., Davivienda Puesto de Bolsa (Costa Rica) S.A., and Davivienda Sociedad Agencia de Seguros (Costa Rica) S.A.

== See also ==
- List of banks in Costa Rica
- List of banks in the Americas
