= Banco Davivienda El Salvador =

Bank in El Salvador

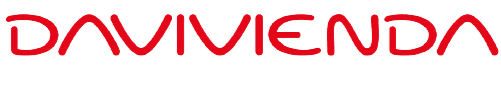

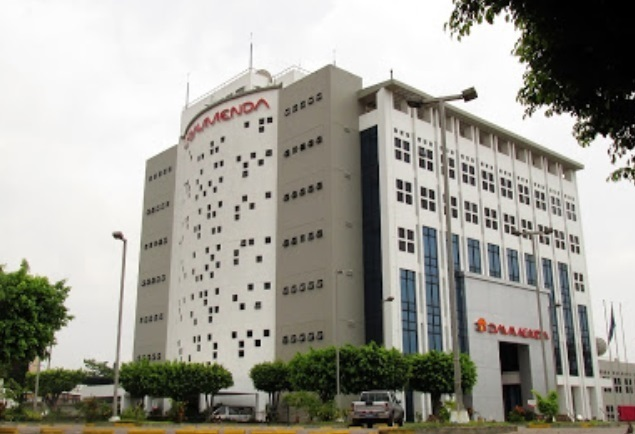
- Headquarters in San Salvador.
- Type: Subsidiary
- Industry: Finance and Insurance
- Founded: 1891; 135 years ago
- Headquarters: San Salvador, El Salvador
- Number of locations: 54 (2025)
- Key people: Gerardo Jose Siman-Siri, CEO
- Products: Banking and Insurance
- Total assets: USD 3,87 billion (2025)
- Number of employees: 1720 (2025)
- Parent: Davivienda
- Website: www.davivienda.com.sv

Banco Davivienda El Salvador, is the third largest bank in El Salvador.

== History ==
In 1891 the bank, merged with the branch there of Anglo-South American Bank under the name Banco Salvadoreño (Bancosal). The bank came to an agreement with Banco Internacional de El Salvador, which had a 25-year monopoly on note issuance, so that it too could issue notes. The government of El Salvador nationalized the bank in 1980 as part of a blanket nationalization of financial institutions, but privatized the bank in 1993.

In November 2006, HSBC acquired Grupo Banistmo (Banistmo), a Panamanian banking group that owned Panama's leading bank, Primer Banco del Istmo, and 106 other branches in Costa Rica, Honduras, Colombia and Nicaragua, as well as 56.2% of the holding company that owned Bancosal. The next year, HSBC extended two tender offers to acquire the remaining shares in the bank. The bank changed its name to Banco HSBC Salvadoreño and then to HSBC El Salvador.

HSBC sold its operations in El Salvador to Colombian bank Davivienda in 2012 and the bank was renamed Banco Davivienda El Salvador.

In 2023, the parent company established Holding Davivienda Internacional. based in Panama to structurally unite and manage its Central American subsidiaries (Costa Rica, El Salvador, and Honduras).
