= Banco Davivienda Panama =

Panamanian bank

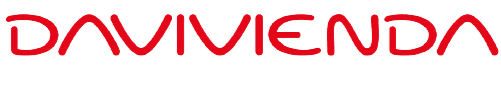

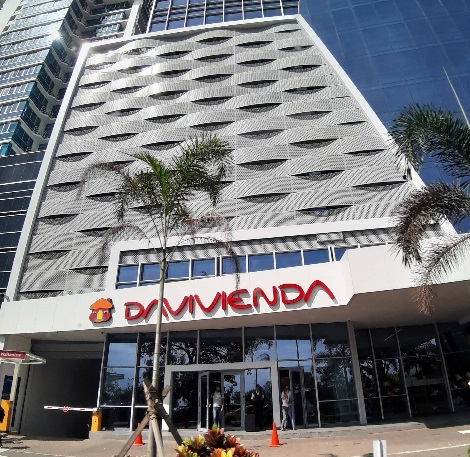
- Headquarters of the Bank
- Type: Subsidiary
- Industry: Financial services
- Founded: August 2007; 19 years ago
- Headquarters: Panama City, Panama
- Number of locations: 14 (2025)
- Area served: Panama
- Key people: Joanna Crooks (CEO)
- Total assets: USD 5,4 billion (2025)
- Number of employees: 868 (2025)
- Parent: Davivienda
- Website: www.davivienda.com.pa

Banco Davivienda Panama is a medium-sized Panamanian bank and subsidiary of Colombian bank Davivienda. It initially focused on corporate banking, however since 2025 it has started working as a retail bank.

== History ==
Davivienda expanded by acquiring Bancafé from the Colombian government for US$938 million. While the core of Bancafé's business was focused on the Colombian agricultural sector, the transaction included its established international operations—specifically its branches in Miami and its fully licensed banking operations in Panama since 1966.

In 2023, the parent company established Holding Davivienda Internacional, based in Panama, to structurally unite and manage its Central American subsidiaries (Costa Rica, El Salvador, and Honduras).

On January 6, 2025, Scotiabank and Davivienda announced a merger agreement through which Scotiabank would own 20% of Davivienda, and the latter would absorb Scotiabank Colpatria (Colombia), Scotiabank Panama, and Scotiabank Costa Rica. These operations would be subject to regulatory approvals throughout 2025. During the integration, Davivienda would operate its subsidiary and Davibank in parallel.

== See also ==
- Banking in Panama
