= Banking in Panama =

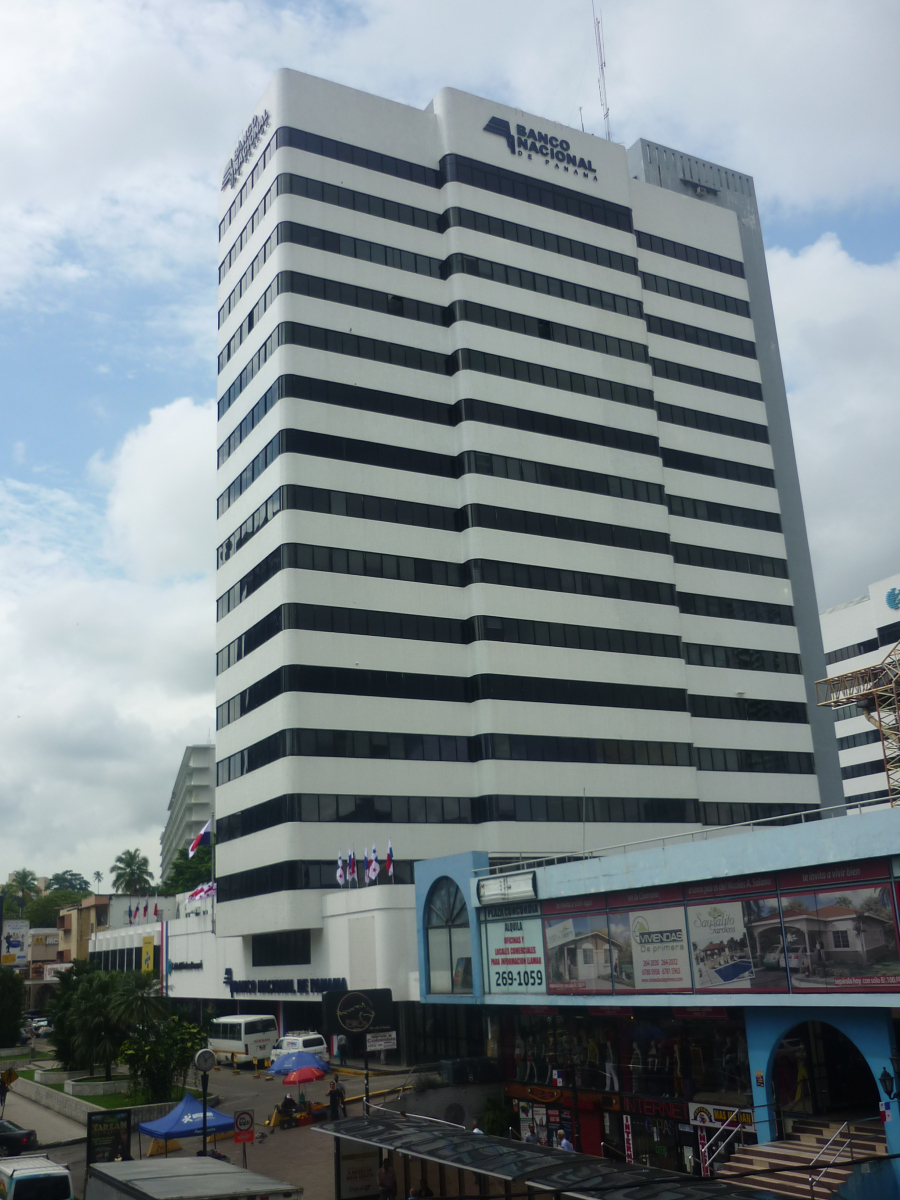
National Bank of Panama, on Via España in Panama City.

Panama has a substantial financial services sector. The sector grew up providing trade finance for trade passing through the Panama Canal, and later evolved into money laundering for the drug trade under Manuel Noriega.

Panama has had two Panamanian government-owned banks: the National Bank of Panama (Spanish: Banco Nacional de Panamá) (BNP) and Caja de Ahorros de Panamá (Savings Bank of Panama). Panama has never had a central bank, and the BNP was responsible for nonmonetary aspects of central banking in Panama, assisted by the National Banking Commission (Superintendencia del Mercado de Valores), which was created along with the country's International Financial Center, and was charged with licensing and supervising banks.

As of January 2009, BNP held deposits of about US$5 billion, while the Savings Bank held deposits or about US$1 billion.

As Panama has no central bank to act as a lender of last resort to rescue banks that get in trouble, Panamanian banks are very conservatively run, with an average capital adequacy ratio of 15.6% in 2012, nearly double the legal minimum requirement.

In 1970 the government passed a banking law that allowed for a very liberal and open banking system, without any government agency of consolidated banking supervision, and confirmed that no taxes could be imposed on interest or transactions generated in the financial system. The number of banks jumped from 23 in 1970 to 125 in 1983, most of them being international banks. The banking law promoted international lending, and because Panama has a territorial tax system, profits from loans or transactions made offshore are tax free.

After the 2008 financial crisis, the country tried to shake off its reputation as a tax haven, signing double taxation treaties with many (mostly OECD) countries.

United States citizens, residents and green card holders opening a bank account in Panama, as in other countries, have since 2010 been subject to the US Foreign Account Tax Compliance Act (FATCA), in addition to Panamanian regulations. In April 2011, Panama entered into a treaty with the United States on the exchange of financial information.

== Licensing ==
Banks in Panama are licensed and regulated by the Banking Supervisory Authority (Superintendencia de Bancos). Banks may be licensed as either:

- General (full) license Class A - these banks can operate both within and outside Panama. The majority of banks in Panama have this license.
- International license Class B - these banks are physically present in Panama, but can only do business with foreigners and non-Panamanian residents. They can only open accounts and accept deposits from individuals or organizations located overseas.

There are also the two state owned banks in Panama that can only do business within Panama: the National Bank of Panama (Spanish: Banco Nacional de Panamá) (BNP) and Caja de Ahorros de Panamá (Savings Bank of Panama).

== See also ==
- Economy of Panama
- List of banks in Panama
- Foreign Account Tax Compliance Act (FATCA)
- Panama Papers
