= Civitatis =

Spanish online platform for tours and activities

- Type: Private company
- Industry: Travel technology, Tourism
- Founded: 2008
- Founders: Alberto Gutiérrez Pascual
- Headquarters: Madrid, Spain
- Products: Online tours and activities booking platform
- Number of employees: 360+
- Website: civitatis.com

Civitatis is a Spanish online platform for booking guided tours, day trips and activities, founded in 2008 by Alberto Gutiérrez Pascual in Madrid, Spain. It is the leading curated marketplace for tours and activities in the Spanish and Portuguese speaking markets. By 2025 the platform offered over 97,000 activities across more than 4,270 destinations worldwide and had served more than 30 million customers. Civitatis has been cashflow-positive since its founding and grew entirely without external investment for its first 14 years.

== Founding ==
Alberto Gutiérrez Pascual was born in Valladolid, Spain in 1983. At 14 he was among the first in his city to have internet at home, and he quickly started building websites. He paid for his travels by writing city guides and eventually worked out a way to sell guided tours online. There was no formal business plan. As he later told PhocusWire, the key to his success was an ability to do a little of everything, from coding to finding partners to accounting, though he acknowledged it was "not easy to replicate."

Civitatis launched in 2008. The early years were lean. The company opened its first office in 2014, by which point it had six employees. In 2013 the platform had made a significant shift, moving from a directory of travel guides to a full e-commerce operation, selling activities in destinations where it had no guides of its own. The focus on Spanish-language content turned out to be the right bet. Competitors largely ignored that market, and Civitatis built up a loyal user base across Spain and Latin America without spending on paid acquisition.

== Growth and investment ==
For 14 years Gutiérrez retained full ownership and the company grew entirely on its own cash. That changed in April 2022, when Vitruvian Partners, a London-based private equity firm with roughly $20 billion in active funds and a history of backing companies like Skyscanner, Just Eat, Wise and Farfetch, made an initial investment of approximately €100 million. PhocusWire and Travolution both covered the deal independently, noting it was the first outside capital the company had ever taken.

Two years later, in June 2024, Vitruvian increased its stake with a further $50 million. Importantly, the new money was a secondary transaction. Civitatis had no need for primary capital, having been profitable since day one. Sophie Bower-Straziota, a partner at Vitruvian, noted publicly that the company had grown at roughly 50 percent per year while maintaining profitability throughout. Skift, the travel industry publication, covered Civitatis that same year and described how the company had found its niche by focusing on Spanish-speaking travellers, a segment largely overlooked by larger competitors.

== Rappi partnership ==
In November 2024, Civitatis announced a partnership with Rappi, the Latin American super-app, to launch a tours and activities vertical within Rappi Travel. The deal gave Civitatis access to Rappi's more than 22 million active users across seven countries: Argentina, Mexico, Colombia, Peru, Chile, Brazil and Uruguay. PhocusWire covered the partnership independently, noting it was part of Civitatis's broader push to consolidate its position in Latin America, where it had already held the top sales position for years.

== B2B channel ==
Civitatis launched its B2B sales team in 2018, targeting travel agencies as a distribution channel. By early 2024, agency sales accounted for 33 percent of overall sales volume, driven by partnerships with nearly all the major Spanish travel agency groups. By the end of 2024 the platform had over 30,000 travel agency partners worldwide, with Mexico and Italy leading growth in that channel. Travolution covered the B2B milestone independently, noting the rapid growth since the channel launched just six years earlier.

== Recognition ==
In November 2023 Civitatis won the Spanish Pyme Expansion and Ifema Award, recognising its growth since founding. CB Insights named Civitatis an Outperformer in its tour and activity booking platforms analysis, alongside companies including Airbnb, Expedia and Klook. The company also participated in FITUR in Spain, IFTM in France, TTG in Italy and WTM in Brazil as part of its international expansion strategy.

== Leadership change ==
In December 2025, Gutiérrez announced he was stepping down as CEO after 18 years running the company. His successor was Andrés Spitzer, the company's Chief Product and Technology Officer, who took over on 1 January 2026. Spitzer brought previous experience at Amazon, Europcar and Ubeeqo. Gutiérrez remained on the board of directors. PhocusWire reported the transition and quoted Gutiérrez describing Civitatis as "a rare gem in the tech world, profitable, growing and beloved by customers and partners alike."

On 22 January 2026, shortly after stepping down as CEO, Gutiérrez became the fourth Spanish citizen to travel to space, flying aboard Blue Origin's NS-38 mission from Launch Site One in West Texas. Spanish media including Diario de Valladolid and El Español covered the flight extensively. Gutiérrez described the experience as "a spectacular fairground ride" and said the most striking moments were the infinite blackness of space and the G-forces on re-entry.

== Business model ==
Civitatis operates as a B2B2C marketplace, connecting travellers with over 6,500 local tour operators and suppliers worldwide. Content is available primarily in Spanish, Portuguese, English, Italian and French, reflecting its focus on the 750 million Spanish and Portuguese speakers worldwide. The company also runs a separate B2B channel for travel agencies.

By 2022 the company had reached revenues of 200 million euros. In 2023 it served 10 million customers, growing 66 percent year on year. In 2024 that figure rose to 15 million, with activities rated an average of 9.1 out of 10 by users.
