= Banco Davivienda Honduras =

Honduran bank

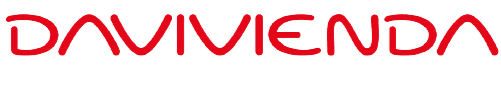

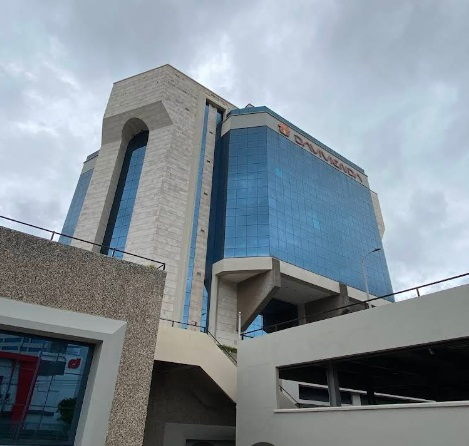
- Headquarters of the Bank
- Type: Subsidiary
- Industry: Financial services
- Founded: 2012
- Headquarters: Tegucigalpa, Honduras
- Number of locations: 49 (2025)
- Area served: Honduras
- Key people: Gustavo Raudales (CEO)
- Total assets: USD 2,44 billion (2025)
- Number of employees: 1269 (2025)
- Parent: Davivienda
- Website: www.davivienda.com.hn

Banco Davivienda Honduras, is a major Honduran bank and subsidiary of Colombian bank Davivienda, It has a network of approximately 46 branches and serves almost half million customers nationwide.

== History ==
The oldest corporate branch of what is today Davivienda Honduras began on January 17, 1917, with the founding of El Ahorro Hondureño, Compañía Centroamericana de Seguros y Caja de Ahorros. It was the first insurance company in Honduras and the second in Central America. Because banking regulations were virtually non-existent at the time, El Ahorro Hondureño naturally began operating commercial savings programs. In 1969, transitioned into a commercial bank under the name Banco la Capitalizadora Hondureña S.A. (BANCAHSA).

In 2000, a massive consolidation milestone, sister banks BANCAHSA and Bancahorro merged to form Banco Grupo El Ahorro Hondureño, S.A. (known widely as Banco BGA),

In 2002, Seeking regional scaling, the majority shareholders of BGA sold the financial group to Panama-based Grupo Banistmo, the largest financial group in Central America at the time. The bank kept the BGA brand but integrated regional tech.

In 2006, Global banking giant HSBC bought Grupo Banistmo for $1.77 billion. By 2007, the old BGA offices across Honduras were rebranded with the red-and-white HSBC hexagon, turning the operation into a global subsidiary.

In January 2012, Davivienda purchased the Costa Rica, El Salvador, and Honduras operations of HSBC for roughly US$ 801 million.

In 2023, the parent company established Holding Davivienda Internacional. based in Panama to structurally unite and manage its Central American subsidiaries (Costa Rica, El Salvador, and Honduras).

== See also ==
- Banking in Honduras
