= Alberto Vallarino Clément =

Panamanian engineer and businessman (born 1951)

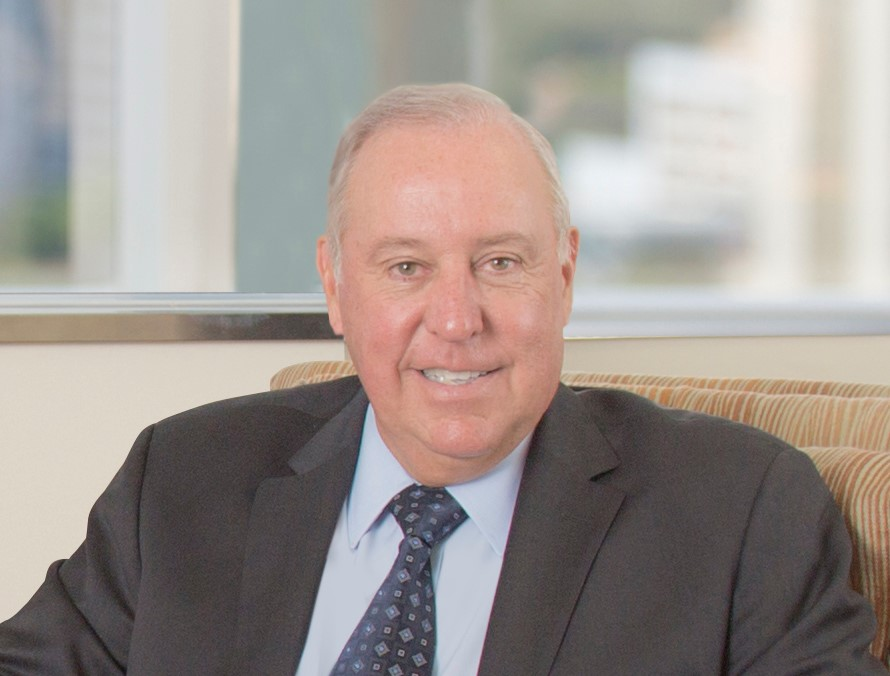
- Alberto Vallarino, CEO Grupo VerdeAzul, S.A.
- Born: April 2, 1951; Panama City
- Education: Cornell University
- Occupations: CEo of grupo verdeazul, s.a
- Website: www.grupoverdeazul.com

Alberto Vallarino Clément, (Panama City, April 2, 1951) is a Panamanian engineer, businessman and president of Grupo VerdeAzul, S.A. since 2011.

== Biography ==
Alberto Vallarino Clément was born in Panama City on April 2, 1951. He is the son of Mr. Alberto Vallarino Céspedes and Mrs. Marta Stella Clément Linares. His great-grandfather Enrique Linares served as president twice and was one of the signers of the Declaration of Independence of the Republic. Another grandfather, Carlos Clément, was one of the heroes of the Independence in Colón.

On July 24, 1981, Vallarino married Adriana Lewis Morgan, daughter of Samuel Lewis Galindo and Itza Morgan de Lewis. They have three children: Ana Maria, Diego and Ximena.

== Studies ==
In 1968, he obtained his diploma of Bachelor of Science from Colegio La Salle, with first place of honor of his class. In 1973 he graduated in Industrial Engineering from Cornell University, where he also earned a master's degree in business administration in 1974.

== Work experience ==
Alberto Vallarino began his career in 1974 at Citibank, N.A. Later he worked as general manager of Industria Nacional de Plásticos, S.A. (1975–1988) and Executive Vice President of Metalforma, S.A. (1979–1988). In 1988, he was appointed Executive Vice President of Banco del Istmo and its subsidiaries.

He also served as CEO of Grupo Banistmo for 20 years, until its sale in 2007 to the HSBC group.

In 1999, Alberto Vallarino founded the Buenaventura Tourism Development.

In addition, Vallarino was member of the board of directors of several companies: Cable & Wireless Communications Panama, S.A., Caja de Seguro Social (Social Security), Banco Nacional de Panamá and Empresa de Transmisión Eléctrica S.A. (Electric Transmission Company).

On February 19, 2013, he was appointed as a member of the board of directors of the Panama Canal Authority for a period of nine years.

Since 2011, Alberto Vallarino has been the CEO of Grupo Verdeazul, S.A.

== Political career ==
In 1984 he was General Sub Coordinator of the presidential campaign of Arnulfo Arias. Meanwhile, during 1989 he participated from corporate associations in the Cruzada Civilista (Civil Crusade) to overthrow the military dictatorship.

For the elections of May 2, 1999, Vallarino was the presidential candidate for Acción Oppositora, which emerged from the alliance of four opposition groups, including Partido Demócrata Cristiano.

Between 2009 and 2011, Alberto Vallarino served as Minister of Economy and Finance of Panama in the government of former President Ricardo Martinelli.

During his tenure as head of the ministry, Panama won in 2010 the award of Investment Grade of three risk rating agencies, over a period of time of 90 days: on March Fitch Ratings upgraded the qualification of Panama, allowing the nation to achieve the Investment Grade Category for the first time; on May Standard & Poor's Ratings Services also upgraded Panama's rating to Investment Grade, due to the prospects of moderate deficit and the expectations of economic growth; meanwhile, on June Moody's awarded Panama with the Investment Grade, due to the "significant improvement" in the country's fiscal policies and a solid economic growth.

Also, during Alberto Vallarino's period as minister, Panama managed to be excluded from the list of tax havens by the Organisation for Economic Co-operation and Development (OECD) in July 2011, as well as being removed from "the list of countries which identified Panama as an uncooperative tax haven, as is the case of Mexico, France, Italy and others", in the words of Vallarino.

== Philanthropic work ==
Alberto Vallarino served as president of the Unión de Trabajo Industrial de Panamá (1981–1982), Asociación de Industriales Latinoamericanos (1982) and Asociación de Exportadores Panameños (1983); besides being founder and life member of Instituto de Competitividad Infantil de COSPAE; member of Fundación para el Desarrollo Económico y Social de Panamá (Fudespa) and the National Centre of Competitiveness; and president of Fundación Por Un Mejor Panamá.

Also, he constituted Fundación Vallarino Clément, to promote programs and projects related to education, economy and culture.

While he was part of Banistmo, Vallarino established and directed Valores del Istmo, the corporate social responsibility arm of the bank. Then he took that same philosophy to Grupo VerdeAzul, S.A. in 2007, through Fundación Por Un Mejor Panamá.
