= HSBC Bank Panama =

Bank of Panama

HSBC Panamá
- Company type: Subsidiary of HSBC Holdings plc
- Industry: Finance and Insurance
- Defunct: 2013
- Fate: Become Banistmo
- Headquarters: Panama City, Panama
- Key people: Guillermo Savignano, CEO
- Products: Financial services
- Website: hsbc.com.pa at the Wayback Machine (archived 2012-08-31))

HSBC Bank (Panama) S.A. was a subsidiary of HSBC Holdings plc headquartered in Panama City, Panama. The bank provides Personal banking, Corporate banking and Treasury services to Panama. In 2013 Bancolombia Group acquired HSBC Panama and renamed it as Banistmo.

== History ==
The HSBC Group operated in Panama since 1972, when The Hongkong and Shanghai Banking Corporation opened the representative office in Panama City that year. Approval to operate as a licensed banking institution in Panama City was granted in 1973 and in the Colón Free Trade Zone in 1993.

HSBC Panama was incorporated on 1999, consistent with the HSBC Group's strategy of creating the global brand, HSBC. In 2000, HSBC acquired the banking operations of Chase Manhattan Bank in Panama. In 2005, HSBC acquired the group of companies trading under the brand name Financomer, which entered the personal lending market in Panama in 1986.

In November 2006, HSBC acquired Grupo Banistmo, the leading banking group in Central America and gave HSBC access to new markets, with offices in Colombia, Costa Rica, El Salvador, Honduras and Nicaragua. The merger of HSBC Panama and Grupo Banistmo was successfully completed in 2007. But the subsidiary of Grupo Banistmo, Primer Banco del Istmo, was retained until it merged into HSBC Panama in 2009.

In 2012, HSBC Holdings plc faced significant challenges due to flawed anti-money laundering controls, resulting in a $1.9 billion fine.

In February 2013, HSBC announced the sale of its Panama operations to Bancolombia for $2.1 billion. The purchase included HSBC Bank (Panama) S.A., Financomer S.A., HSBC Seguros Panamá S.A. and HSBC Securities Panamá S.A.. This strategic move was part of HSBC’s broader plan to streamline its operations and reduce its presence in Latin America. The transaction was completed in October 2013, with HSBC Panama rebranding as Banistmo.

At the time of the rebranding to Banistmo, HSBC Panama was the second largest bank in Panama in terms of market share in loans and customer deposits. It had more than 2,300 employees, 420,000 clients, 57 branches and 264 ATMs.

== See also ==
- Primer Banco del Istmo
- List of banks in Panama
