= Balboa Bank and Trust =

Bank of Panama

Balboa Bank & Trust S.A.
- Founded: 2003
- Type: Private
- Location: Edificio Balboa Bank & Trust, Calle 50 y Calle Beatriz María Cabal. Ciudad de Panamá, República de Panamá
- President: Ramón Fernández Quijano
- Key people: Ramón Martínez Stagg (CEO)
- Affiliations: BalboaTrader
- Website: balboabanktrust.com

Balboa Bank & Trust is a financial institution based in the Banking Center of the Republic of Panama. It is a subsidiary of Strategic Investors Group, Inc., a company registered under the laws of the Republic of Panama. The bank offers savings accounts, checking accounts, time deposits, money market accounts, debit cards, trust services, credit cards, and MasterCard cards.

== History ==
Balboa Bank & Trust, Corporation was incorporated on December 23, 2002, under the laws of the Republic of Panama, under public deed No.8299, as Stanford Bank (Panama), S. A. On April 1, 2005, the Superintendence of Banks of Panama granted the bank a General Banking License under Resolution SB.No.033-2005. In March 2010, full control of shares of the bank was ceded to Strategic Investors Group, Inc, and on April 21, 2010, the Superintendence of Banks of Panama authorized the change of the bank's legal name to Balboa Bank & Trust Corp.

Balboa Bank & Trust Corp. started business on May 31, 2012. In October 2012, the Parent Company acquired 100% of the shares of Banco Transatlántico S.A. The two banks were merged on December 28, 2012, with Balboa Bank & Trust, Corp. remaining the surviving entity.

Russian born Vladimir Antonov and his partner Raimondas Baranauskas were accused of asset stripping at Lithuanian bank Snoras. “Both men were arrested in London on November 23, and charged in connection with a Lithuanian extradition warrant. What constitutes money laundering - The two were subsequently released on bail. The arrest warrant lists the two as suspects in regard to alleged fraudulent accounting, forgery of documents, abuse of authority, misappropriation of property, money laundering and other criminal offenses committed by the bank Snoras. Forensic auditors are reported to have found more than $1.4 billion missing. Federal anti-money laundering regulations - The government of Lithuania has also expressed an interest in seizing their assets, both in Lithuania and abroad. Last year, WIPC secured a license from the Dominica (Commonwealth of Dominica, W.I.) government to engage in geothermal drilling on the island. Money laundering structuring - The company has also been accused of paying bribes to the Dominican (Commonwealth of Dominica, W.I.) government in exchange for securing the license. Antonov, 36 who up until Monday was the owner of British football club Portsmouth also had a controlling stake in the Dominican Bank Banco Transatlantico. UK anti money laundering - The offshore bank formerly called Griffon bank is housed at the government Headquarters in Roseau, Dominica, and also has a sister branch in Panama Banco Transatlantico S.A”, which was apparently acquired in 2012 by Balboa Bank and Trust.

Based on Article 131 of Panamanian Banking Law, on May 5, 2016, the Superintendence of Banks of Panama orders the seizure of administrative and operating control of Balboa Bank & Trust Corp. effective the same day.

This decision was adopted as the result of the actions taken by the United States Department of the Treasury's Office of Foreign Assets Control (OFAC) against the so-called “Waked Economic Group” due to Mr. Nidal Waked is one member of the board of directors.

== Overview ==
The Executive Board of the group is composed of

- Ramón Fernández Quijano as president
- Arturo del Valle Cueto as vice president
- Julianne Cannavaggio as secretary
- Dennis T. Lindo as treasurer
- Guillermo Romagosa as director,
- Nidal Waked as director
- Roberto Roy Ortega as director
- Ricardo Fábrega as director
- Jaime de Gamboa as external director
- Alberto Villageliú as external director
- Antonio del Valle as alternate director
- Ramón Fernández Morales as alternate director

With the acquisition and merger with Banco Transatlántico, the Balboa Bank & Trust increased its balance from $120 million (USD) in 2011 to $424 million (USD) in 2012, closing the year with a credit portfolio of $250 million (USD) and client deposits of $375 million (USD). Additionally, its capital base increased from $14.5 million (USD) in 2011 to $34.6 million (USD) in 2012, according to the report on its financial state.

== Services ==
In addition to general services provided by any bank Balboa Bank & Trust provides loans, such as commercial loans, credit lines, commercial mortgage loans, overdrafts, letters of credit, interim construction loans, surety bonds, heavy equipment loans, and warranties and promise letters. The company was founded in 2003 and is based in Panama City, Panama. As of March 2010, Balboa Bank & Trust Corp. operates as a subsidiary of Strategic Investors Group, Inc.
