= Banco Davivienda Costa Rica =

Costa Rican Bank

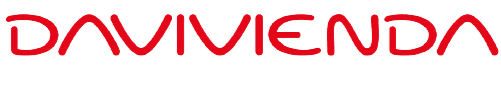

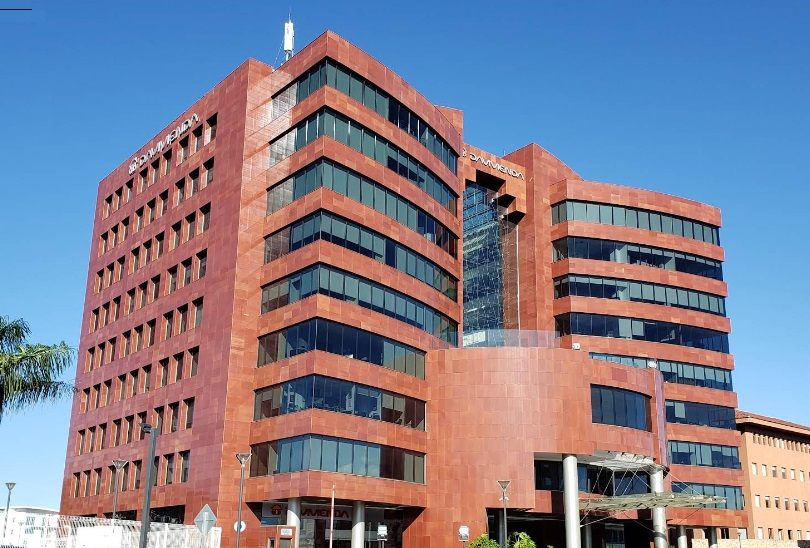
- Headquartes of the bank
- Formerly: HSBC Bank Costa Rica
- Type: Subsidiary
- Traded as: BVN: BDAVI
- Industry: Financial services
- Founded: 2012
- Headquarters: San José, Costa Rica
- Number of locations: 70 (2025)
- Area served: Costa Rica
- Key people: Arturo Giacomin (CEO); Rodolfo Herrera (CEO of DaviBank)
- Revenue: CRC 71,9 billions (2025) (USD 158 millions)
- Operating income: CRC 150 billions (2025) (USD 332 millions)
- Total assets: CRC 8,58 trillions (2025) (USD 4,69 billions)
- Total equity: CRC 267 billions (2025) (USD 588 millions)
- Number of employees: 2733 (2025)
- Parent: Davivienda
- Website: davivienda.cr

Banco Davivienda Costa Rica is a major Costa Rican bank. It is a subsidiary of the Colombian bank Davivienda. It operates as a universal bank, stockbroker, and insurance agency.

== History ==
In January 2012, Davivienda purchased the Costa Rica, El Salvador, and Honduras operations of HSBC for roughly US$801 million (with the Costa Rican operation alone valued at approximately US$300 million).

In 2023, the parent company established Holding Davivienda Internacional, based in Panama, to structurally unite and manage its Central American subsidiaries (Costa Rica, El Salvador, and Honduras).

On January 6, 2025, Scotiabank and Davivienda announced a merger agreement through which Scotiabank would own 20% of Davivienda, and the latter would absorb Scotiabank Colpatria (Colombia), Scotiabank Panama, and Scotiabank Costa Rica. These operations would be subject to regulatory approvals throughout 2025. During the integration, Davivienda would operate its subsidiary and Davibank in parallel.

== See also ==
- List of largest banks in Latin America
