= Juan Pablo Ortega =

Colombian entrepreneur

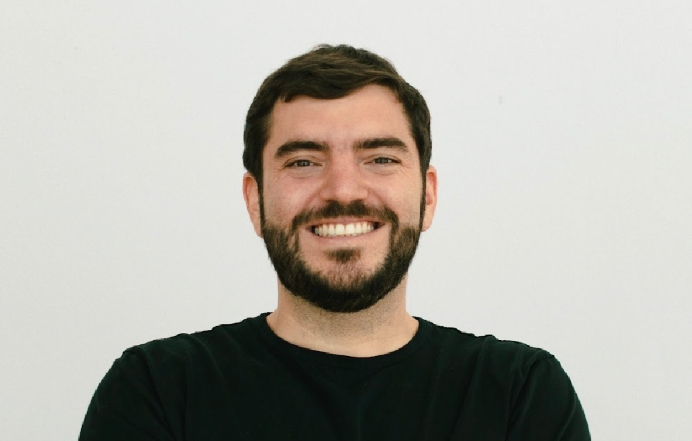
- Education: Cornell University
- Occupations: Entrepreneur, business executive
- Known for: Co-founder of Rappi

Juan Pablo Ortega is a Colombian-American entrepreneur and business executive. He is the co-founder Rappi, a Latin American on-demand delivery platform.

== Early life and career ==
Ortega studied Applied Economics and Management at Cornell University.

In 2015, Ortega co-founded Rappi, an on-demand delivery platform based in Bogotá, Colombia. Rappi subsequently expanded across Latin America.

In 2022, Ortega co-founded Yuno with Julián Núñez. Yuno is a payment orchestration platform that provides businesses with a single integration to access multiple payment providers and methods across different markets.

As of 2025, Yuno operates in more than 140 countries. Its clients include McDonald's, Rappi, Avianca, and inDrive.
