= Torre Cuscatlán =

Coordinates: 13°42′30.73″N 89°14′27.56″W

Tower Cuscatlán
- Tower Democracy
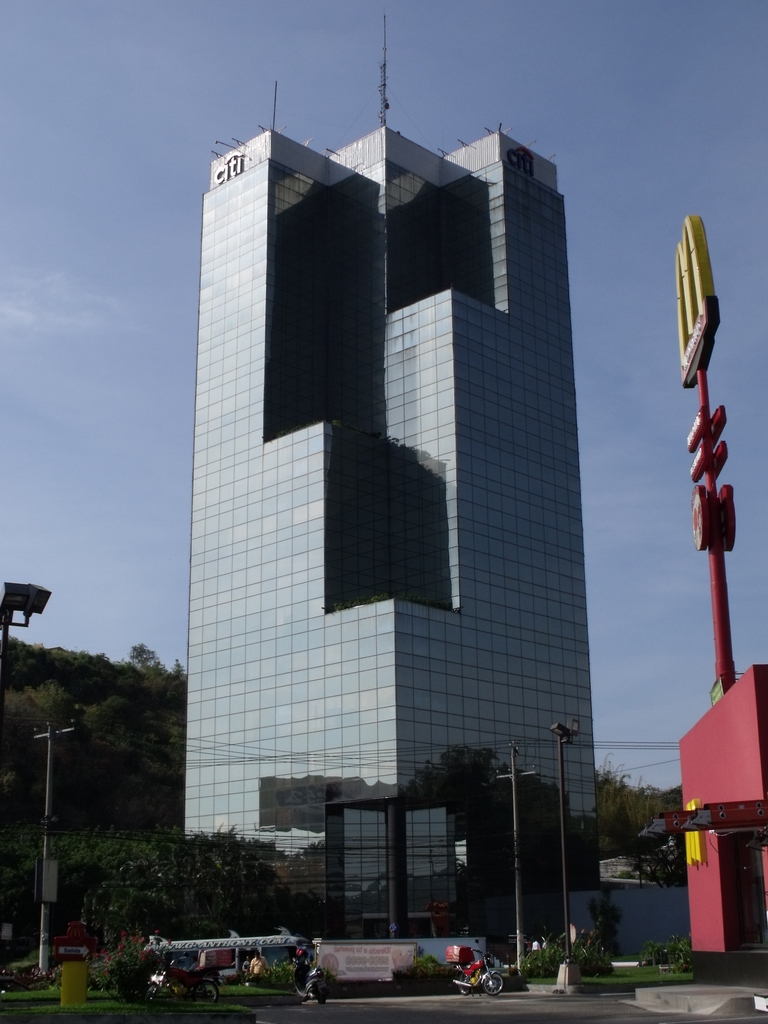
- Torre Cuscatlán in 2010
- Interactive map of the Tower Cuscatlán area
- Former names: Tower Democracy (1989-1998); Tower Citi (2007-2016)
- Alternative names: Torre Citi

General information
- Status: Completed
- Location: Avenida Albert Einstein Antiguo Cuscatlán; El Salvador
- Construction started: 1988
- Completed: 1989
- Cost: 10 million SVC (US$1.14 million)
- Owner: Bank Cuscatlán
- Operator: Bank Cuscatlán

Height
- Roof: 79 m (259 ft)

Technical details
- Floor count: 19
- Lifts/elevators: 3

Design and construction
- Architect: Ricardo Jiménez Castillo
- Structural engineer: Fredy Herrera Coello
- Main contractor: Bolivar Group

Torre Cuscatlán (Cuscatlán Tower in English; formerly known as Torre Democracia or Tower of Democracy) is an office building and is one of the tallest buildings in El Salvador located in Antiguo Cuscatlán. Finished in 1989, it is 79 meters high and has 19 floors. Ricardo Jiménez Castillo, who is considered one of the most representative architects of El Salvador, was in charge of the building's design. It is influenced by modern style, using a complete glass cladding for the exterior. The main characteristic of its design is the 3 setbacks covered with plants that run along with the height of the building. The materials used to construct the tower were aluminum, reinforced concrete, and glass. The building was the tallest in El Salvador from 1989 to 2009 when the Torre Cuscatlán lost the title to the Tower Pedregal. As of 2022, It is currently the 3rd tallest building in El Salvador.

== History ==
Construction for the tower began in 1988 during the presidency of José Napoleón Duarte and costed around 10 million colónes. Construction finished in 1989 along with the opening of the building. During the Salvadoran Civil War, the guerrilla group known as FMLN tried to topple it multiple times, although was unsuccessful in doing so and only achieved shattering most of the glass-covered surface. The tower was named Torre Democracia until 1998 when the building was sold to Bank Cuscátlan and was renamed Torre Cuscatlán until July 2007 when Bank Cuscatlán was bought by Citibank was then renamed Torre Citibank El Salvador. In 2016, it was once again called Torre Cuscatlán, when the name of Bank Cuscatlán was renamed in the hands of Grupo Terra, a Honduran group. Financial Investments Imperia Cuscatlán, which is a subsidiary of Grupo Terra, was responsible for the acquisition of Citigroup shares.
