= Rappi =

Colombian delivery company

- Type: Private
- Industry: Online food ordering; E-commerce; Financial technology
- Founded: 2015; 11 years ago
- Founders: Simón Borrero; Felipe Villamarín; Sebastián Mejía; Juan Pablo Ortega
- Headquarters: Bogotá, Colombia
- Area served: Colombia; Argentina; Brazil; Chile; Costa Rica; Austria; Germany; Luxembourg; Switzerland; Mexico; Peru; Uruguay
- Products: Mobile app
- Services: Food delivery; Grocery delivery; Mobile payment; Online shopping; Online travel agency
- Revenue: ▲US$800 million (2023)
- Number of employees: 5,200 employees (2024); 350,000 couriers (2024)
- Website: rappi.com

Rappi is a Colombian super-app headquartered in Bogotá, Colombia, with offices in São Paulo and Mexico City. It was founded in 2015.

== History ==
Rappi was founded in 2015 in Bogotá, Colombia by three Colombian entrepreneurs: Simón Borrero, Felipe Villamarín, and Sebastián Mejía.

Rappi entered Y Combinator's Winter 2016 batch, generating additional investment. In August 2018, the company raised another $200 million in funding. SoftBank became a major stakeholder in Rappi in April 2019 with a $USD1 billion investment that valued Rappi at $3.5 billion.

In January 2019, Borrero, Villamarín, and Mejía were listed as part of Bloomberg's 50 Most Influential people and Rappi was highlighted as a company that is “transforming Latin America”. In April 2024, Tiago Azevedo was hired as chief financial officer of Rappi.

In February 2019, Simón Borrero was awarded the "Empresario del año" (Businessman of the year) award from the Colombian President. Simón Borrero and Rappi are currently being sued in U.S. federal court for misappropriation of trade secrets.

In June 2020, and during the peak of the COVID-19 pandemic in Latin American countries, Rappi announced in a live event for the creation of 3 additional divisions in this category such as games, live sales and music simultaneously in 9 countries. With this announcement Rappi consolidated its goal of becoming the first app on the continent by expanding its offerings to compete with other entertainment giants such as Spotify.

As of August 2020, Rappi had more than 200,000 independent couriers actively connecting to the app in Latin America. Rappi also worked with over 250,000 different businesses including groceries shops, pharmacies, kiosks, and office supply stores.

In 2021, Rappi was valued at $5.25 billion following their $COP500 million Series F financing round. By the summer of 2021, it is announced that Rappi raises its valuation to US $5.2 billion after closing the most recent Series G investment round at that time and raising US $500 million. Participants in the round included T. Rowe Price, Baillie Gifford, Third Point, Octahedron, GIC SoftBank, DST Global, Y Combinator, Andreessen Horowitz and Sequoia Capital.

Rappi announced acquisition of AI company Fountain9 in September 2024 to enhance AI operations. Rappi was also included in the Time magazine's list of influential companies in 2024.

== Rappi Pay/Bank ==
In March 2019, Rappi partnered with Visa to offer prepaid cards in Mexico after the acquisition of the Mexican startup Payit, Colombia and Brazil, together with a QR-Code based digital wallet called RappiPay. In Colombia, they reached an alliance with Davivienda as well. Rappi's Country Manager in Brazil said it was the first of many financial services the company planned to expand beyond delivery.

In 2021, RappiBank was launched in Mexico as a fintech solution made after an alliance with Banorte, providing digital financial services.

In 2022, Rappi got approval to become a bank in Colombia. BNN Bloomberg reports that RappiBank has 300,000 Savings Account customers. Rappi offers working capital credit lines to restaurant owners and merchants it partners with. In Colombia, RappiPay has around 750,000 users, distributed more than 120,000 credit cards, and made an alliance with Davivienda.

In 2022, as part of the portfolio of Financial Services, Rappi announced the launching of payments using Crypto.

=== IPO ===
Rappi co-founder Simón Borrero said in September 2024 that the company would be IPO-ready in about a year.

== Controversies ==
=== Legal trouble ===
In September 2019, Rappi CEO and co-founder Simón Borrero has been accused of stealing the company Uribe's "idea for the creation of a platform that allowed users to contact other people willing to run errands." The Colombian Superintendency of Industry and Commerce has ordered the company to comply with electronic commerce regulations; however it allegedly still operates outside these regulations. The company currently has 108 active lawsuits related to consumer protection lodged against it. In January, the company started to charge delivery drivers a fee to use the app.

The Colombian Superintendency of Industry and Commerce is currently claiming that plaintiff Rappi is "Not having a complaints channel for their customers, the fact that there is still confusion in the terms and conditions ... the final price for the consumer still being unknown and variable, the fact they are still not giving full attention to the complaints ... calls our attention," Superintendency head Andres Barreto told journalists.

Along with a myriad of predatory employment policies, it has been discovered Rappi intended to force employees to compete for access to COVID-19 vaccinations.

=== Work conditions ===
In October 2018, some delivery couriers of Rappi took to the streets. The company has been criticized for its working conditions, from the employee side and for a lack of customer care from their customer service. Rappi has allegedly failed to follow regulations regarding customer support and faces possible fines from government regulators.

== See also ==
- Visa
- Davivienda
- Banorte
- MercadoLibre
- List of companies of Colombia
