= Banistmo =

Panamian bank

Banistmo S.A.

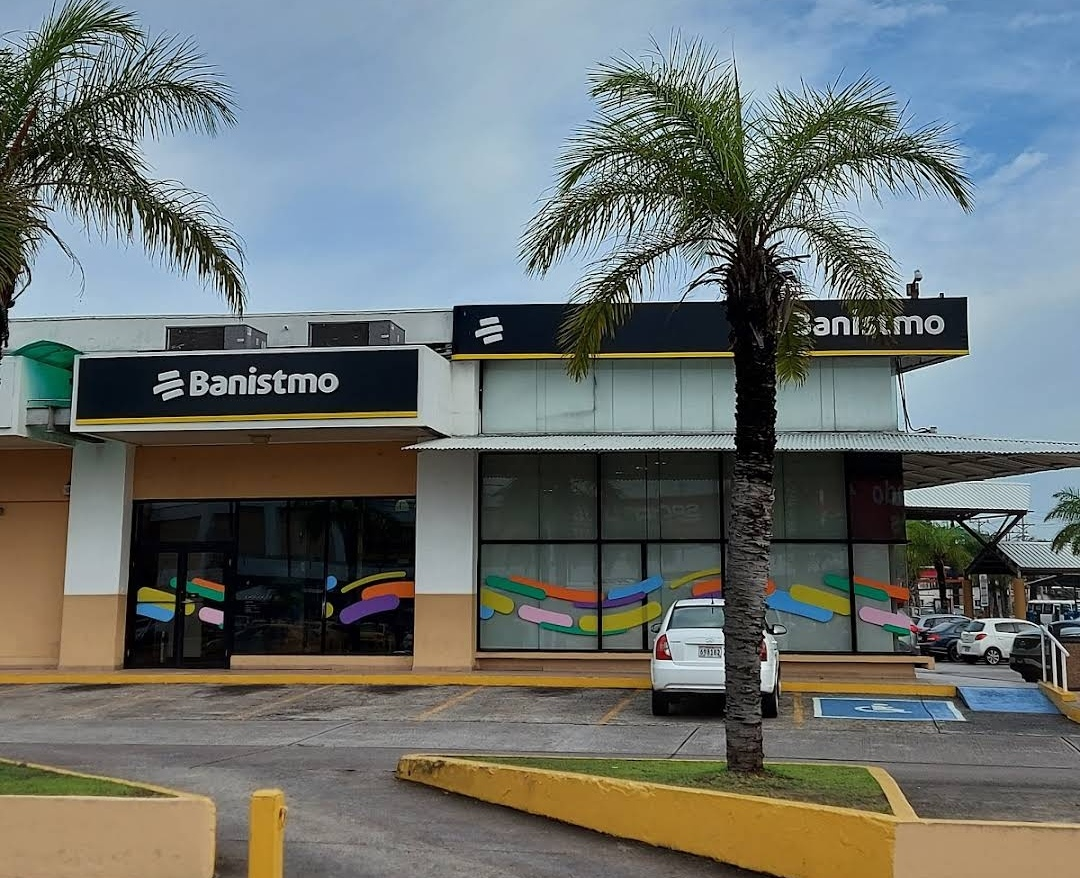
- Industry: Banking
- Predecessor: Banistmo (1984-2009); HSBC Bank Panama (2009-2013)
- Founded: 1984
- Headquarters: Panama City, Panama City
- Products: First Direct
- Parent: Bancolombia
- Website: banistmo.com

Banistmo is the largest bank in Panama and Central America. It was founded in 1984 as Primer Banco del Istmo before it became part of the HSBC Group following its former parent company, Grupo Banistmo's acquisition by HSBC in November 2006. It was the subsidiary of HSBC Bank (Panama) S.A. until it merged into HSBC Bank (Panama) in 2009. In 2013 Bancolombia Group acquired HSBC Panama and renamed it as Banistmo.

Former Banistmo logo used between 1984 and 2009

In the mid-2020s, Banistmo operated as a locally licensed Panamanian bank within Grupo Cibest, the holding company of Bancolombia, participating in regional financial markets through corporate bond issuances and sustainable finance initiatives.

In December 2025, Grupo Cibest announced an agreement to sell 100% of Banistmo shares to Inversiones Cuscatlán Centroamérica S.A., with an agreed sale price of approximately US$1.4 billion, subject to regulatory approval in Panama.

== Operations ==
By the mid-2020s, Banistmo operated in Panama as a locally licensed bank within Grupo Cibest, the holding company of Bancolombia. Grupo Cibest maintained a regional presence through affiliated financial entities in Colombia, Guatemala, El Salvador, Puerto Rico and the United States.

== Sustainable finance ==
In September 2025, Banistmo issued sustainable bonds in Panama’s domestic capital market for a total of US$100 million with a five-year maturity, becoming the first financial institution in the country to complete such an issuance. The bond proceeds were allocated to green and social projects, including renewable energy, sustainable construction, energy efficiency, clean mobility and circular economy initiatives, and aimed to expand access to financing for small and medium-sized enterprises led by women.

BID Invest acted as an anchor investor in the transaction, subscribing US$75 million of the offering.

== Sale to Inversiones Cuscatlán ==
In December 2025, Grupo Cibest announced an agreement to sell 100% of Banistmo’s shares to Inversiones Cuscatlán Centroamérica S.A. The sale included all subsidiaries of Banistmo, such as Leasing Banistmo and Banistmo Investment Corporation S.A.

Financial media reported the agreed sale price at approximately US$1.4 billion, with Bloomberg Línea citing US$1.428 billion and La República reporting US$1.418 billion.

The agreement remained subject to regulatory approval in Panama, and Grupo Cibest stated it would continue to operate Banistmo and serve its clients and employees during the transition.

Bloomberg Línea reported that JPMorgan acted as financial adviser and Sullivan & Cromwell provided legal counsel for the transaction.

Grupo Cibest characterised the divestment as part of a broader portfolio optimisation strategy focused on capital allocation and value creation in the Latin American region.

== Financial and accounting impact ==
The sale of Banistmo had a significant accounting impact on Grupo Cibest’s 2025 financial results, as the bank was reclassified as an “asset held for sale” and a discontinued operation under IFRS 5.

As a result, Grupo Cibest recognised a non-cash goodwill impairment charge of approximately COP 3.4 trillion, which materially distorted quarterly and annual reported results, although executives stated that the impairment did not involve cash outflows or impact regulatory capital ratios.

Despite the accounting effect, Grupo Cibest reported consolidated net income attributable to shareholders of COP 3.82 trillion for 2025.

== See also ==
- HSBC Mexico
- HSBC Bank (Panama)
- Alberto Vallarino Clement
- List of banks in Panama
