= National Bank of Panama =

Central bank of Panama

Coordinates: 8.9878°N 79.5269°W

National Bank of Panama Banco Nacional de Panamá

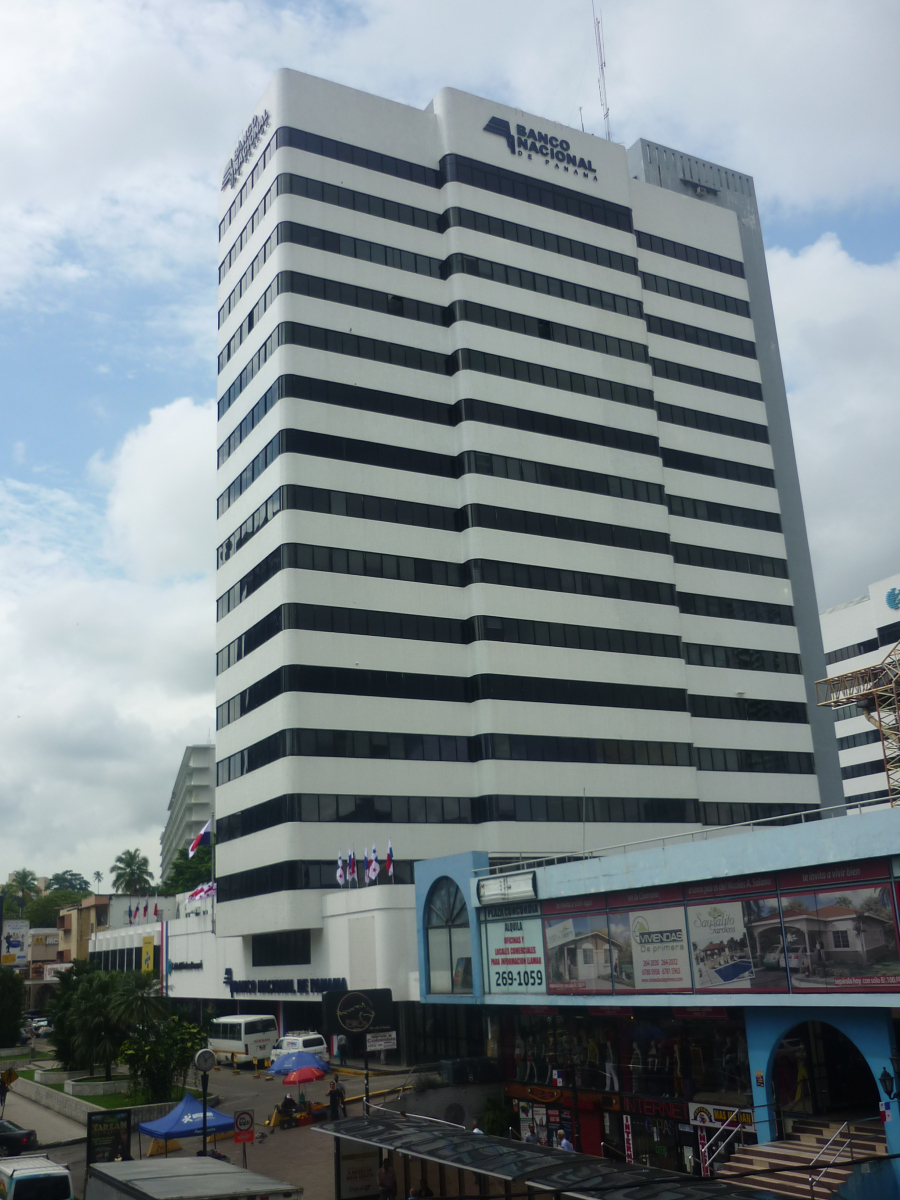
- Central bank of: Panama
- Established: 1911
- President of directive junta: Lizbeth Ann Henríquez Leonard
- Currency: Panamanian balboa
- Website: www.banconal.com.pa

The National Bank of Panama (Spanish: Banco Nacional de Panamá, BNP) is one of two Panamanian government-owned banks. As of January 2009, it held deposits of about US$5 billion. The other government-owned bank is Caja de Ahorros de Panamá (Savings Bank of Panama), with about US$1 billion in total deposits.

Panama has never had an official central bank. The National Bank of Panama was responsible for nonmonetary aspects of central banking in Panama, assisted by the National Banking Commission (Superintendencia del Mercado de Valores), which was created along with the country's International Financial Center, and was charged with licensing and supervising banks.

== General managers - Gerentes generales ==
- Albino H. Arosemena, 1904-1909
- Rodolfo Chiari, 1909-1914
- Francisco Mata Arosemena, 1914
- Ramón Felipe Acevedo, 1914-1916
- José Agustin Arango Ch., 1916-1924
- Próspero Pinel, 1924-1926
- Tomás Gabriel Duque, 1926
- Enrique Linares, 1926-1932
- Eduardo de Alba, 1932-1954
- Florencio de Ycaza, 1954
- Henrique de Obarrio, 1954-1960
- René Orillac Arango, 1960-1964
- Jorge T. Velásquez, 1964-1967
- Fernando Díaz González, 1967-1969
- Eduardo McCullough, 1969
- Enrique Jamarillo Jr., 1969-1970
- Ricardo de la Espriella, 1970 - 1978
- Luis Alberto Arias, 1978 - July 1987
- Rafael Arosemena, July 1987 - ?
- Jose B. Espino, ? - 1988 - ?
- Luis H. Moreno, 1989 - 1994
- José Antonio de la Ossa, September 1994 - May 1998
- Eduardo C. Urriola R., 1998 - 1999
- Bolívar Pariente Castillero, September 1999 - September 2004
- Juan Ricardo De Dianous, September 2004 - June 2009
- Darío Ernesto Berbey De La Rosa, July 2009 - June 2014
- Rolando de León de Alba, July 2014 - July 2019
- Javier Carrizo Esquivel, July 2019 -

== See also ==
- Economy of Panama
- Panamanian balboa
- List of banks in Panama
