= Davivienda =

Colombian bank

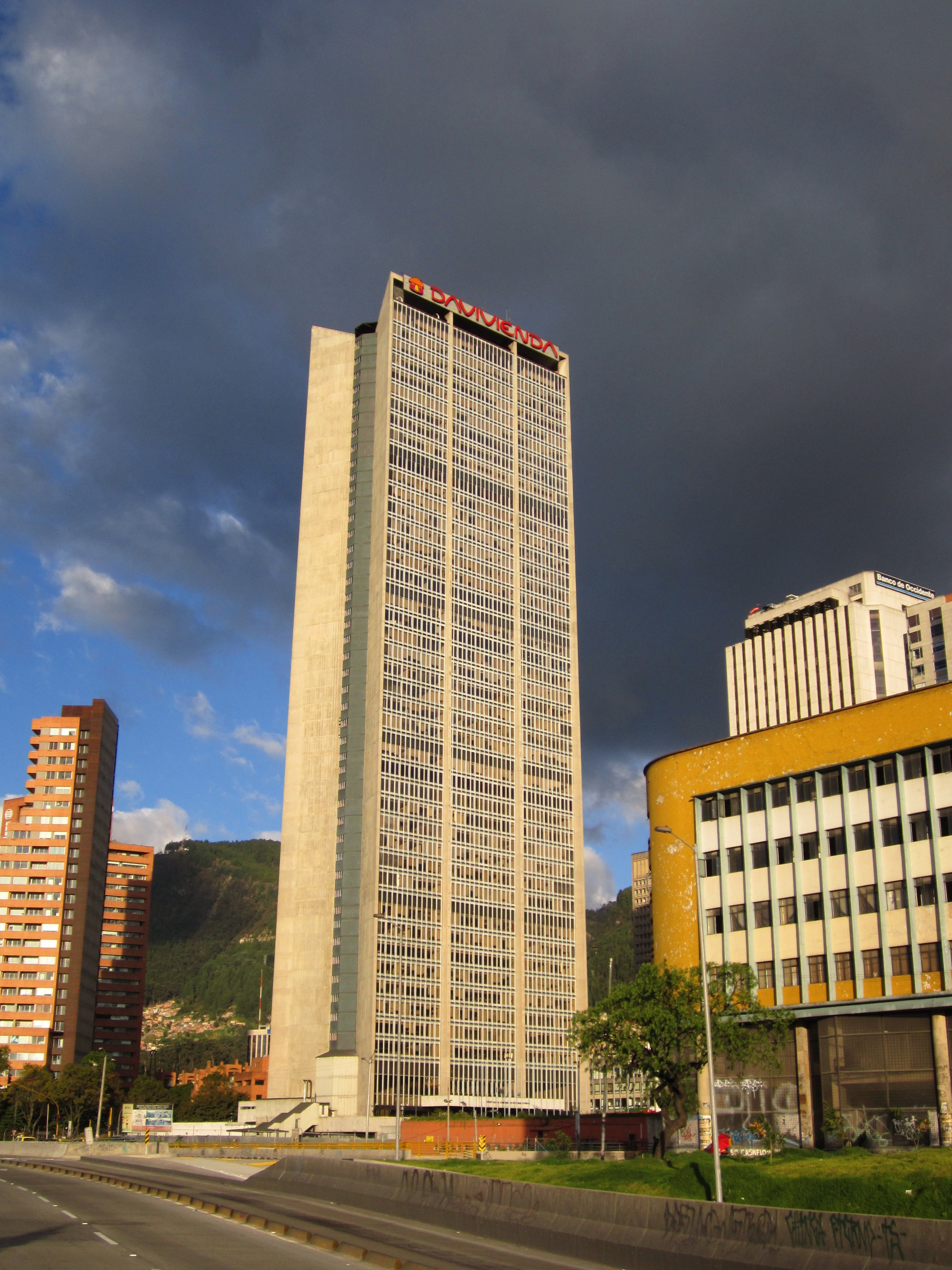
- Davivienda’s Headquarters “Centro de Comercio Internacional” in Bogotá.
- Type: Sociedad Anónima
- Traded as: BVC: PFDAVVNDA
- ISIN: COT11PA00041
- Industry: Finance
- Founded: August 1, 1972; 54 years ago
- Headquarters: Bogotá, Colombia
- Number of locations: 509 (2025)
- Area served: Colombia, Panamá, Costa Rica, Honduras, El Salvador, United States (Florida)
- Key people: Javier Jose Suarez (chairman)
- Products: Banking
- Total assets: COP 224 497 billion (2025) (USD 62,03 billion)
- Total equity: COP 18 848 billion (2025) (USD 5,21 billion)
- Number of employees: 12,466 ((2025))
- Parent: Grupo Bolívar
- Website: www.davivienda.com

Davivienda is a Colombian bank founded on August 1, 1972, which renders services to individuals, companies, and the rural sector. Currently, it is part of Grupo Bolivar and it is the second-largest bank in Colombia by assets and profits. Between the Big Four banks of Colombia.

Davivienda is a compound of "da Vivienda," which is Spanish for "providing a dwelling".

== History ==
The Corporación Colombiana de Ahorro y Vivienda, Coldeahorro, was created in August 1972. It opened its doors to the public on November 15, 1972, with the main branch in Bogotá, and one branch in each of the cities of Medellín, Cali, and Barranquilla.

On January 30, 1973, Coldeahorro changed its name to Corporación Colombiana de Ahorro y Vivienda, Davivienda.

On July 1, 1997, Davivienda became Banco Davivienda S.A. and in May 2006, it merged with Banco Superior. In 2006, it purchased Granbanco S.A. – Bancafé from the Colombian government for US$2.2 billion, outbidding Banco de Bogotá by US$327 million. The acquisition allowed Davivienda to expand its business in the corporate and agricultural markets.

Davivienda has used the "Casita Roja" (small red house) as a national and international logo since 1973. In 1994, the company introduced the "su dinero puede estar en el lugar equivocado" (your money may be in the wrong place) tagline as part of its advertising campaigns.

In May 2006, it merged with Banco Superior and, the following year, on August 27, it merged with Bancafé. This allowed the entity to enter the corporate and agricultural segments, as well as Bancafé's operations in Panama and Miami.

In 2010, Davivienda received permission from the United States Federal Reserve to operate a branch in Miami, Florida. The branch opened in 2011.

Davivienda purchased the Costa Rica, El Salvador, and Honduras operations of HSBC in 2012.

On November 6, 2021, Davivienda announced that Rappi Bank would arrive in Colombia in 2022 in alliance with Rappi, an entity that would absorb the 760,000 Rappi Pay customers and more than 100,000 RappiCard credit card customers in Colombia.

On January 6, 2025, Scotiabank and Davivienda announced a merger agreement in some Latin American countries through which Scotiabank would own 20% of Davivienda, and the latter would absorb Scotiabank Colpatria (Colombia), Scotiabank Panama and Costa Rica. These operations would be subject to regulatory approvals throughout 2025. With this merger, Davivienda became the leader in the credit card market in Colombia, increased its assets in Colombia by 30%, in Costa Rica by 90%, and in Panama by 180% (leaving 70% of the assets in Colombia and 30% in Central America), and established a global strategic alliance with Scotiabank for its operations in Colombia and Central America.

In 2026, the bank announced the opening of DAVIarena, an event center in Sabaneta with a capacity of 17,000 spectators.

=== Subsidiaries ===
The bank has the following subsidiaries:

- Fiduciaria Davivienda.
- Corredores Davivienda in Colombia, Panamá, (Miami, Estados Unidos).
- Corporación Financiera Davivienda.
- Epayco.
- Rappi Bank Colombia (50%).

=== International Operations ===
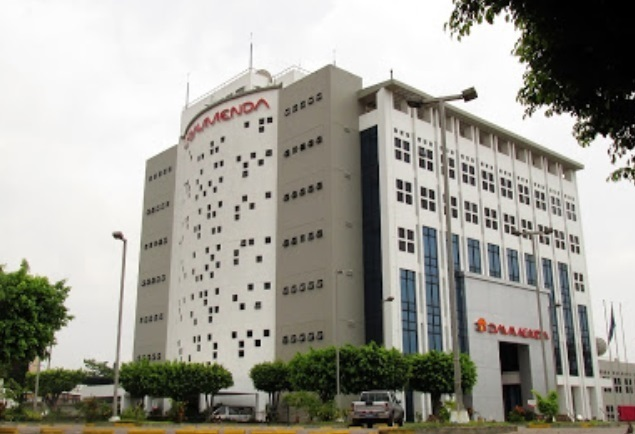
Headquarters of Davivienda El Salvador.

- Panama: (Banco Davivienda Panama).
- Costa Rica: (Banco Davivienda Costa Rica).
- Honduras: (Banco Davivienda Honduras).
- El Salvador: (Banco Davivienda El Salvador).
- Miami, United States

== See also ==
- List of largest banks in Latin America
- Rappi Bank
