= Banco Transatlántico =

Former bank in Spain and Latin America

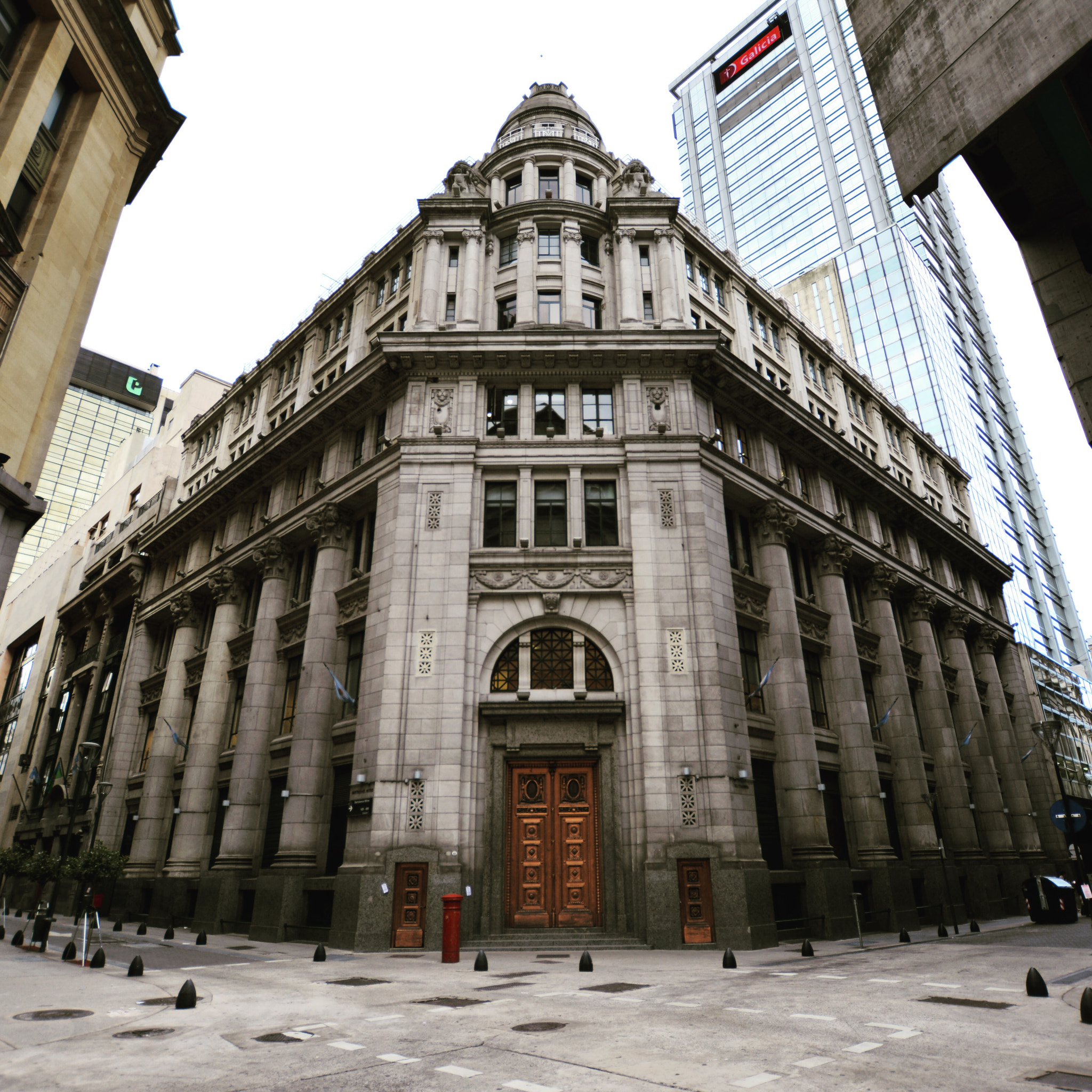
- Former branch of Banco Alemán Transatlántico in Buenos Aires
- Formerly: Deutsche Ueberseeische Bank
- Company type: Subsidiary
- Industry: Financial services
- Founded: 1886
- Defunct: 1989
- Fate: Merged into parent company
- Successor: Deutsche Bank España
- Area served: Latin America
- Products: Banking services
- Owner: Deutsche Bank

The Banco Transatlántico, also known as Bancotrans, was a German owned Latin American bank that operated in Spain and several South American countries during the 20th century.

The bank was originally established by Deutsche Bank in 1886 in Berlin as Deutsche Ueberseebank (lit. 'German Overseas Bank', DUB). The DUB was restructured in 1893 as Deutsche Ueberseeische Bank, and known in Spanish as Banco Alemán Transatlántico (lit. 'German Transatlantic Bank', BAT). It became a significant financial institution throughout Latin America in the first half of the 20th century.

In 1945, the DUB's head office relocated to Hamburg. It rebuilt its Latin American network after confiscation during World War II, and was eventually absorbed by Deutsche Bank in 1976. In Spain, the DUB's operations were expropriated in 1948 and renamed Banco Comercial Transatlántico (lit. 'Transatlantic Trade Bank', BCT) in 1950. Deutsche Bank gradually rejoined BCT as a shareholder, with a 10 percent stake in 1957 growing to 25 percent in 1971 until regaining majority control of BCT in 1989 and renaming it Deutsche Bank España in 1994.

== History ==
=== Early years ===
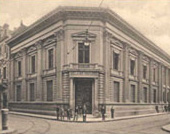
BAT building in Buenos Aires, ca. 1900

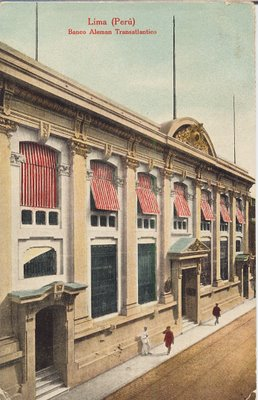
BAT building in Lima, 1925 postcard

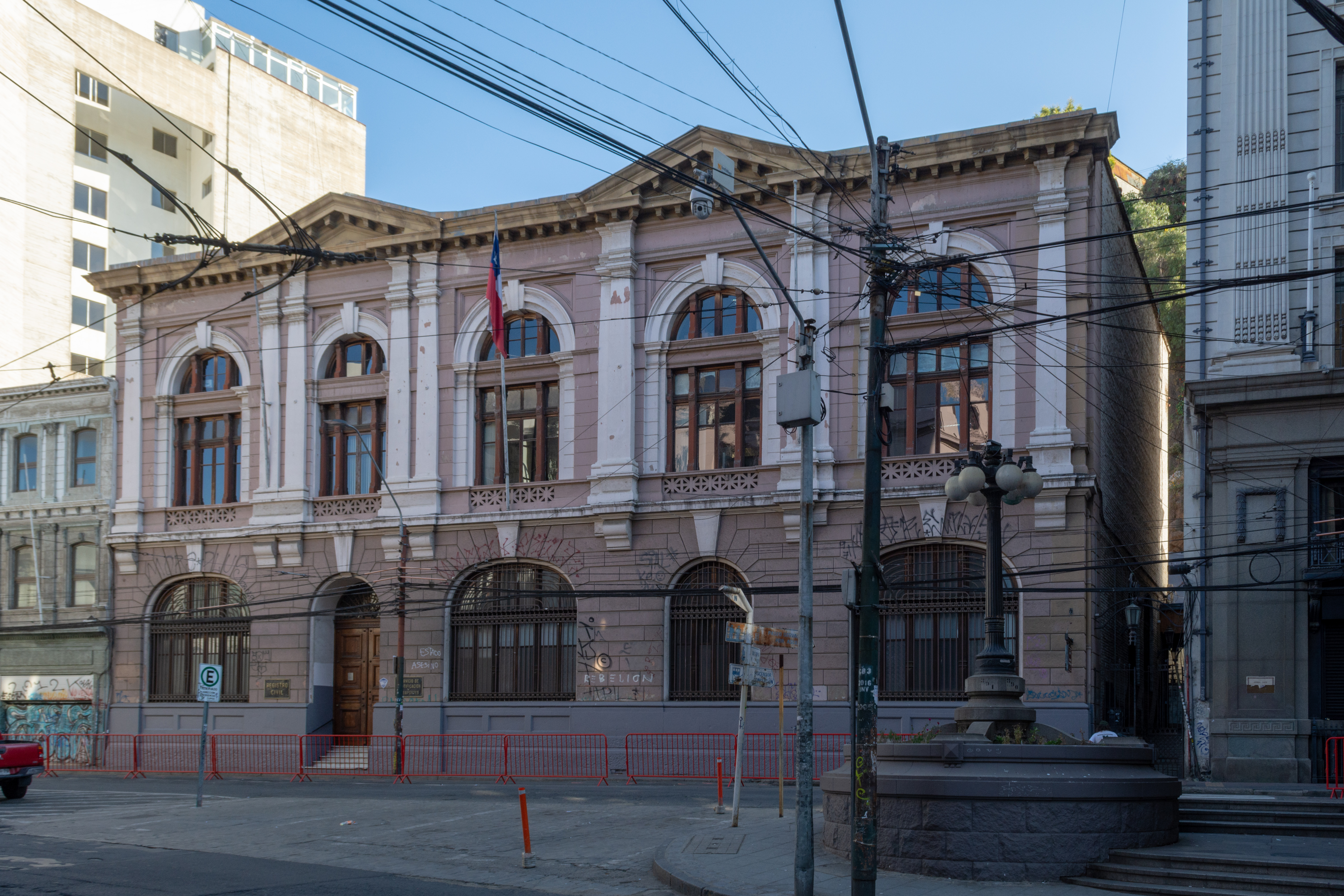
Former BAT building in Valparaíso

The Deutsche Ueberseebank was founded on 2 October 1886 by Deutsche Bank, at the request of the German government with the intent of breaking the British quasi-monopoly in trade with the Americas. It soon established a representative office in London, and on 5 August 1887, a first branch in Argentina branded the Banco Alemán Transatlántico (BAT) in Buenos Aires.

In 1889, Deutsche Bank in partnership with Arthur Gwinner sponsored the creation of the Banco Hispano-Alemán as its affiliate in Spain, initially focused on financing a public lighting contract that AEG had won in Madrid. In 1894, this venture was converted into a limited partnership named Guillermo Vogel & Co. In 1904, the DUB opened a branch in Barcelona under the name Banco Alemán Transatlántico, and in 1906 Guillermo Vogel & Co. became the Madrid branch of DUB. A third Spanish branch followed in Seville in 1928.

In 1893 the DUB was re-organized and renamed as Deutsche Ueberseeische Bank with a capital of 20 million reichmarks. In 1896, another BAT branch opened in Valparaíso, competing with the Bank für Chile und Deutschland established the previous year by the Disconto-Gesellschaft and Norddeutsche Bank.

By 1914, the BAT had branches in Argentina (Bahía Blanca, Córdoba, San Miguel de Tucumán, Bell Ville, and 3 branches in Buenos Aires); Chile (Valparaíso, Santiago, Concepción, Valdivia, Osorno, Temuco, Antofagasta, Iquique); Bolivia (La Paz, Oruro); Peru (Lima, Callao, Arequipa, Trujillo); Brazil (Rio de Janeiro); Uruguay (Montevideo); and Spain (Barcelona, Madrid and Seville). DUB was able to keep its South American business and its branches there intact through the turmoil of World War I, temporarily using improvised information systems. In 1930, it took over the Banco Brasileiro Allemão, formerly a branch of the Brasilianische Bank für Deutschland founded in 1887 in Hamburg by the Disconto-Gesellschaft in partnership with the Norddeutsche Bank.

=== World War II and aftermath ===
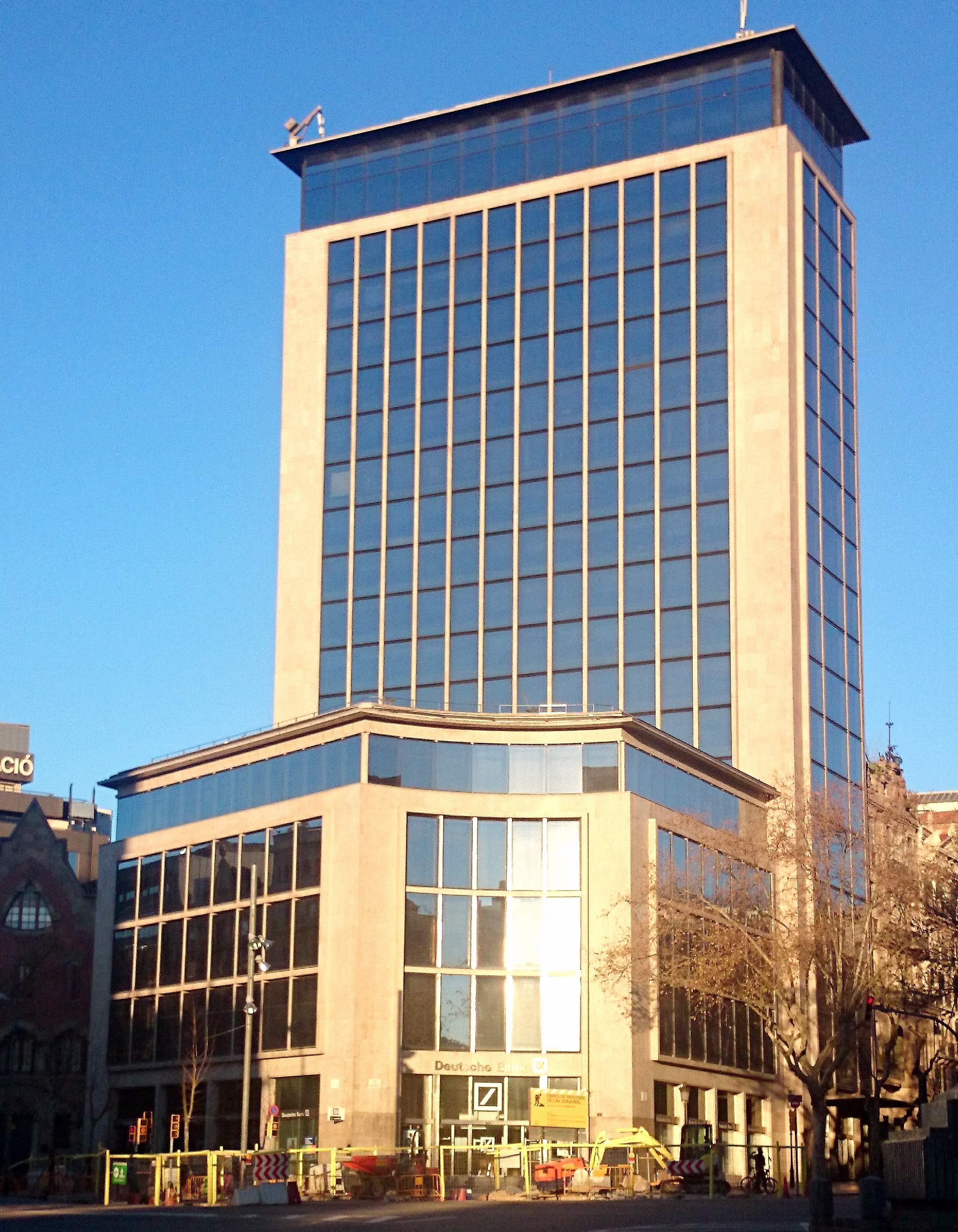
Edificio Europa, seat of BCT then of Deutsche Bank in Barcelona, pictured in 2016 before conversion into apartments

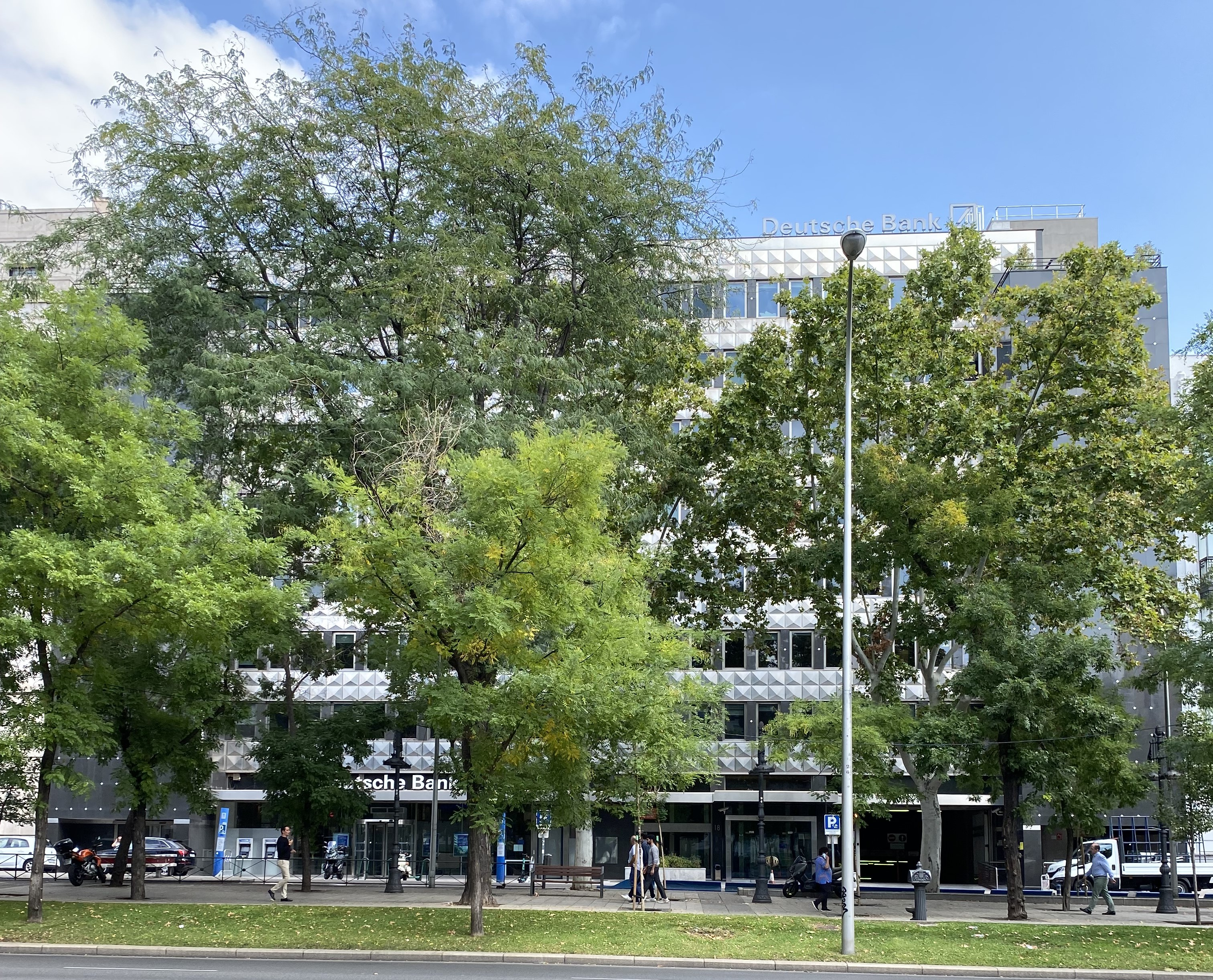
Former BCT building, now Deutsche Bank at Paseo de la Castellana 18 in Madrid

During World War II, by contrast, all of the DUB/BAT branches in South America were expropriated, even in Argentina where Juan Perón, despite his sympathies for the Axis powers, declared war on Germany in March 1945 under U.S. pressure. In 1948, the bank was also expropriated from Spain as part of a post-war settlement between the victorious Allies and Francisco Franco. Subsequently, the Spanish operations were reorganized in 1950 as Banco Comercial Transatlántico, widely referred to as Bancotrans, with head office in Barcelona. Meanwhile and with continued support from Deutsche Bank, DUB restarted activity in Germany from its former branch in Hamburg, as the Berlin head office (at Friedrichstraße 103) had been liquidated in 1945 together with all commercial banks in the Soviet occupation zone in Germany.

German foreign trade started up again after the London Agreement on German External Debts in 1953 and gained momentum after the Deutsche Mark was made convertible again in 1958. As early as 1954, the DUB had established joint offices with the Deutsche Bank Group in Buenos Aires, Mexico City, São Paulo, Rio de Janeiro, Caracas, and Santiago in Chile. A fully-fledged branch reopened in Buenos Aires in 1960, the first foreign branch of any German bank after the war, in line with Argentine government's favorable orientation towards Germany - but in contrast to the Banco Germánico, formerly a branch of the Deutsch-Südamerikanische Bank controlled by Dresdner Bank, which was not allowed to reopen at the same time. Other branches followed in São Paulo (1969) and Asunción (1971). DUB also expanded beyond South America by opening a branch in Tokyo in 1971, two branches in Germany, and an office in Luxembourg.

=== Absorption into Deutsche Bank ===
In 1976, DUB was fully absorbed by Deutsche Bank, and its foreign branches adopted the Deutsche Bank brand in 1978. In Spain, Deutsche Bank opened branches of its own in Madrid and Barcelona in 1979, while gradually increasing its shareholding of Banco Comercial Transatlántico. In 1989, it eventually acquired majority control of BCT, which it further expanded by acquiring Banco Madrid in 1993. In the 2010s, Deutsche Bank attempted to sell its Spanish subsidiary, but without success.

== See also ==
- Deutsch-Asiatische Bank
- Deutsche Orientbank
- Deutsche Bank (Italy)
- List of banks in Germany
- List of banks in Spain
