= Bancolombia =

Colombian financial institution

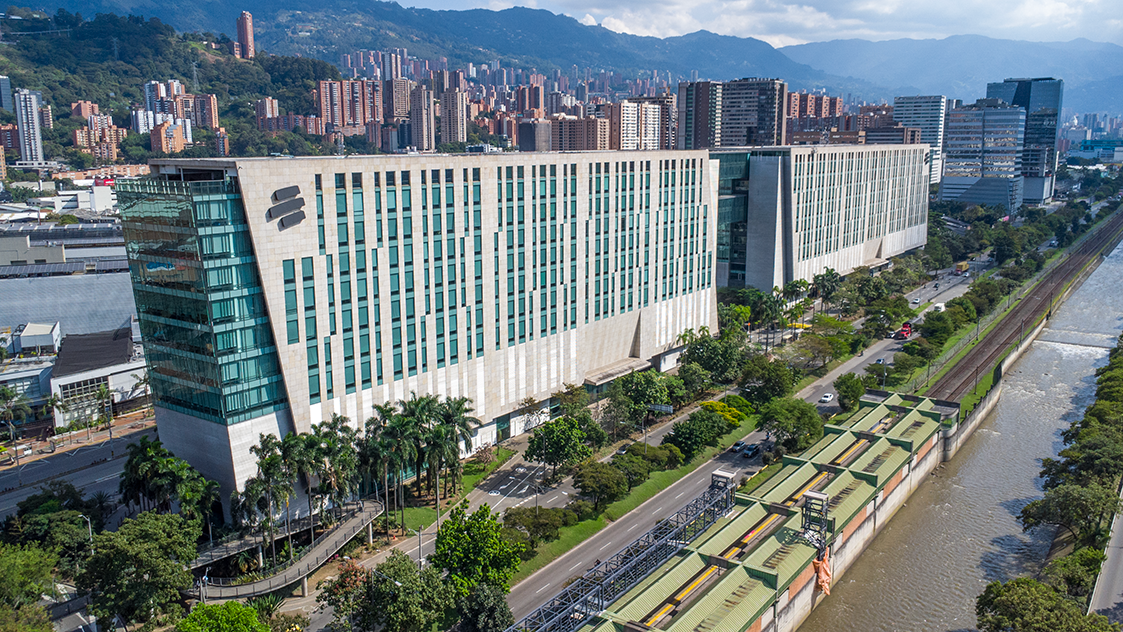
- Headquarters in Medellin
- Company type: Sociedad Anónima
- Traded as: BVC: BCOLOMBIA; NYSE: CIB
- ISIN: COT13PA00086
- Industry: Financial services
- Founded: 29 January 1875; 151 years ago (as Banco de Colombia)
- Headquarters: Medellín, Colombia
- Number of locations: 650 (2025)
- Area served: Colombia, Panama and Puerto Rico
- Key people: Luis Fernando Restrepo (Chairman); Juan Carlos Mora Uríbe (CEO)
- Products: Banking
- Total assets: COP 264 790 billion (2025) (USD 73,38 billion)
- Total equity: COP 29 080 billion (2025) (USD 8,06 billion)
- Number of employees: 23 600 (2025)
- Parent: Grupo Cibest
- Website: Official website

Bancolombia S.A. (formerly: Banco de Colombia) is a full-service financial institution that provides financial products and services in Colombia, Panama and Puerto Rico. Bancolombia is one of the six banking-related companies of the COLCAP index. The Bank operates in nine segments: Banking Colombia, Banking El Salvador, Leasing, Trust, Investment, Brokerage, Off Shore and Insurance, and all other segments.

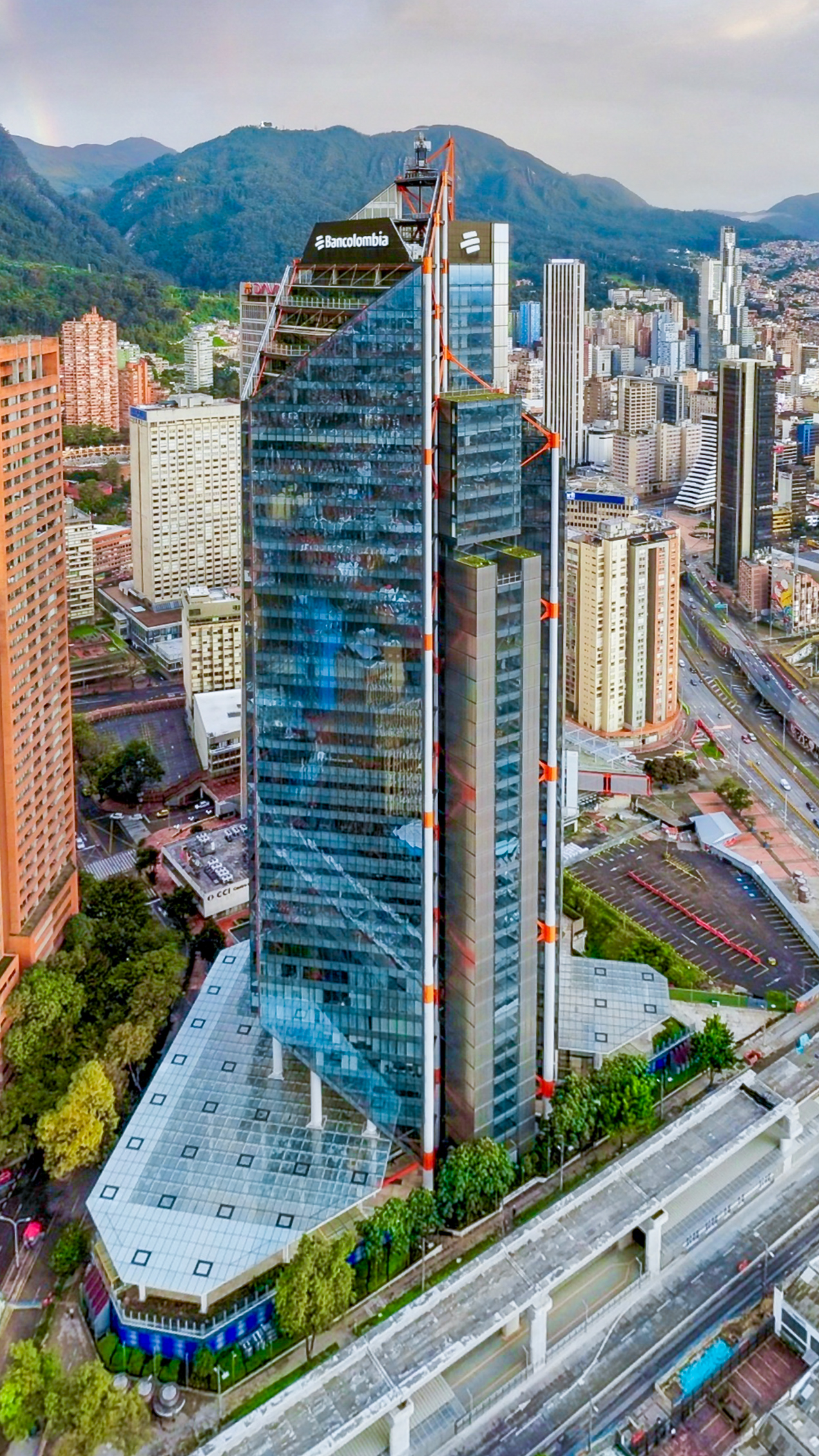
Main office in Bogotá

As of December 31, 2023, the Bank's consolidated branch network consisted of 938 offices. As of December 31, 2025, the bank had 16,297,225 customers.

== History ==
Bancolombia was founded on January 29, 1875 as "Banco de Colombia" in Medellín, Colombia. In 1929 the bank began trading on the Bolsa de Bogotá. In 1995 the bank became the first Colombian company to trade on the New York Stock Exchange.

In 1983, the Grupo Grancolombiano crisis occurred. The main measure taken by the government was the nationalization of Banco de Colombia, and operated as a state entity until 1994.

In 1998 "Banco de Colombia" and "Banco Industrial Colombiano (BIC)" are consolidated, born in this way Bancolombia.

In 2005 Bancolombia fuses with "Conavi" and "Corfinsura" to create "Grupo Bancolombia".

In 2013 they acquired the operations of HSBC Bank Panama, renamed Banistmo.

In 2021 Bancolombia renews its corporative image, along with all entities that conform the "Grupo Bancolombia".

In 2025, Bancolombia announced the creation of Grupo Cibest in a context of reorganization and would be its new parent company replacing Grupo Bancolombia.

== See also ==
- List of largest banks in Latin America
