= Grupo Banistmo =

Panamanian financial services company

- Industry: Financial services
- Founded: 1984; 42 years ago
- Defunct: 2006
- Fate: Acquired by HSBC Holding
- Key people: Alberto Vallarino Clement (President/CEO)

Grupo Banistmo was a Panamanian financial services company, and the largest in Central America. It was founded in 1984. In 1999 it began an expansion strategy that has resulted in the acquisition of banks in several Central American countries, as well as Colombia and the Bahamas. It was the holding company of Primer Banco del Istmo, S.A. or Banistmo, the largest bank in Panama. Its President and Chief Executive Officer was Alberto Vallarino. In November 2006 it was acquired by HSBC Holdings plc, and merged with HSBC Bank (Panama) S.A., the bank's existing subsidiary in 2007. In 2013 Bancolombia Group acquired HSBC Panama and renamed it Banistmo.

== See also ==
- HSBC Mexico
