= Forum Park, Houston =

Human settlement in Houston, Texas, US

Coordinates: 29.670°N 95.555°W

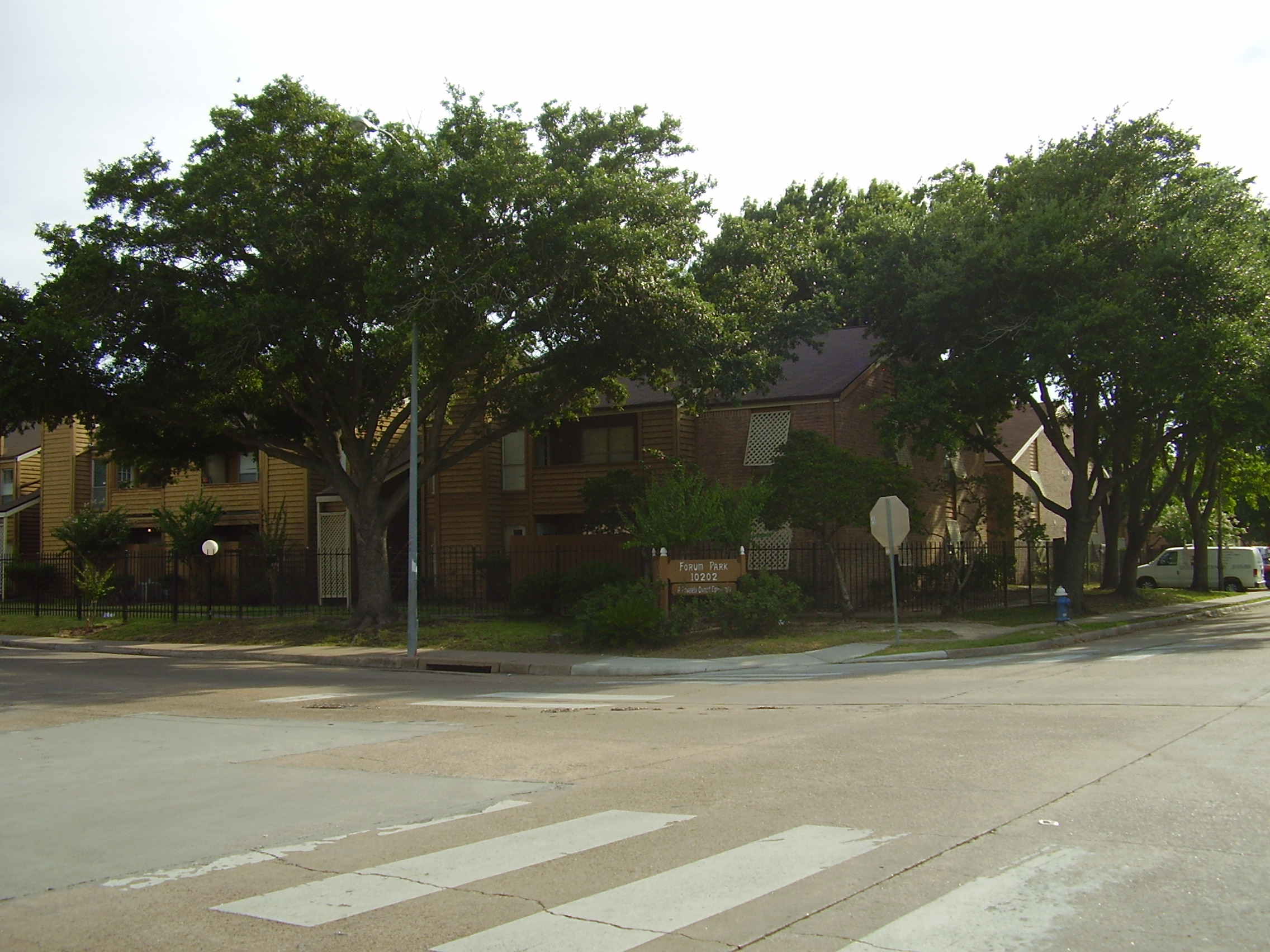
Forum Park Apartments

Forum Park is a community in Houston, Texas. It is bounded by Texas State Highway Beltway 8, U.S. Route 59 (Southwest Freeway), and Bissonnet Road. A portion of the community resides in the Greater Sharpstown district.

The community includes many large apartments and townhouses with high population densities. As of 2009, many apartments and townhouses were not well maintained. The pools at the complexes were not well maintained, and trash pickup was not up to standard.

== City government ==
Houston City Council District J now covers Forum Park. District J was created to allow Hispanics to more easily elect representatives who cater to them. Robert Jara, a political consultant of the group Campaign Strategies, drew the boundaries of District J in order to ensure that Sharpstown and Gulfton were together in one area. That way, the Hispanic residents could lobby for influence with their city council representative, whether he or she is of Hispanic origin or not. In the 2000s, Forum Park was in District C. In the 1990s, Forum Park was in District F.

== Education ==
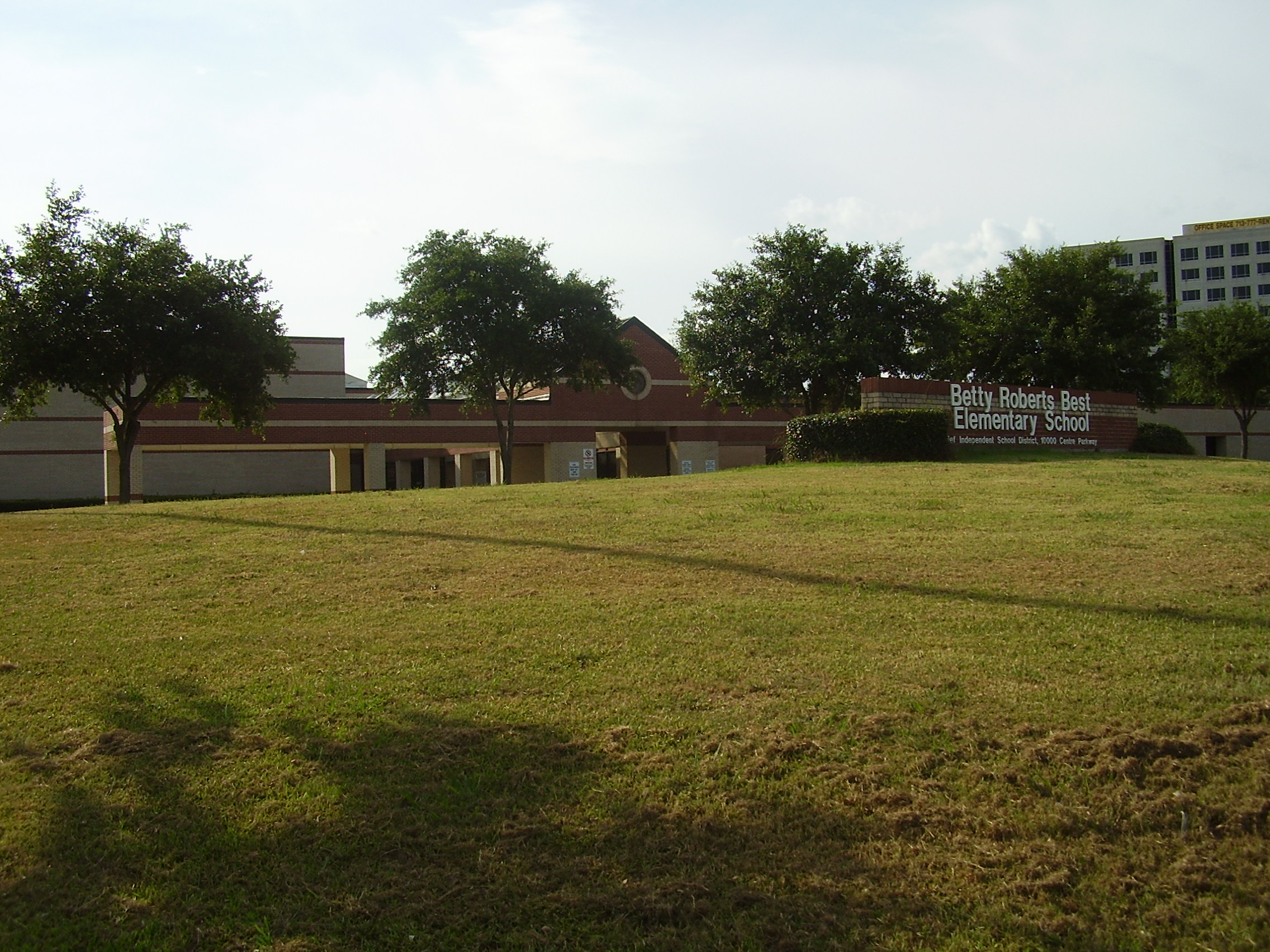
Betty Roberts Best Elementary School

Residents are within the Alief Independent School District. Residents are zoned to Betty Roberts Best Elementary School in Forum Park, Klentzman Intermediate School, and Olle Middle School.

All Alief ISD residents are assigned high schools through a lottery. Outcomes include Elsik, Hastings, and Taylor. The district also maintains two magnet schools, Kerr High School and Alief Early College High School.

== Parks and recreation ==
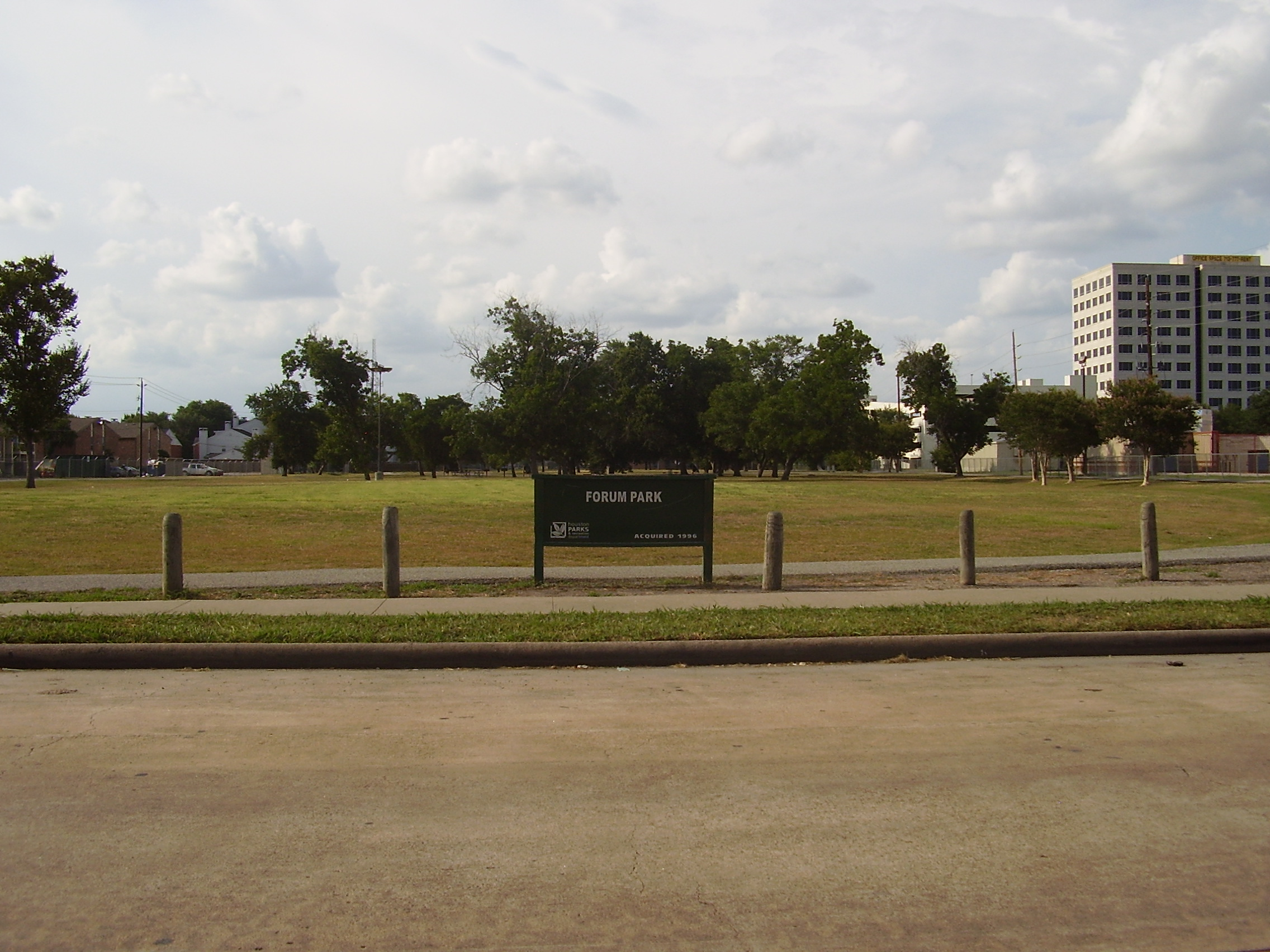
Forum Park

The City of Houston operates Forum Park in the community. The park includes a trail system. In 1993 the community Forum Park had no parks within the community. During that year, Houston City Council member John Goodner argued that Forum Park needed a park under the city's "Neighborhoods to Standard" program. Goodner said "They desperately need a park. You can't tell kids to ride their bicycles across the freeway to get to the nearest park."

== See also ==
- Gulfton, Houston
- Link Valley, Houston
