= Mission Bend, Texas =

- Census-designated place
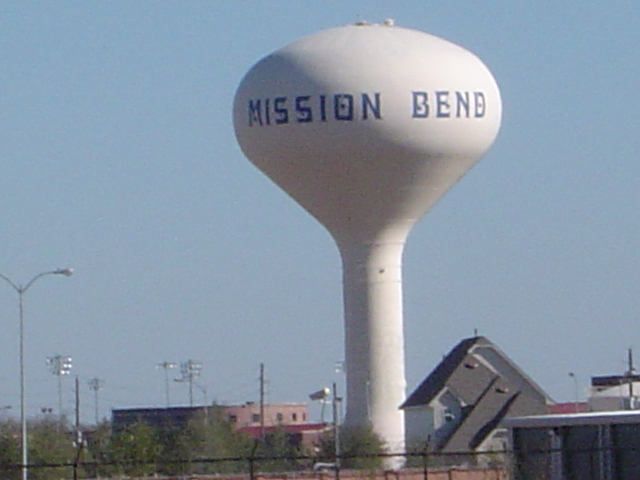
- A Mission Bend water tower

- Location in Harris County and the state of Texas
- Coordinates: 29°41′37″N 95°39′42″W
- Country: United States
- State: Texas
- Counties: Fort Bend, Harris

Area
  - Total: 4.9 sq mi (12.7 km^{2})
  - Land: 4.9 sq mi (12.6 km^{2})
  - Water: 0.039 sq mi (0.1 km^{2})
- Elevation: 95 ft (29 m)

Population (2020)
  - Total: 36,914
  - Density: 7,590/sq mi (2,930/km^{2})
- Time zone: UTC-6 (Central (CST))
  - Summer (DST): UTC-5 (CDT)
- FIPS code: 48-48772
- GNIS feature ID: 1867556

Mission Bend is a census-designated place (CDP) around Texas State Highway 6 within the extraterritorial jurisdiction of Houston in Fort Bend and Harris counties in the U.S. state of Texas; Mission Bend is 4 miles (6 km) northwest of the city hall of Sugar Land and 20 miles (32 km) southwest of Downtown Houston. The population was 36,914 at the 2020 census.

== History ==
Mission Bend began in the early 1980s. The area gained population between 1980 and 1990. In 1990, the community had 24,945 residents. By 2000, many of the area's residents commuted to Houston.

The City of Houston did a limited purpose annexation of a portion of the Mission Bend area after the year 2000, therefore reducing the CDP's territory.

== Geography ==
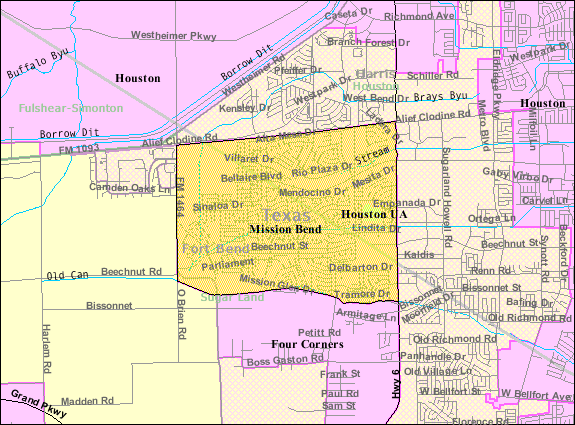
Map of the Mission Bend CDP (2000)

Mission Bend is located at 29°41′37″N 95°39′42″W (29.693667, -95.661721).

According to the United States Census Bureau, the CDP has a total area of 4.9 square miles (12.6 km^{2}), of which 4.9 square miles (12.6 km^{2}) is land and 0.039 square miles (0.1 km^{2}), or 0.41%, is water.

== Demographics ==
Historical population
Census	Pop.	Note	%±
1990	24,945		—
2000	30,831		23.6%
2010	36,501		18.4%
2020	36,914		1.1%
U.S. Decennial Census; 1850–1900 1910; 1920 1930 1940; 1950 1960 1970; 1980 1990 2000; 2010 2020

Mission Bend first appeared as a census designated place in the 1990 U.S. census.

=== Racial and ethnic composition ===
Mission Bend CDP, Texas – Racial and ethnic composition Note: the US Census treats Hispanic/Latino as an ethnic category. This table excludes Latinos from the racial categories and assigns them to a separate category. Hispanics/Latinos may be of any race.
Race / Ethnicity (NH = Non-Hispanic)	Pop 2000	Pop 2010	Pop 2020	% 2000	% 2010	% 2020
White alone (NH)	9,806	4,975	3,646	31.81%	13.63%	9.88%
Black or African American alone (NH)	6,546	10,581	9,933	21.23%	28.99%	26.91%
Native American or Alaska Native alone (NH)	50	55	56	0.16%	0.15%	0.15%
Asian alone (NH)	5,025	5,510	5,873	16.88%	15.10%	15.91%
Native Hawaiian or Pacific Islander alone (NH)	21	11	6	0.07%	0.03%	0.02%
Other Race alone (NH)	108	109	148	0.35%	0.30%	0.40%
Mixed race or Multiracial (NH)	752	542	679	2.44%	1.48%	1.84%
Hispanic or Latino (any race)	8,343	14,718	16,573	27.06%	40.32%	44.90%
Total	30,831	36,501	36,914	100.00%	100.00%	100.00%

=== 2020 census ===
As of the 2020 census, Mission Bend had a population of 36,914 and 10,776 households, including 8,997 families. The median age was 36.9 years. 24.4% of residents were under the age of 18 and 12.3% of residents were 65 years of age or older. For every 100 females there were 94.3 males, and for every 100 females age 18 and over there were 91.2 males age 18 and over.

100.0% of residents lived in urban areas, while 0.0% lived in rural areas.

There were 10,776 households in Mission Bend, of which 42.4% had children under the age of 18 living in them. Of all households, 55.3% were married-couple households, 13.4% were households with a male householder and no spouse or partner present, and 26.4% were households with a female householder and no spouse or partner present. About 12.7% of all households were made up of individuals and 5.1% had someone living alone who was 65 years of age or older.

There were 11,135 housing units, of which 3.2% were vacant. The homeowner vacancy rate was 1.0% and the rental vacancy rate was 6.0%.

Racial composition as of the 2020 census
Race	Number	Percent
White	6,517	17.7%
Black or African American	10,144	27.5%
American Indian and Alaska Native	438	1.2%
Asian	5,922	16.0%
Native Hawaiian and Other Pacific Islander	8	0.0%
Some other race	7,973	21.6%
Two or more races	5,912	16.0%
Hispanic or Latino (of any race)	16,573	44.9%

=== 2000 census ===
As of the census of 2000, there were 30,831 people, 8,978 households, and 7,864 families residing in the CDP. The population density was 5,900.1 inhabitants per square mile (2,278.0/km^{2}). There were 9,202 housing units at an average density of 1,761.0 per square mile (679.9/km^{2}). The racial makeup of the CDP was 46.32% White, 21.50% African American, 0.31% Native American, 16.96% Asian, 0.08% Pacific Islander, 10.63% from other races, and 4.20% from two or more races. Hispanic or Latino of any race were 27.06% of the population.

There were 8,978 households, out of which 55.7% had children under the age of 18 living with them, 70.5% were married couples living together, 12.5% had a female householder with no husband present, and 12.4% were non-families. 9.5% of all households were made up of individuals, and 1.1% had someone living alone who was 65 years of age or older. The average household size was 3.43 and the average family size was 3.67.

In the CDP, the population was spread out, with 33.7% under the age of 18, 8.1% from 18 to 24, 32.9% from 25 to 44, 21.4% from 45 to 64, and 3.9% who were 65 years of age or older. The median age was 32 years. For every 100 females, there were 97.2 males. For every 100 females age 18 and over, there were 92.2 males.

The median income for a household in the CDP was $60,222, and the median income for a family was $60,999. Males had a median income of $39,323 versus $31,119 for females. The per capita income for the CDP was $20,029. About 4.5% of families and 5.7% of the population were below the poverty line, including 7.5% of those under age 18 and 8.9% of those age 65 or over.

== Government and infrastructure ==
The Harris County Sheriff's Office serves the Harris County side. It operates the Mission Bend Storefront in an unincorporated area in the International District adjacent to the CDP.

Community Volunteer Fire Department Station #4 is located adjacent to the CDP, in a limited purpose annexed part of Houston. As of the 2000 U.S. census and before, this area was in the Mission Bend CDP.

Harris Health serves as the hospital district for Harris County. Fort Bend County does not have a hospital district. OakBend Medical Center serves as the county's charity hospital which the county contracts with. Other medical facilities in the area include the 24-hour SignatureCare Emergency Center located on Highway 6 and Beechnut Street.

== Education ==
=== Primary and secondary schools ===
==== Public schools ====
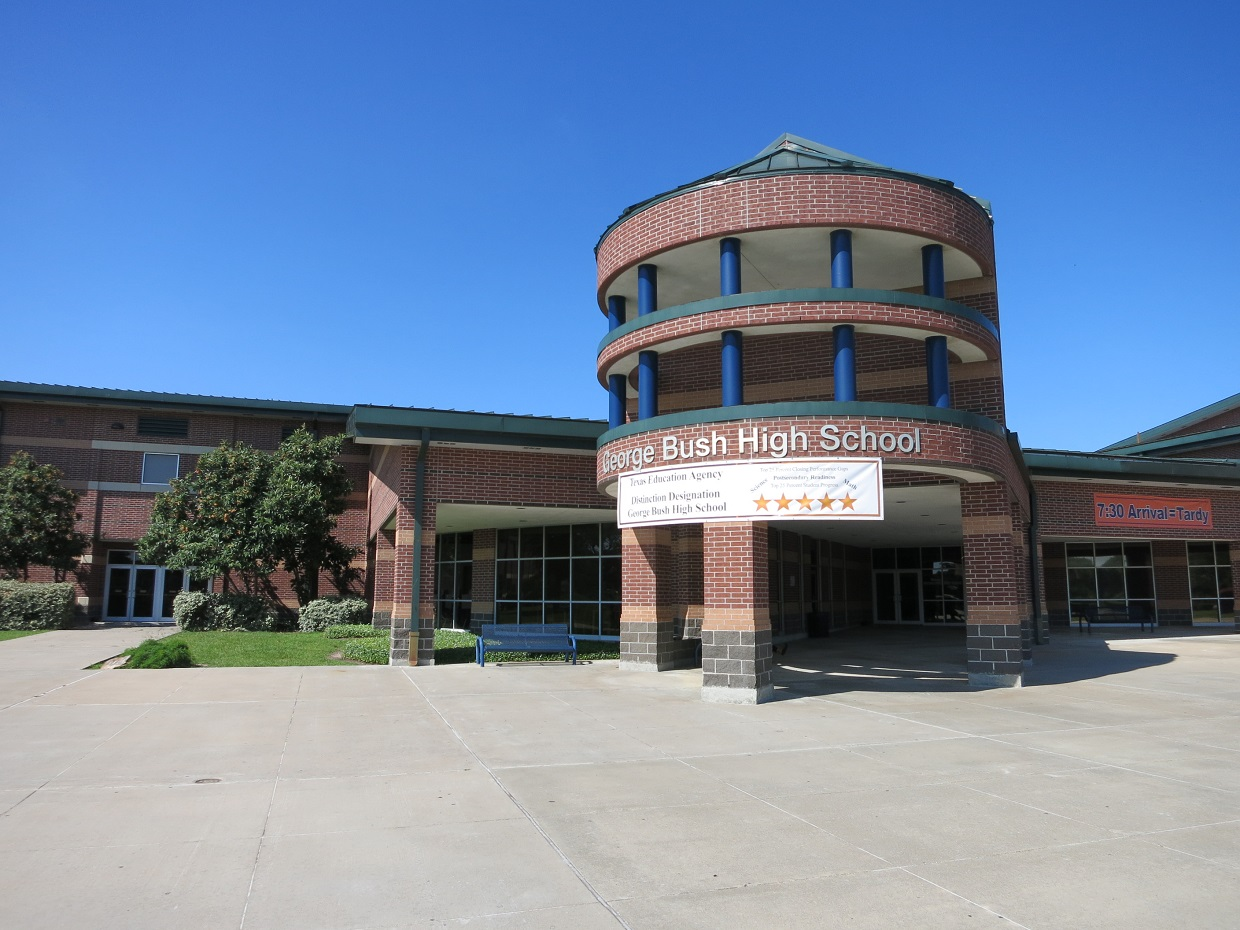
George Bush High School

Mission Bend CDP residents in Fort Bend County are zoned to schools in the Fort Bend Independent School District. Mission Bend CDP residents in Harris County are zoned to schools in the Alief Independent School District.

The Fort Bend County section is within the West Division, controlling school board slots 1 through 3.

Elementary schools serving the FBISD section of the Mission Bend CDP and within the Mission Bend CDP include: Mission Elementary. Mary Austin Holley Elementary and Townewest Elementary also serve small parts of Mission Bend despite being outside the Mission Bend CDP. Hodges Bend Middle School, located in the Four Corners CDP, serves almost all of the FBISD portion of the CDP, while Crockett Middle School, outside of the Mission Bend CDP, serves a small portion. George Bush High School, located in the Mission Bend CDP, serves the FBISD section of the Mission Bend CDP.

Alief schools that serve Harris County areas in the Mission Bend CDP include Petrosky Elementary School (in the CDP), Miller Intermediate School (outside of the CDP) for non-bilingual and bilingual students, and Albright Middle School (inside the CDP). Elementary school bilingual students are zoned to Rees Elementary School. Alief ISD students are randomly assigned to either Elsik, Hastings, or Taylor high schools. None of the high schools are within the Mission Bend CDP. The district also maintains two magnet schools, Kerr High School and Alief Early College High School.

In 2023 Mission Bend and Glen elementary schools consolidated, due to decreased enrollments.

In 2026, Mission West Elementary School, located in the Mission Bend CDP, and Arizona Fleming Elementary School, located in the Four Corners CDP, were two of seven elementary schools that were closed following FBISD's $56 million budget deficit.

There is a charter K-8 school, International Leadership of Westpark, in Mission Bend CDP.

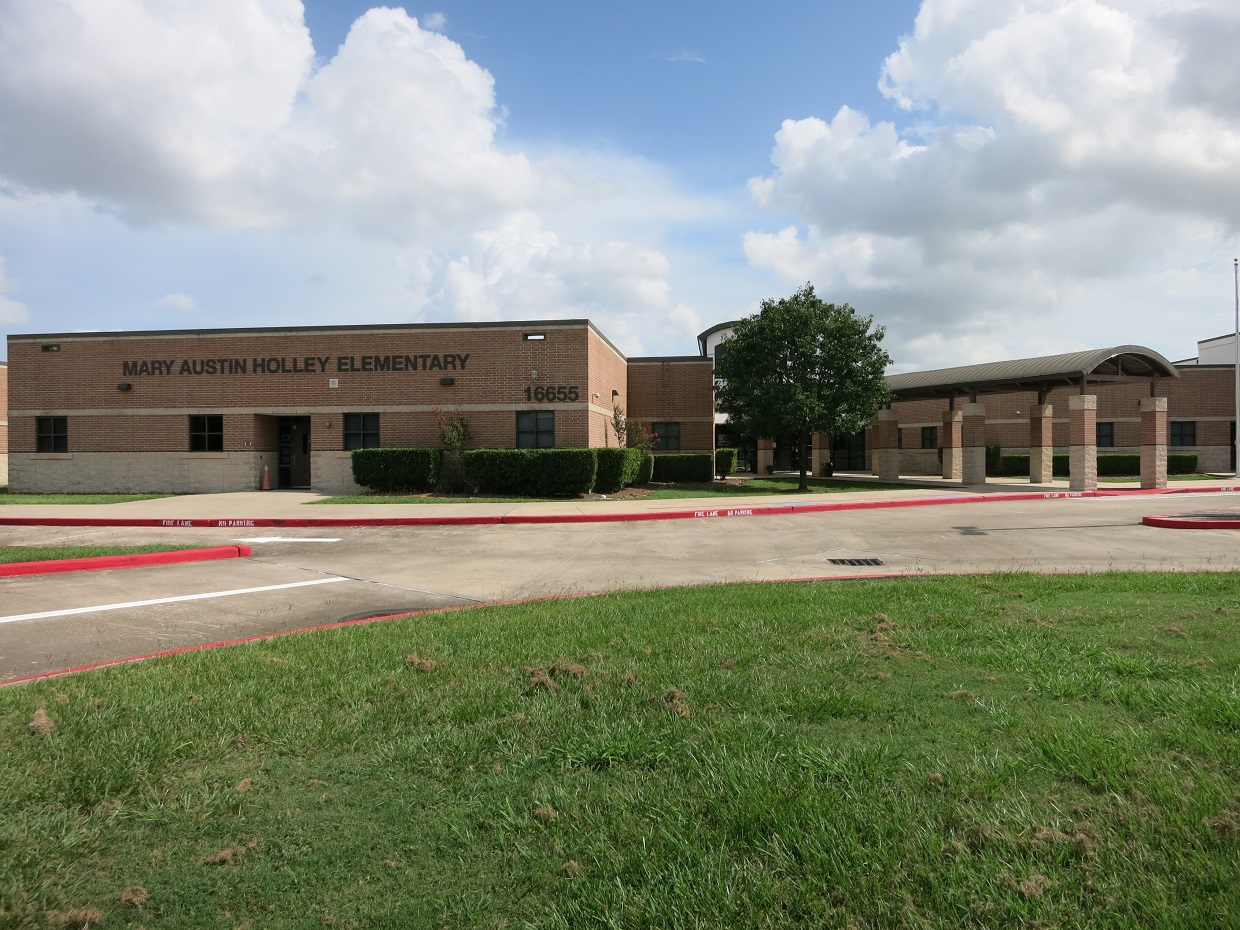
Mary Austin Holley Elementary School

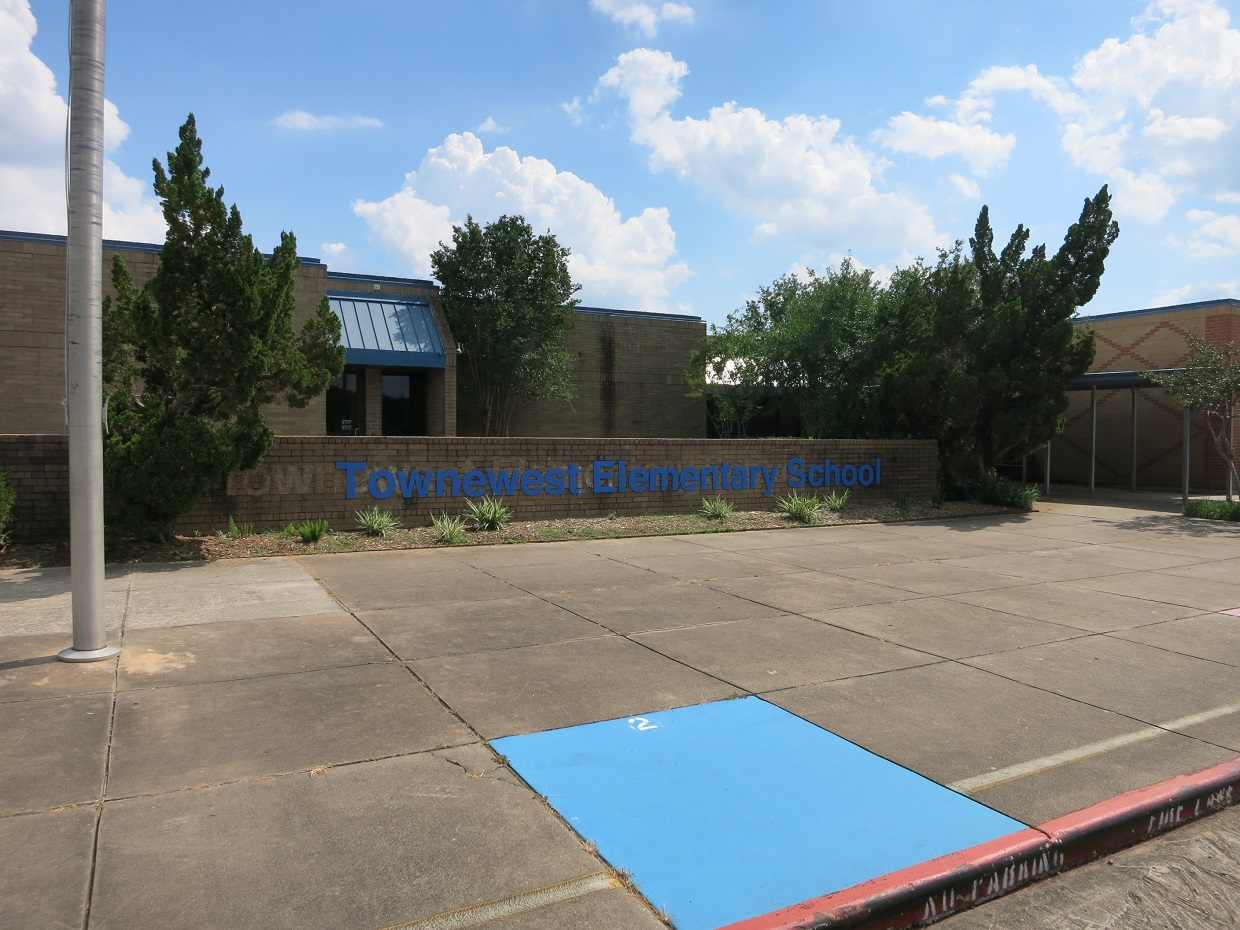
Townewest Elementary School

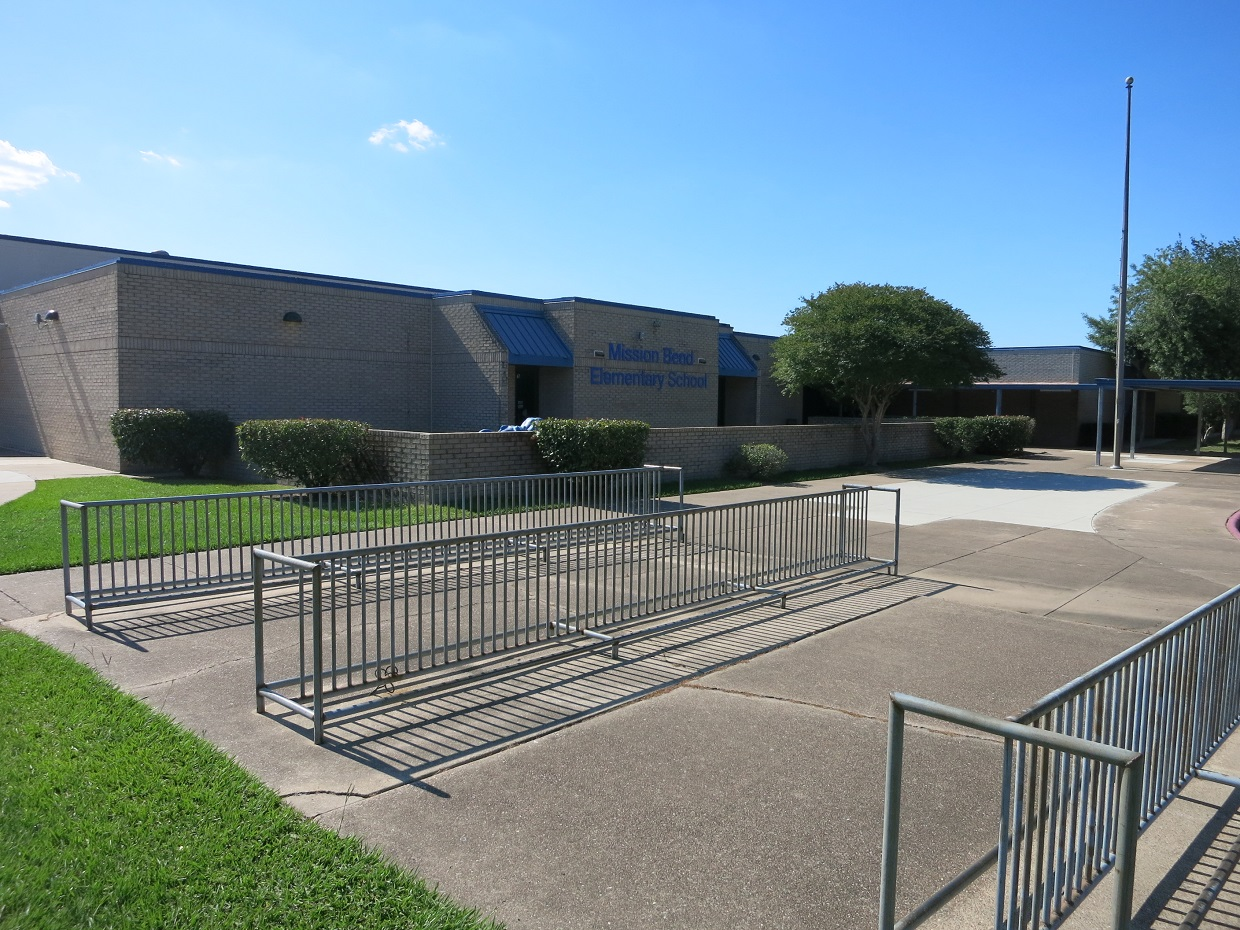
Mission Bend Elementary (Former)

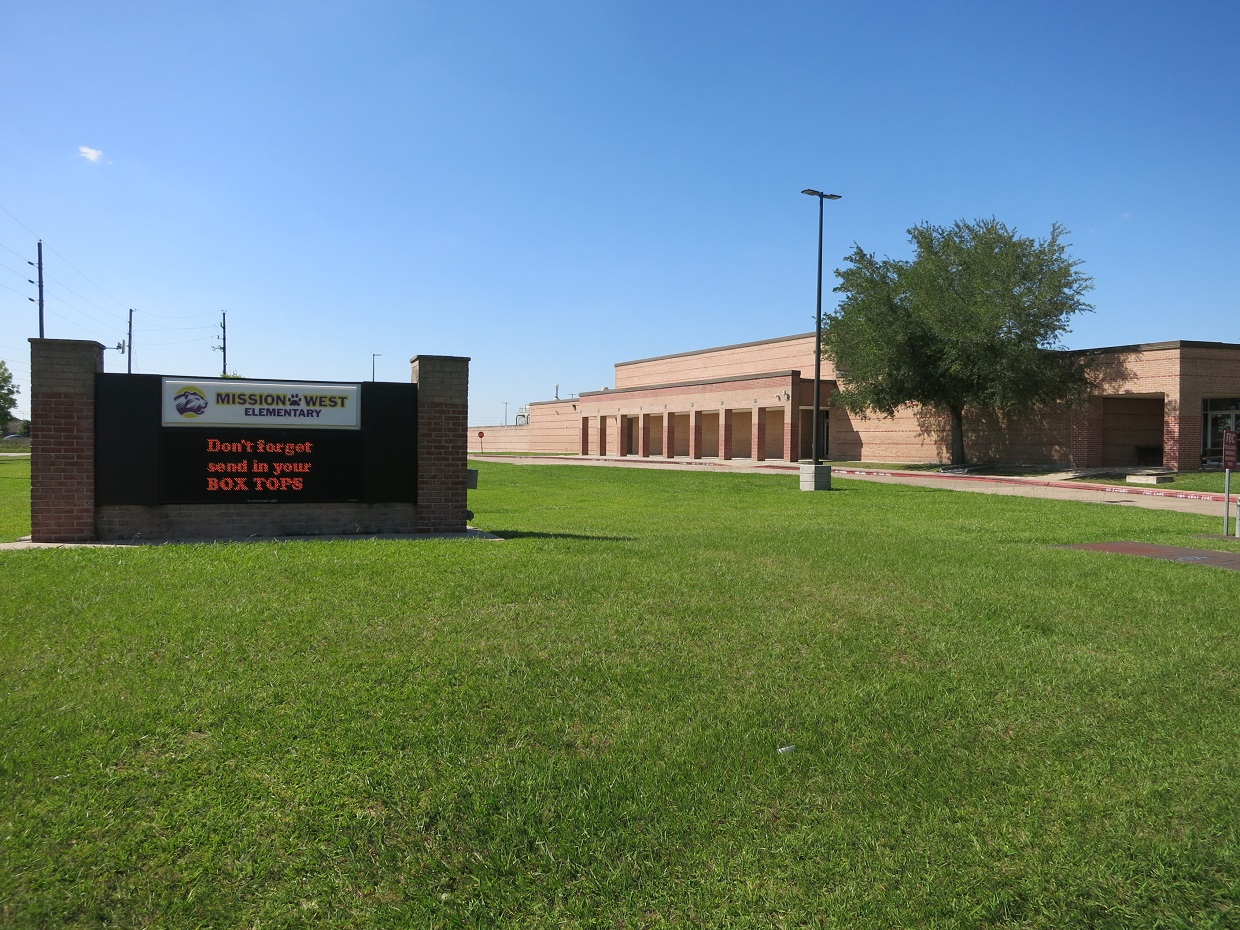
Mission West Elementary (Former)

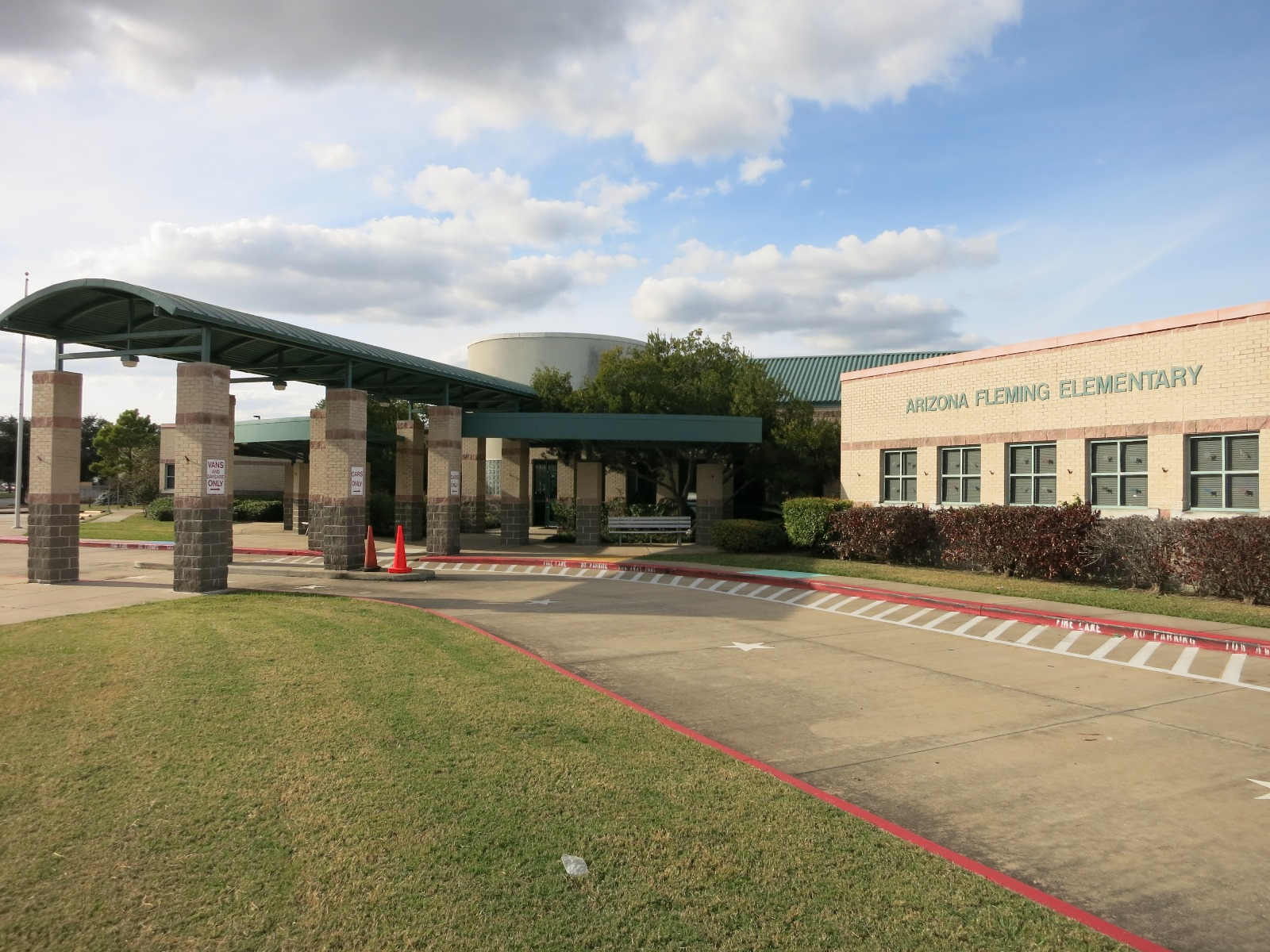
Arizona Fleming Elementary (Former)

==== Private schools ====
Iman Academy Southwest is currently in the limited purpose Houston city limits. Previously it was in Mission Bend CDP.

Mission Bend Christian Academy is located north of the CDP.

=== Colleges and universities ===
The Texas Legislature designated Houston Community College System (HCC) as serving Alief ISD. Additionally, it specifies that the HCC boundary includes "the part of the Fort Bend Independent School District that is not located in the service area of the Wharton County Junior College District and that is adjacent to the Houston Community College System District." Wharton College's boundary within FBISD is defined only as the City of Sugar Land and the ETJ of Sugar Land, and the Fort Bend portion is in the Houston ETJ, not the Sugar Land ETJ. Mission Bend is in HCC.

=== Libraries ===
Fort Bend County Libraries operates the Mission Bend Branch.

== Parks and recreation ==
Fort Bend County owns and operates the Mission West Park in Mission Bend. The park includes a baseball blacktop, a play area, tables, a walking track, and a volleyball court.

== Transportation ==
Metropolitan Transit Authority of Harris County, Texas (METRO) operates public bus services in the area. The agency operates the Mission Bend Park and Ride in an unincorporated area of Harris County, near Mission Bend.
