= Royal Oaks Country Club =

Country club and subdivision in Texas, United States

Coordinates: 29.727100°N 95.584710°W

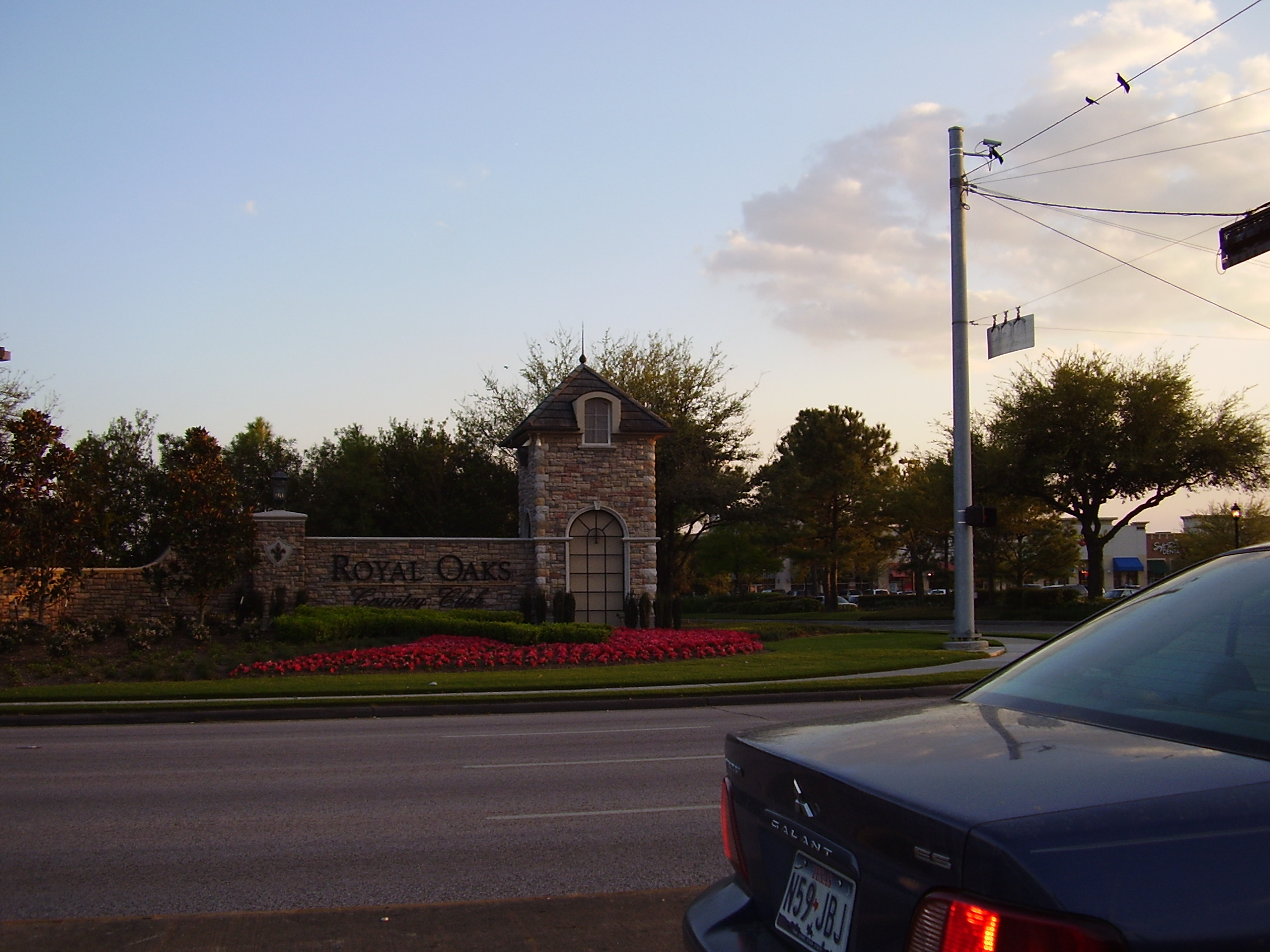
Entrance to the Royal Oaks Country Club

Royal Oaks Country Club is a country club and subdivision in Houston, Texas, United States, in the Alief community. The country club is located at 2910 Royal Oaks Club Drive, 8 miles (13 km) west of The Galleria. Sunrise Colony Company developed Royal Oaks out of the former Andrau Airpark property.

The country club portion was the first country club built in the Houston City limits in fifty years.

== History ==
Andrau Airpark closed in 1998. Sunrise Colony Co. developed Royal Oaks Country Club. The company selected the site to develop a community because of the location in proximity to several business districts (it is immediately west of the Westchase business district), The Galleria, entertainment centers, George Bush Intercontinental Airport, and William P. Hobby Airport (via the Sam Houston Tollway (Beltway 8) which runs about a mile east). Builders that agreed to develop houses in the complex include Abercrombie Custom Homes, Charles R. Martin and Associates, Jonathon Custom Estate Homes, King Residential Group, Masterpiece Homes, and McVaugh Custom Homes. As of September 8, 2000 the community developers sold 204 houses, including 34 of the 43 estate houses.

== Location and composition ==
Royal Oaks Country Club is in close proximity to Richmond Avenue and Wilcrest Avenue.

The community developers planned to establish 900 single family and estate houses; of the houses 43 were to be estate houses. As of 2000 the prices were to be set between $300,000 and over $3 million. The community offered 26 house designs. The elevations range up to 15 feet (4.6 m). The Royal Oaks community occupies 140 acres (57 ha) of land. The country club portion occupies 10,400 square feet (970 m^{2}) of land. The golf course takes 160 acres (65 ha) of land.

== Demographics ==
As of 2007 it was one of several communities that attracted upper income Mexican citizens. Wealthy Mexicans living in Houston prefer to live in gated communities with private security patrols as the environment is similar to that of wealthy neighborhoods in Mexico.

== Neighborhood services ==
Members of the community have a subdivision-wide intranet and a fiber-optic network. The community offers executive, golf, sports club and spa, and social club and swim memberships.

== Government and infrastructure ==
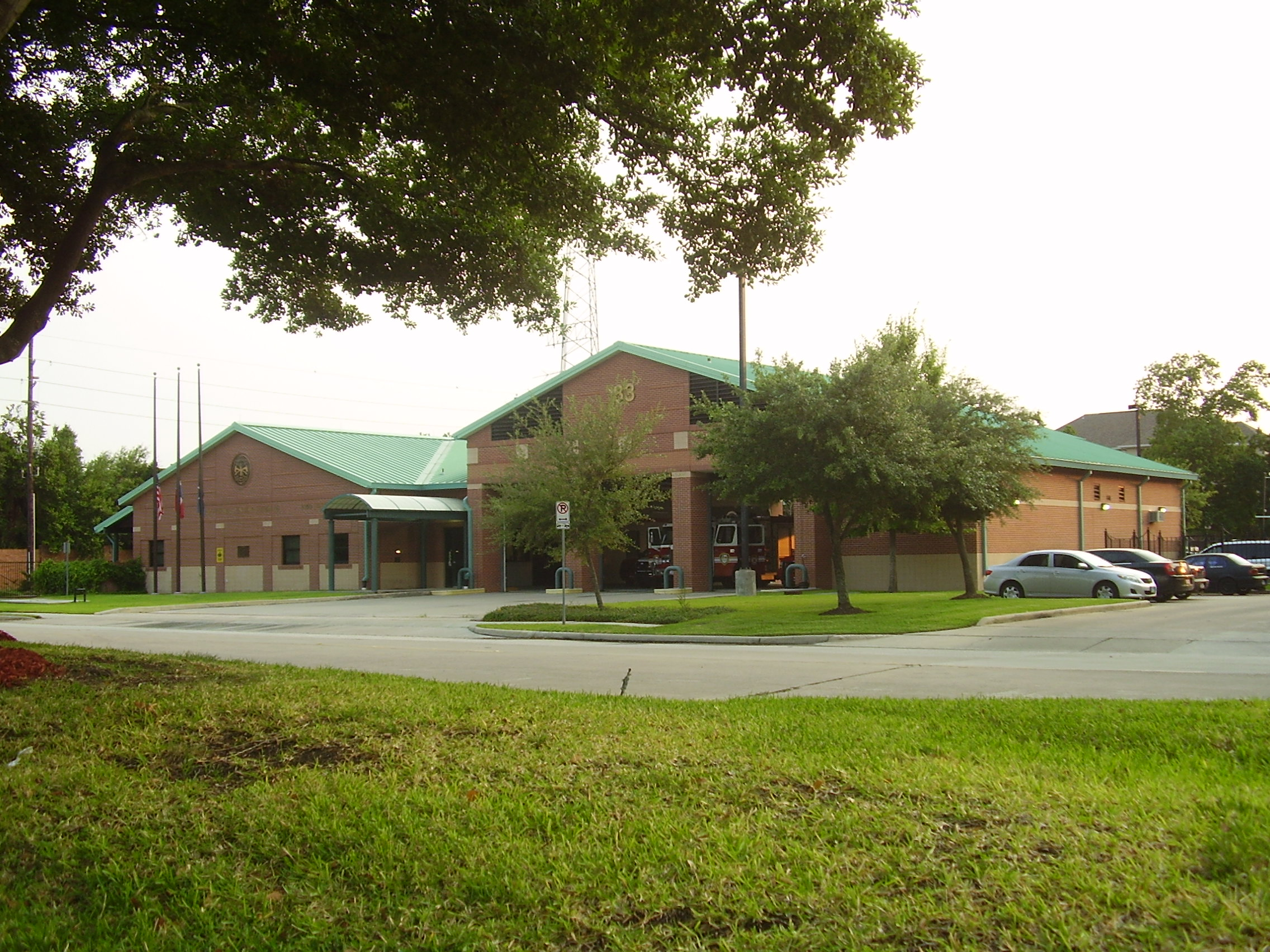
Fire Station 83

The Houston Fire Department operates Fire Station 83 Royal Oaks, a part of Fire District 83. Station 83, a three bay station, has an ambulance, an engine, and a squad; the station houses about nine firefighters per each four-hour shift. The area around what is now Station 83 experienced a wave of construction of high density housing, which stressed the existing emergency infrastructure services. The city responded, holding a groundbreaking for Station 83 on October 8, 2002. The fire department assumed ownership of the station on February 14, 2005. On March 2, 2005 firefighters moved into the station. On June 1, 2005 ribbon-cutting ceremony was held.

Houston City Council District F covers Royal Oaks Country Club.

== Education ==
=== Public schools ===
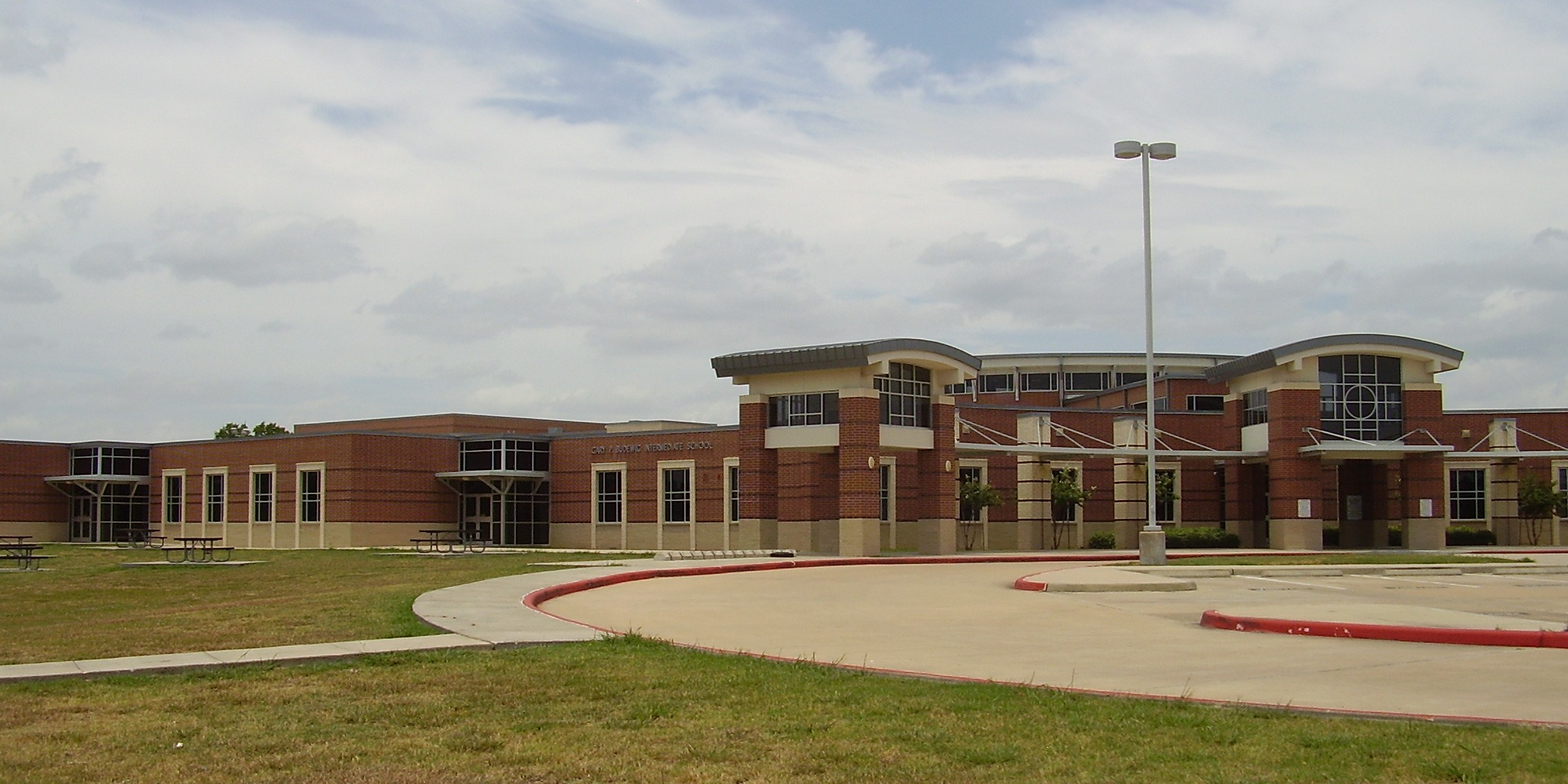
Budewig Intermediate School

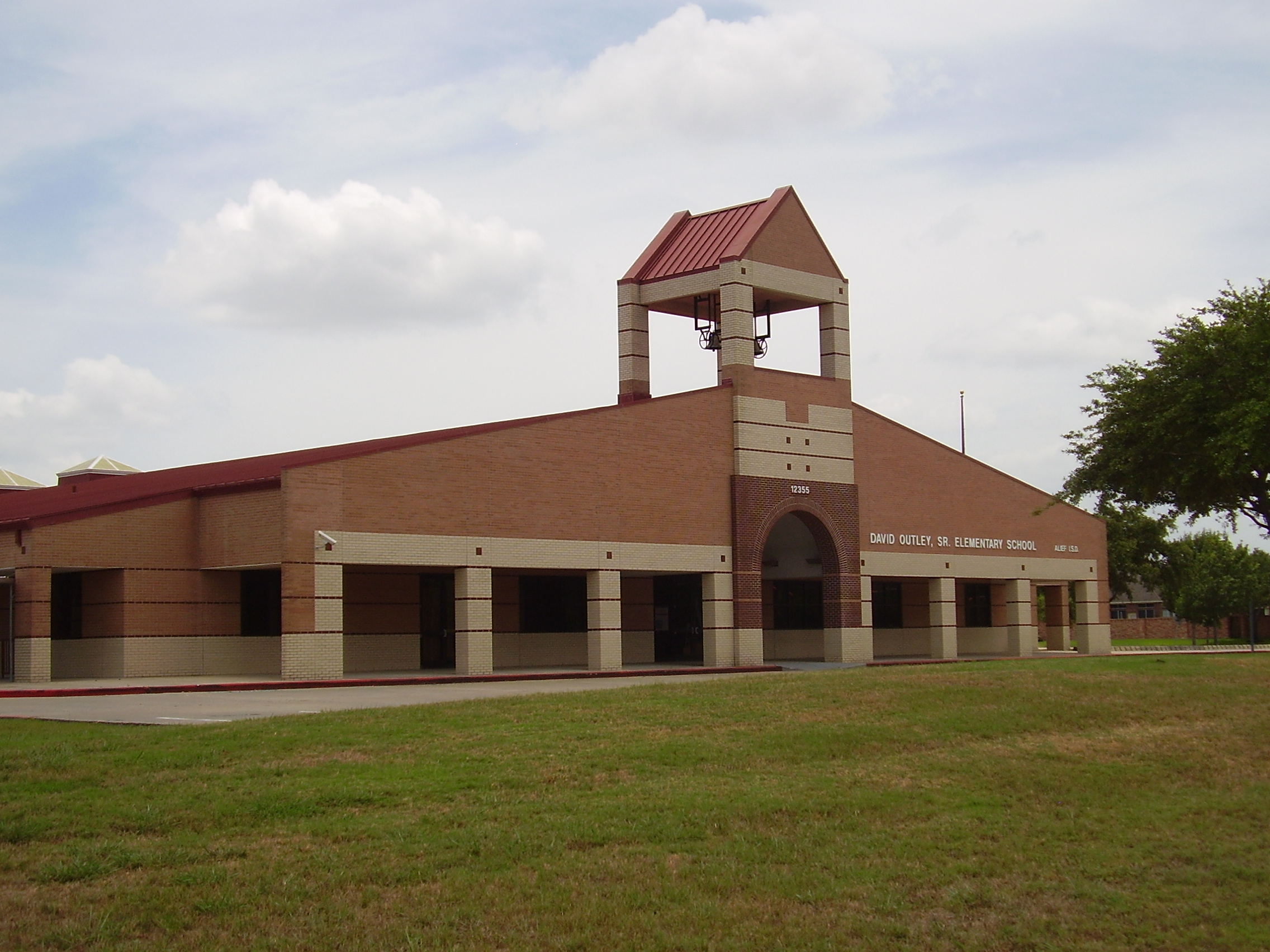
Outley Elementary School

Families are zoned to schools in the Alief Independent School District. In 2008 John Hansen, an Alief ISD board member and a resident of Royal Oaks Country Club, stated that Royal Oaks was "by far the most expensive real estate in the Alief school district and very few of the children attend Alief ISD schools."

Residents are zoned to:

- Outley Elementary School, with bilingual students zoned to Youens Elementary School.
- Budewig Intermediate School, for regular and bilingual students - The 115,849-square-foot (10,762.7 m^{2}) school is named after a firefighter at Fire Station 76, who is an alumnus of Alief Hastings. The cost to build the school was $12,500,000.
- O'Donnell Middle School

All Alief ISD residents are assigned high schools through a lottery. Outcomes include Elsik, Hastings, and Taylor. The district also maintains two magnet schools, Kerr High School and Alief Early College High School.

In 2008 the Alief ISD proposed raising the property tax rate to $1.34 per $100 appraised value, 7.5 cents above the rate for 2007, with an election scheduled for November 20, 2008. A group of homeowners in Royal Oaks named Property Tax Votes Alief Area campaigned against the increase.

=== Private schools ===
As of 2019 The Village School in the Energy Corridor area has a bus service to Royal Oaks Country Club.

=== Colleges and universities ===
The area is a part of the Houston Community College district. Betty L. Martin of the Houston Chronicle wrote that Alief ISD voters had "overwhelmingly" approved the annexation of HCC into the tax base. The Property Tax Votes Alief Area group has protested that proposal on November 4, 2008.

== Parks and recreation ==
The community hosts a 7,033-yard (6,431 m), par-72 Fred Couples signature golf course. In addition it houses a 45,000 square feet (4,200 m^{2}) clubhouse, a sports club and spa complex, a tennis complex, an aquatic center, and a restaurant. The club and spa complex includes another 11,000 square feet (1,000 m^{2}) clubhouse.

== Gallery ==
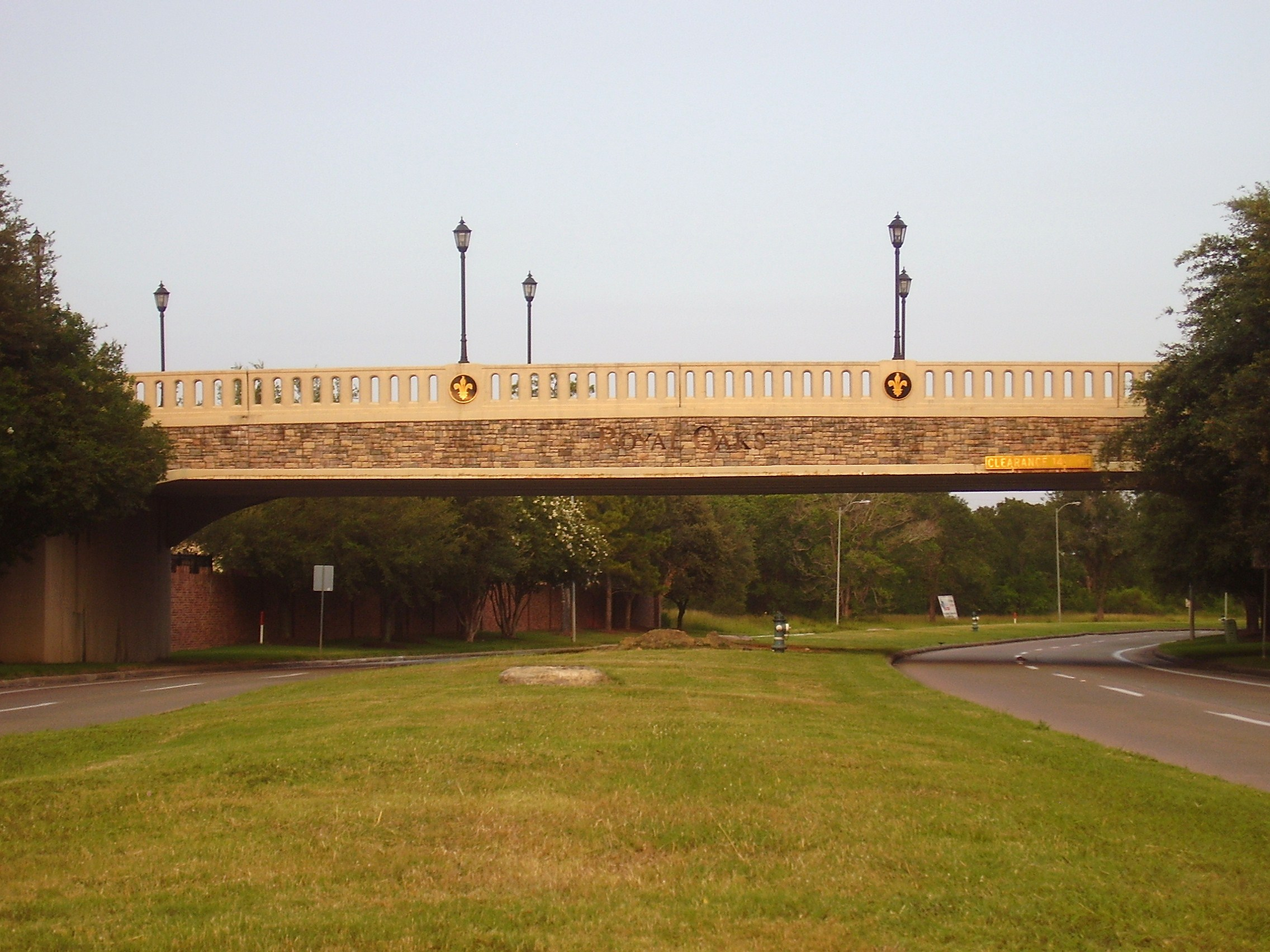
Royal Oaks bridge

== See also ==
- Alief, Houston
- Alief Independent School District
- Energy Corridor, Houston
- Westchase, Houston
- River Oaks Country Club
- Houston Country Club
