= International District (Greater Houston) =

Neighborhood of Houston, Texas

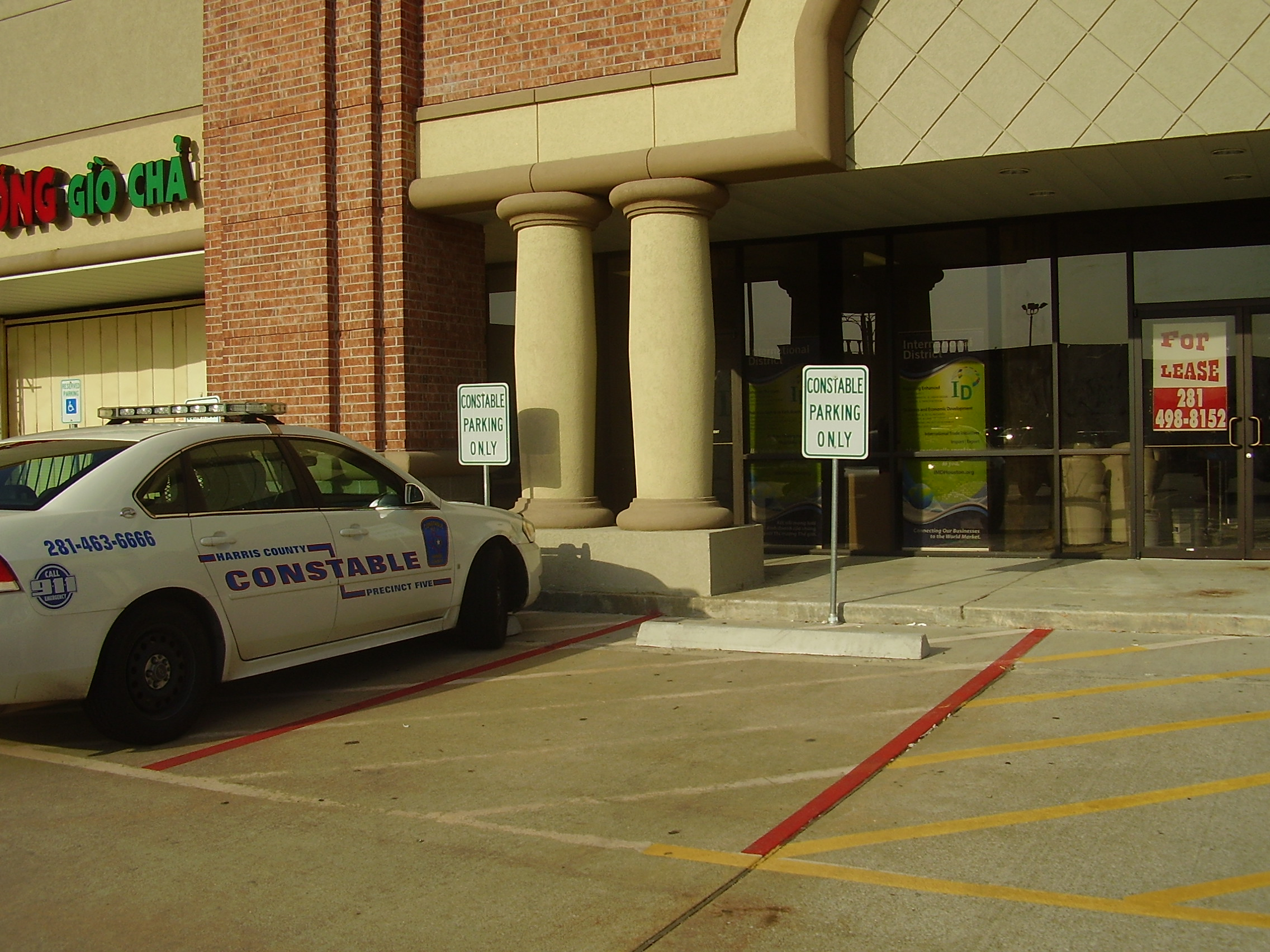
District offices

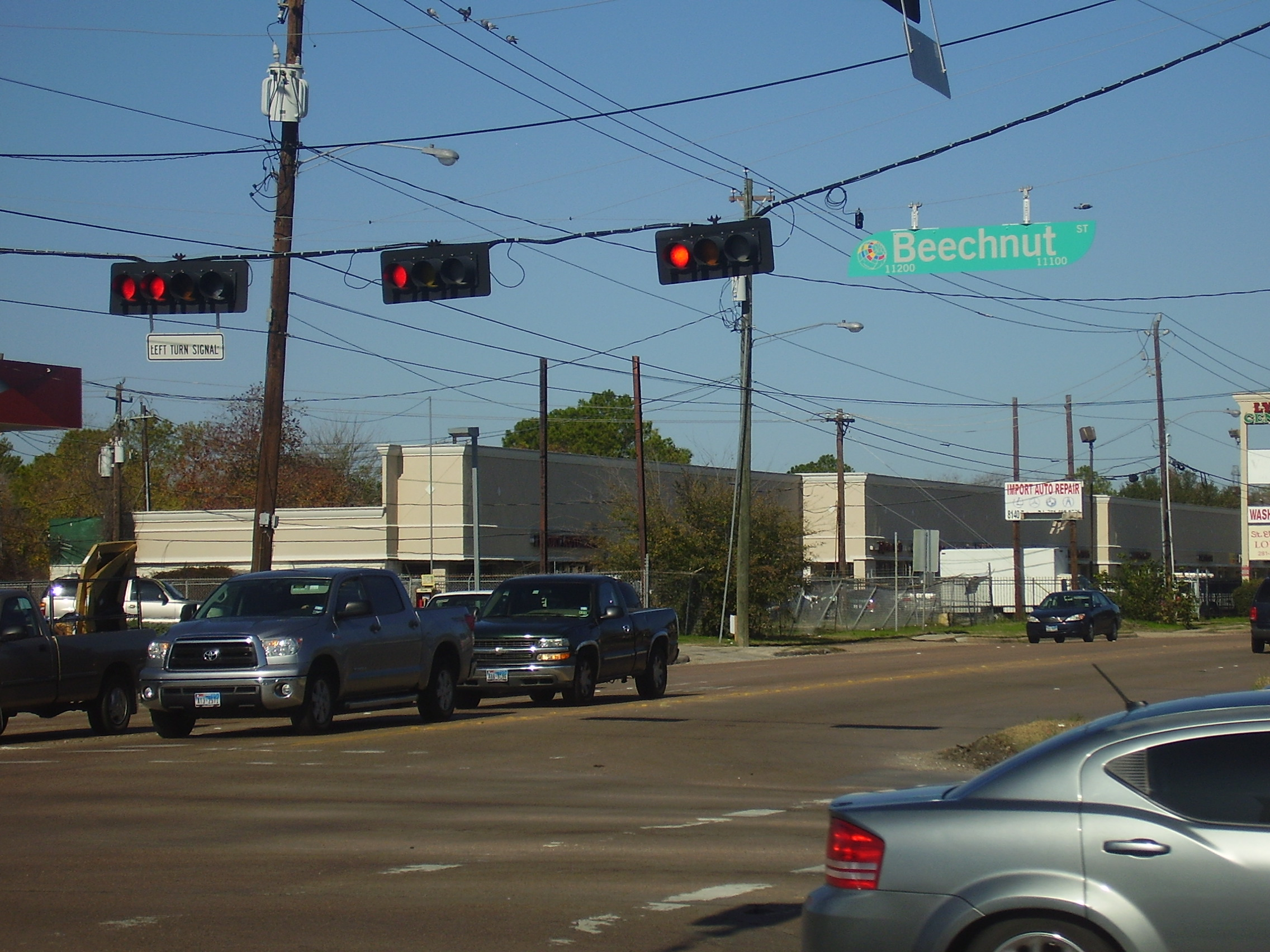
District street scene

The International Management District (IMD) or simply the International District (ID) is a management district in Harris County and Fort Bend County, Texas. Most of the district is within the city of Houston, while a portion lies within an unincorporated area.

== History ==
Texas State Representative Hubert Vo suggested the creation of a management district. The 80th session of the Texas Legislature created the district in 2007. In 2009 the district stated that at least half of its $1 million budget would be used to enhance security.

== Cityscape ==
The district has about 12 square miles (31 km^{2}) of land. It is roughly bounded by Bellaire Boulevard to the north, Texas State Highway 6 to the west, and Beltway 8 to the east. The district runs along Bissonnet from Highway 6 to Kirkwood. The district then runs along West Bellfort to U.S. Highway 59. The area occupied by the district is commonly known as Alief. As of 2011 seven hotels are located in the district.

== Government and infrastructure ==
The International Management District levies taxes on businesses in its boundaries to increase security, to promote international business and trade, and to pay for beautification projects.

=== County, state, and federal representation ===
The Harris County Sheriff's Office serves the unincorporated Harris County side. It operates the Mission Bend Storefront in the International District. The El Franco Lee Health Center in the district, operated by the Harris County Hospital District, opened on May 19, 2009. Prior to the opening, the closest facility was the People's Health Center. The district said in a 2006 Houston Chronicle article that it planned to build a health care facility in Alief. The center has 66,000 square feet (6,100 m^{2}) of space.

The United States Postal Service operates the Alief Post Office and the Beechnut Post Office.

== Economy ==
The International Trade Center-Houston was established around the time of the formation of the International District.

The offices of Sentai Filmworks are in the International District.

== Education ==
=== Primary and secondary schools ===
The Harris County residents are within the Alief Independent School District. The Fort Bend County residents are within the Fort Bend Independent School District. Christina Autry of the IMD wrote that "The International Management District (IMD) largely overlaps with Alief ISD".

Alief ISD schools in the district boundaries include:

- High schools: Alief Kerr High School and Alief Taylor High School
- 9th grade centers: Elsik Ninth Grade School and Hastings Ninth Grade School (the main grade 10–12 buildings are outside of the district, but are parts of the same institutions)
- Middle schools: Killough, O'Donnell, and Olle
- Intermediate schools: Klentzman, Owens, and Youngblood
- Elementary schools: Alexander, Boone, Chambers, Cummings, Hearne, Hicks, Horn, Landis, Liestman, Martin, and Smith

Each area is assigned to a particular elementary school, with several areas assigned to elementary schools outside of the district. Some schools do not have bilingual programs, so bilingual students for those schools are redirected to other schools. In addition to the intermediate schools above, Alief Intermediate, Budewig, Mata, and Miller serve sections of the district, with bilingual students at Alief Int. being redirected to Owens. In addition to the middle schools above, Alief Middle, Albright, and Holub middle schools serve portions of the district. High school students in Alief ISD are randomly assigned to either Elsik, Hastings, or Taylor, with the same institution for all grade levels, while Kerr and Alief Early College serve as magnet schools.

The Fort Bend County portion is served by Arizona Fleming Elementary School, Hodges Bend Middle School, and George Bush High School.

=== Community colleges ===
The Houston Community College System has served the Alief area since 1982. The HCC Alief Campus, a part of the Southwest College, is in the Westchase area of Houston. The HCC Alief Continuing Education Center is located in an unincorporated area in Harris County adjacent to the International District. In 1982 HCCS expanded classes to Alief Elsik High School. In 2001, HCCS opened the Alief Center on Bissonnet. In 2007, the new Alief Campus in Westchase opened. In 2008, the former Alief Center became the Continuing Education Center.

=== Public libraries ===
Houston Public Library operates the David M. Henington-Alief Regional Library in the district.

== Recreation ==
The Lunar New Year is celebrated in the district.
