= Barker, Texas =

- Unincorporated community
- Location within the state of Texas Barker (the United States)
- Coordinates: 29°47′4″N 95°41′6″W
- Country: United States
- State: Texas
- County: Harris
- Time zone: UTC−6 (Central (CST))
  - Summer (DST): UTC−5 (CDT)
- ZIP Code: 77413
- Area code: 713
- FIPS code: 48-05624
- GNIS feature ID: 1330040

Barker is an unincorporated community in western Harris County, Texas, United States. It lies along local roads off Interstate 10 and is seventeen miles west of downtown Houston. Its elevation is 102 feet (31 m), and it is located at 29°47′4″N 95°41′6″W (29.7843955, -95.6849469).

Barker was originally built along the Missouri–Kansas–Texas Railroad, which built through the area in 1895; the community was named for Ed Barker, a railroad contractor. The community's first postmaster was appointed in 1898. Although Barker was originally an agricultural community, the area is now primarily residential.

== Government and infrastructure ==
The United States Postal Service operates the Barker Post Office at 211 Baker Road.
