= Alief Independent School District =

School district in Houston, Texas

Location
- 4250 Cook Rd. Houston, Texas ESC Region 4 USA
- Coordinates: 29°42′43″N 95°35′48″W

District information
- Type: Independent school district
- Motto: Preparing Students for Tomorrow -- Caring for Them Today
- Grades: Pre-K through 12
- Established: 1917
- Superintendent: Dr. Anthony Mays (2023--current)
- Schools: 48 (2023-24)
- NCES District ID: 4807830

Students and staff
- Students: 39,474 (2023–2024)
- Teachers: 2,961.60 (on an FTE basis) (2023–2024)
- Staff: 3,120.93 (on an FTE basis) (2023–2024)
- Student–teacher ratio: 13.33 (2023–2024)

Other information
- TEA District Accountability Rating for 2011-12: Recognized
- Website: www.aliefisd.net

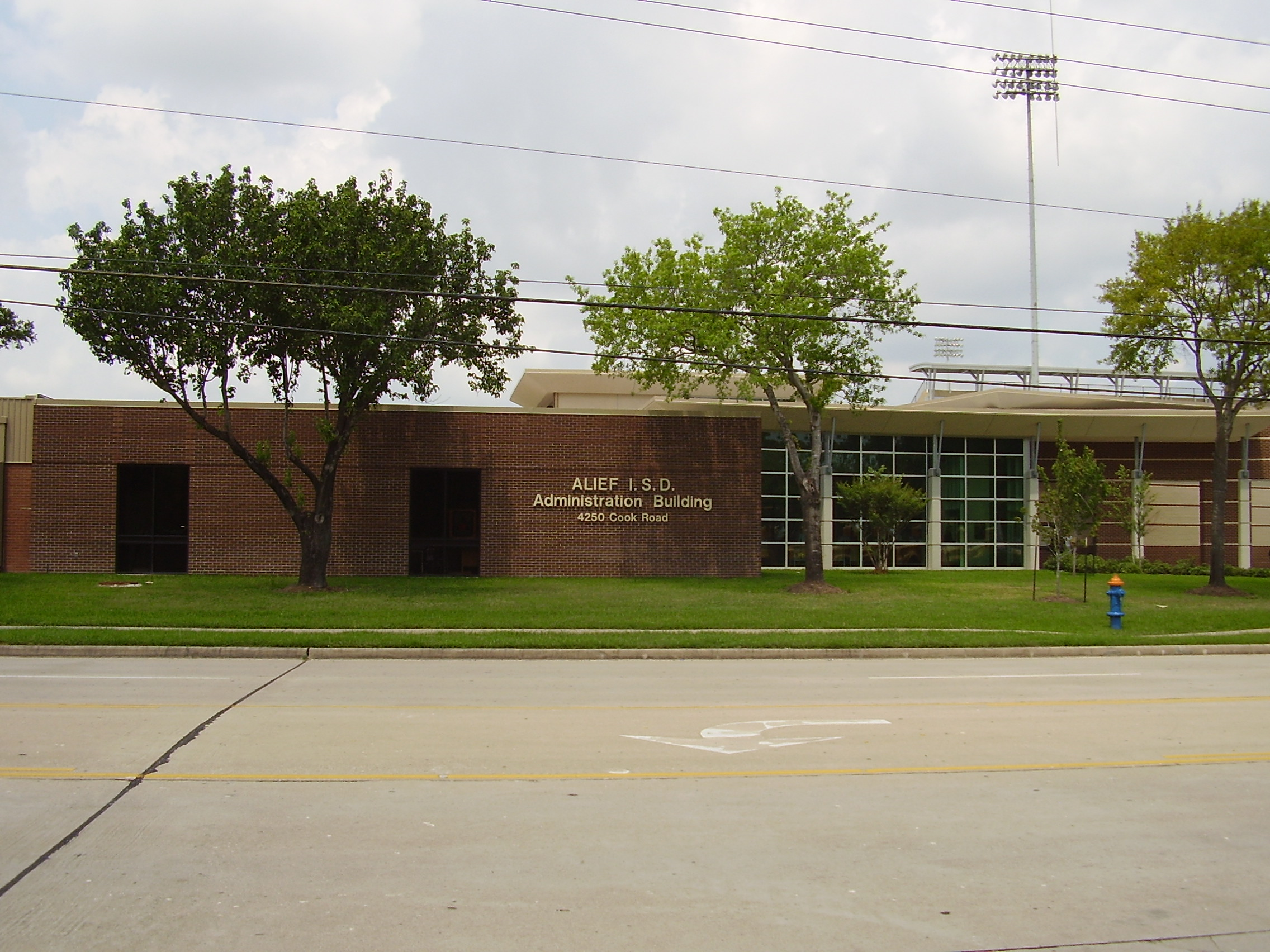
Alief Independent School District headquarters

Alief Independent School District, also known as Alief ISD, is a school district that is based in southwest Houston, Texas, United States. The district is one of the largest school districts in the state and one of the largest school districts in the United States.

Alief ISD, which covers 36.6 square miles (94.8 km^{2}) of land, covers a small portion of southwest Houston and parts of unincorporated Harris County. In Houston, Alief ISD serves the Alief community, almost all of the district of Westchase, Keegan's Glen, Leawood, Ashford Park, Bellaire West, Royal Oaks Country Club, Sharpstown, and the Southwest Management District. It also serves a small portion of Brays Oaks. In unincorporated Harris County, Alief ISD serves Wingate, portions of the Mission Bend CDP, and Enclave Crescent Park Village. The Alief ISD area is a part of the Houston City College System tax base.

== History ==
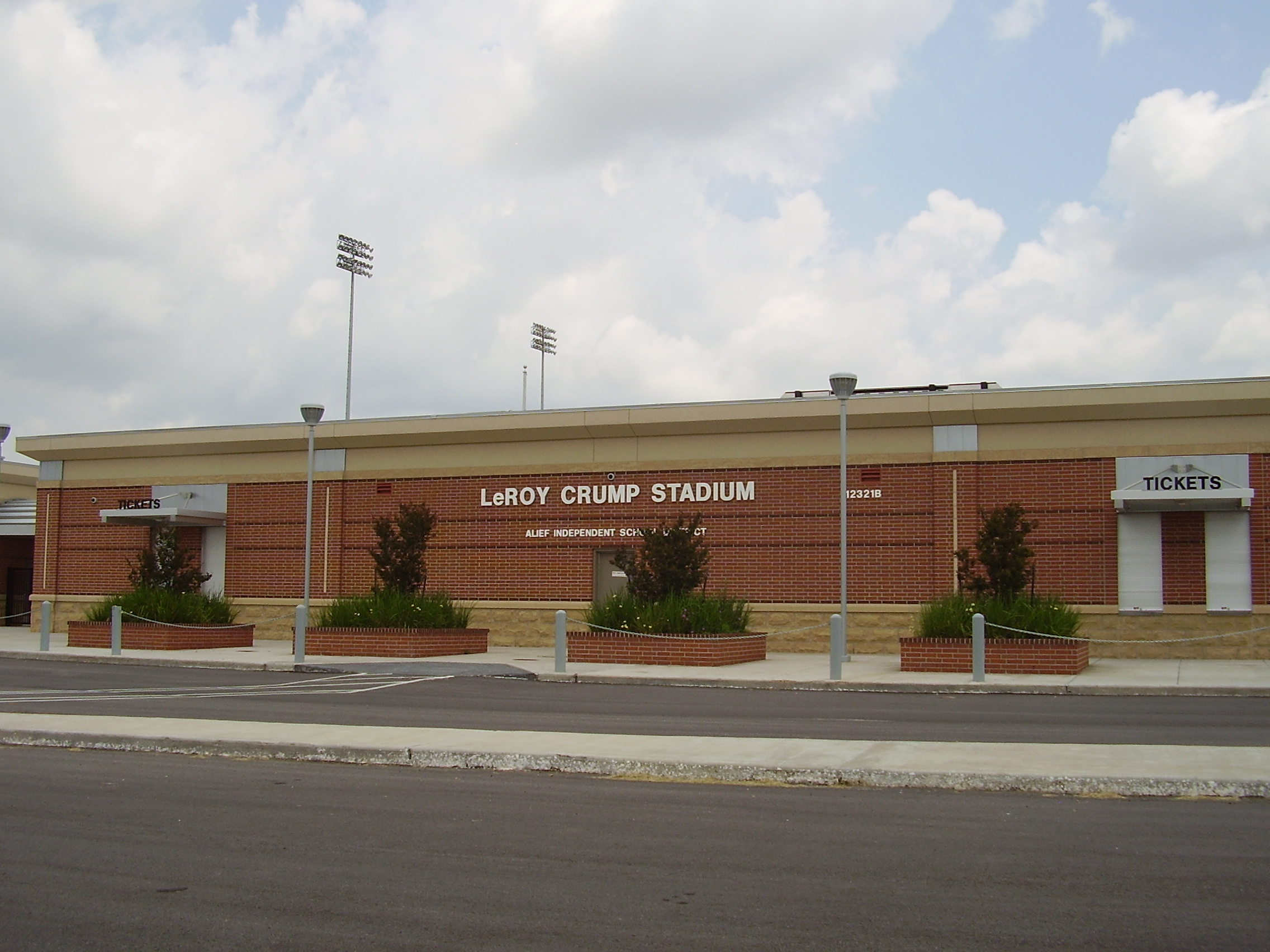
LeRoy Crump Stadium

In 1894, Jacamiah Seaman Daughtery founded the town of Dairy. Until 1906, Addicks, Barker, and Dairy constituted a single School District. From 1906 to 1917, Alief was a Common School District known as Dairy School District #46. In 1917, the district was renamed Alief (since the community was renamed after Alief Ozelda Magee, its postmistress). Alief had only one school until a separate elementary school, Alief Elementary School (now Youens Elementary School), was built in 1964. Bonds passed in the 1960s caused the first modern campuses to open.

In 2011 the Brays Oaks district expanded. A small portion of Alief ISD became a part of the district.

== Governance ==
The district offers prekindergarten to children meeting set criteria. To qualify for enrollment in a prekindergarten program, children must be 4 years old by the district's cut-off date. Children also must be either unable to speak or comprehend English or come from families which have a household income at or below the subsistence level as defined by the State Board of Education. Students between the ages of 5 years old and 21 may attend kindergarten through twelfth grade in the district. In addition, students who are between the ages of 21 and 26 may attend high school in the district to complete their high school diploma requirements.

== Finances ==
As of the 2010–2011 school year, the appraised valuation of property in the district was $10,678,843,000. The maintenance tax rate was $0.113 and the bond tax rate was $0.022 per $100 of appraised valuation.

As of the 2022–23 school year, the appraised valuation of property in the district was $212,366,606. The maintenance tax rate was $0.9561 and the total operating financial sources for bonds and assets were $80,981,948.

== Academic achievement and recognitions ==
In 2011, the school district was rated "recognized" by the Texas Education Agency. Thirty-five percent of districts in Texas in 2011 received the same rating. No state accountability ratings will be given to districts in 2012. A school district in Texas can receive one of four possible rankings from the Texas Education Agency: Exemplary (the highest possible ranking), Recognized, Academically Acceptable, and Academically Unacceptable (the lowest possible ranking).

Historical district TEA accountability ratings

- 2017: Exemplary
- 2016: Exemplary
- 2011: Recognized
- 2010: Recognized
- 2009: Academically Acceptable
- 2008: Academically Acceptable
- 2007: Academically Acceptable
- 2006: Academically Acceptable
- 2005: Academically Acceptable
- 2004: Academically Acceptable

Alief ISD has been named one of the top 830 districts that nationally received the National Award for Music Education in its fine arts education. The district was named a District of Distinction by The Texas Art Education Association for the fifth consecutive year.

== School uniforms ==
Students in elementary, intermediate, and middle schools are required to wear school uniforms.

== List of schools ==
Grades K–4 are considered to be elementary school, 5–6 intermediate school, 7–8 middle school, and 9–12 high school. Each house in the district is assigned to an elementary school, an intermediate school, and a middle school. Alief ISD has an alternative elementary zoning boundary set for bilingual students, as some Alief ISD elementary schools do not offer bilingual programs.

High school attendance is chosen by a computer lottery, which can result in the student going to Alief Elsik High School, Alief Hastings High School or Alief Taylor High School. High school students may apply to attend Alief Kerr High School, a magnet school, or they can apply to the newest school Alief Early College High School, which in combination with HCC, provides students the chance to get their associate degree at the same time as their diploma.

The newly Alief ISD Center for Advanced Careers building, which is also known as the Marshall Center for Advanced Careers, is for high school students who are assigned to Hastings, Elsik and Taylor offers students the tools to achieve the level of their academic careers based on their career cluster. The center offers courses in architectural design, automotive technology, engineering design, construction technology, culinary arts, digital design, health science, industrial robotics, IT, veterinary science and welding and more to choose from.

=== Secondary schools ===
==== 6–12 ====
- The Young Women's Leadership School. It is 6th & 7th Grade in its first year but will expand the next few years til it is finally 6\grade 6–12.

==== High schools ====
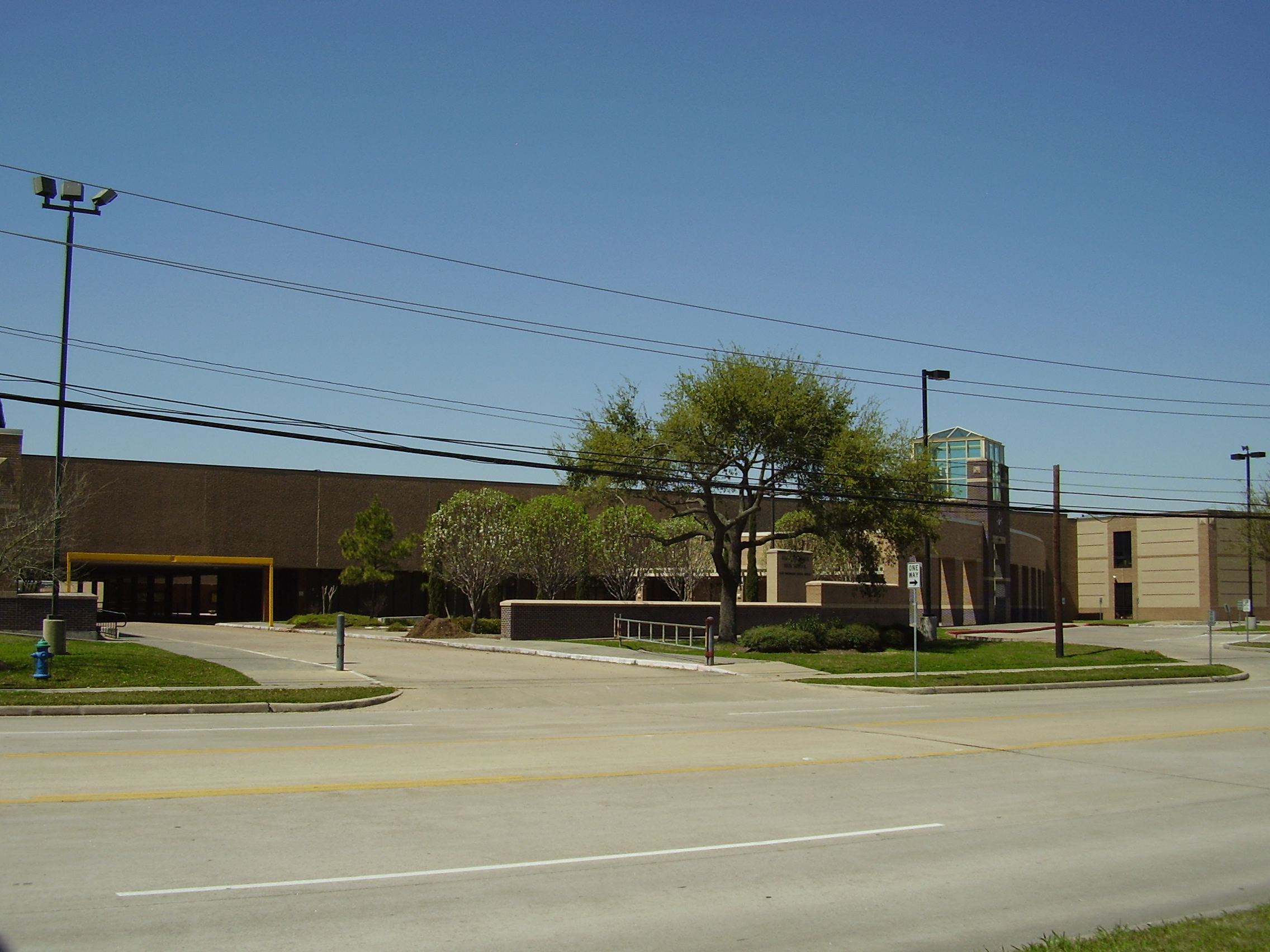
Alief Hastings High School

There are four high schools in Houston and one in unincorporated Harris County, a total of five high schools in the district.

Regular (zoned)

- Alief Elsik High School and Alief Elsik Ninth Grade Center (Houston) (opened 1975)
- Alief Hastings High School and Alief Hastings Ninth Grade Center (Houston) (formerly Alief Junior-Senior High School) (opened 1972)
- Alief Taylor High School (unincorporated area) (opened 2001)

Magnet

- Alief Early College High School (Houston, opened fall 2009)
- Alief Kerr High School (Houston) (opened 1994)
  - National Blue Ribbon School in 2010–2011
  - National Blue Ribbon School in 2016

==== Middle schools ====
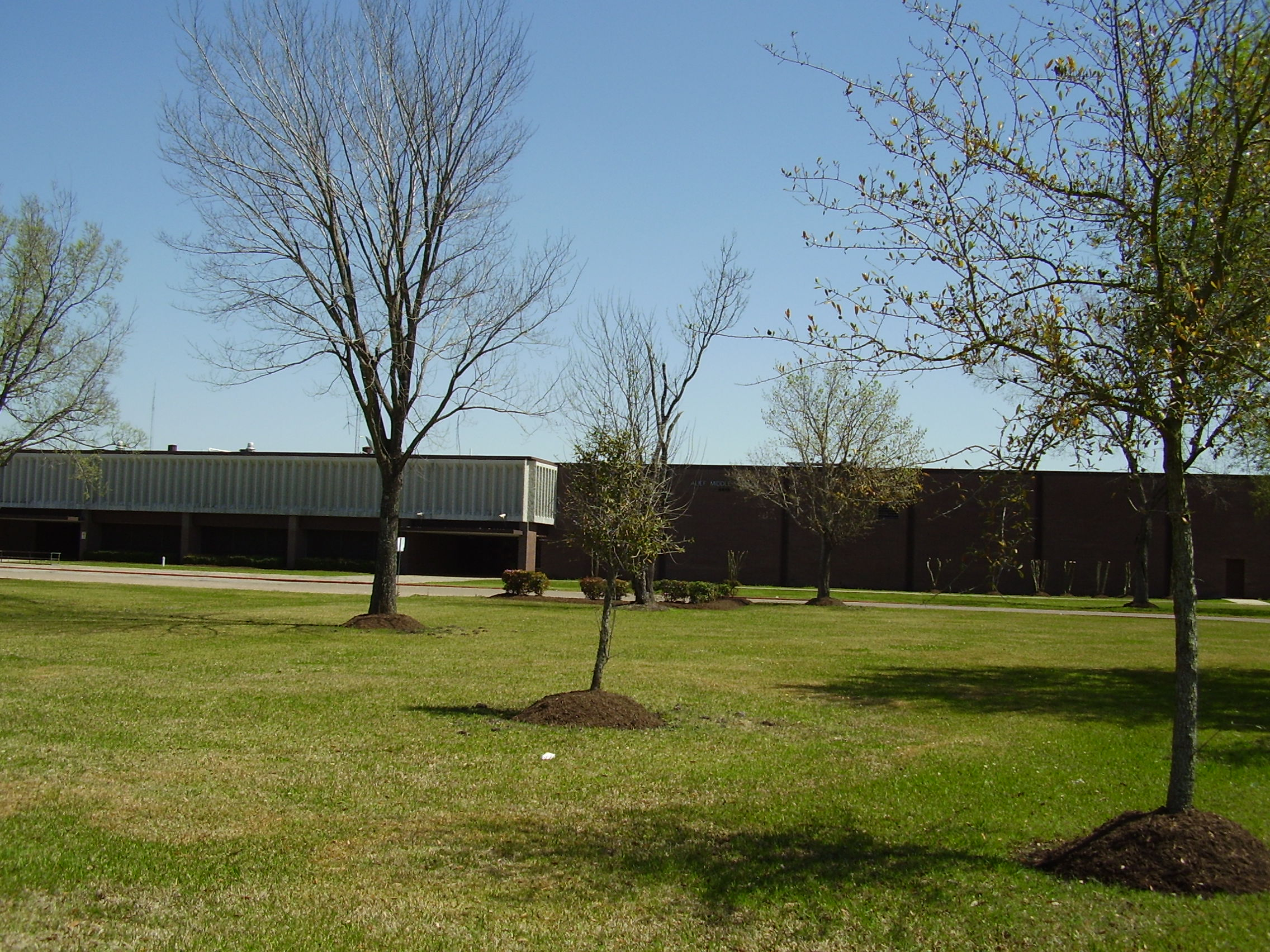
Alief Middle School

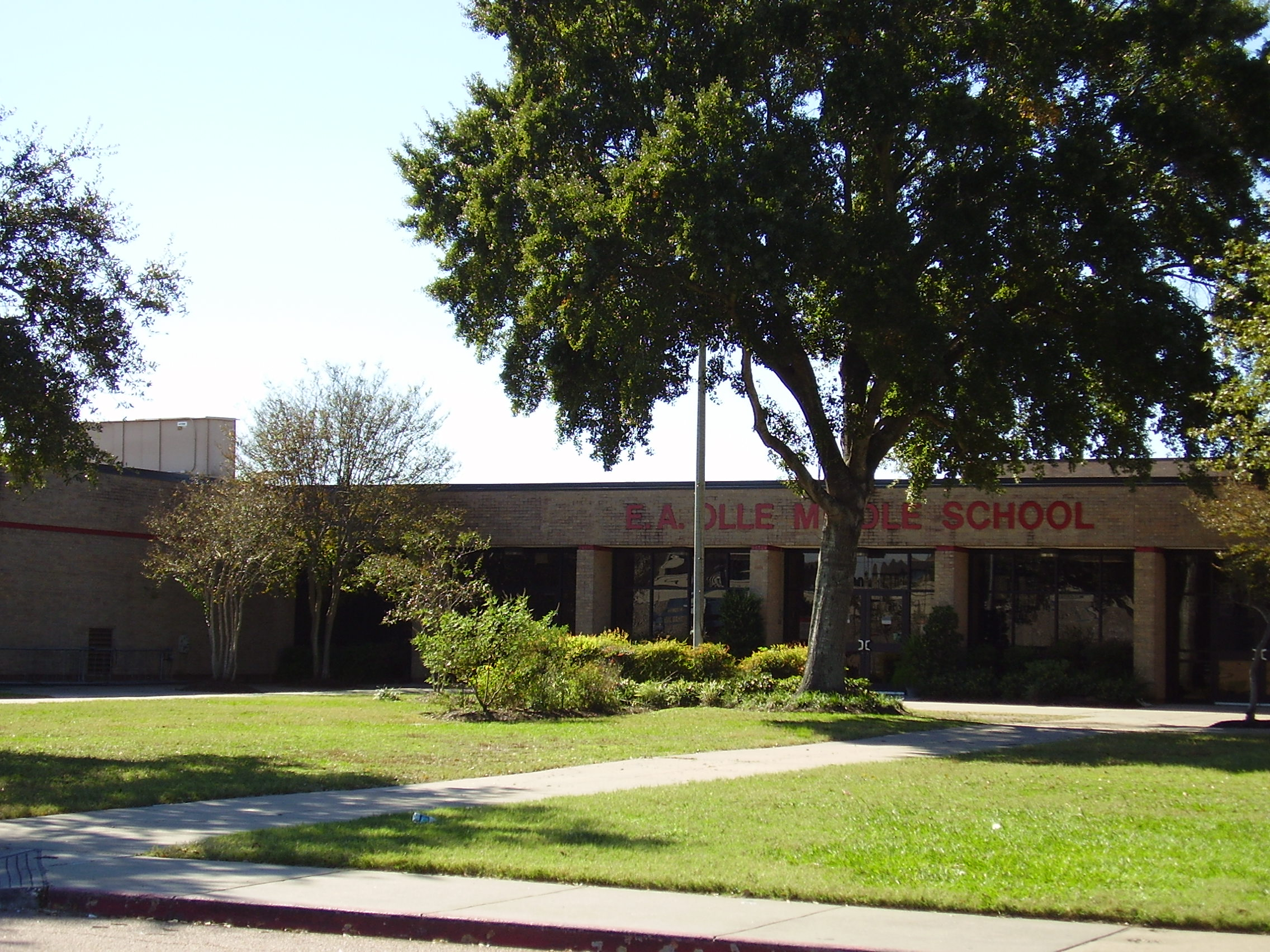
Olle Middle School

There are 4 middle schools in Houston and 2 in unincorporated Harris County, a total of 6 middle schools in the district.

- Jack Albright Middle School (unincorporated area) (opened 1983)

Located on the corner of Winkleman Drive and Alief Clodine, west of Hwy. 6 in Harris County, the school is named for Dr. Jack Albright, a local United Methodist minister, because of his commitment to the community and to education. The school serves students in grades 7 and 8. Its mascot is Warriors, colors are Green, Gold, & Red and its slogan is "Albright Warriors never rest until they are the best." On May 14, 2002 Falcon Construction Group was awarded a contract to add ten classrooms under the design of Dansby & Miller Architects.

- Alief Middle School (Houston) (opened 1968)
- James Holub Middle School (Houston)
  - National Blue Ribbon School in 1999-2000
- Killough Middle School (Houston)
- O'Donnell Middle School (unincorporated area) (opened 1993)
- E. A. Olle Middle School (Houston)
  - National Blue Ribbon School in 1990-91

=== Primary schools ===
==== Intermediate schools ====
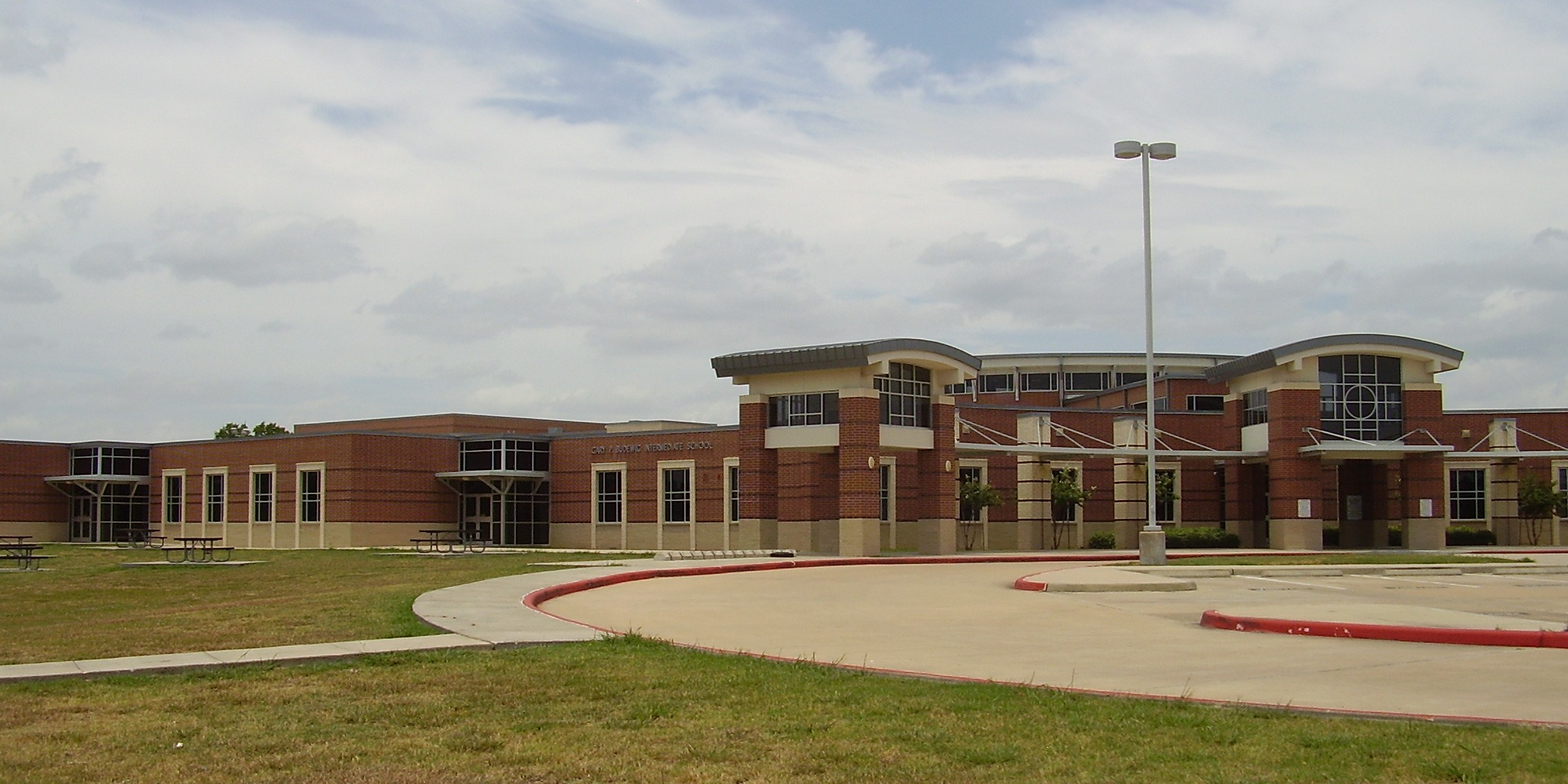
Budewig Intermediate School

There are 5 intermediate schools in Houston and 1 in unincorporated Harris County, a total of 6 intermediate schools in the district.

- Gary P. Budewig Intermediate School (Houston) (opened 2003)
  - The 115,849-square-foot (10,762.7 m^{2}) school is named after a firefighter at Fire Station 76, who is an alumnus of Alief Hastings. The cost to build the school was $12,500,000.
- Ivena C. Klentzman Intermediate School (Houston) (opened 1995)
- Helen Mata Intermediate School (Houston) (opened 1999)
- Judith G. Miller Intermediate School (unincorporated area) (opened 2000)
- L. C. Owens Intermediate School (Houston) (opened April 15, 1994)
- J. W. Youngblood Intermediate School (Houston) (opened 1994)

==== Elementary schools ====
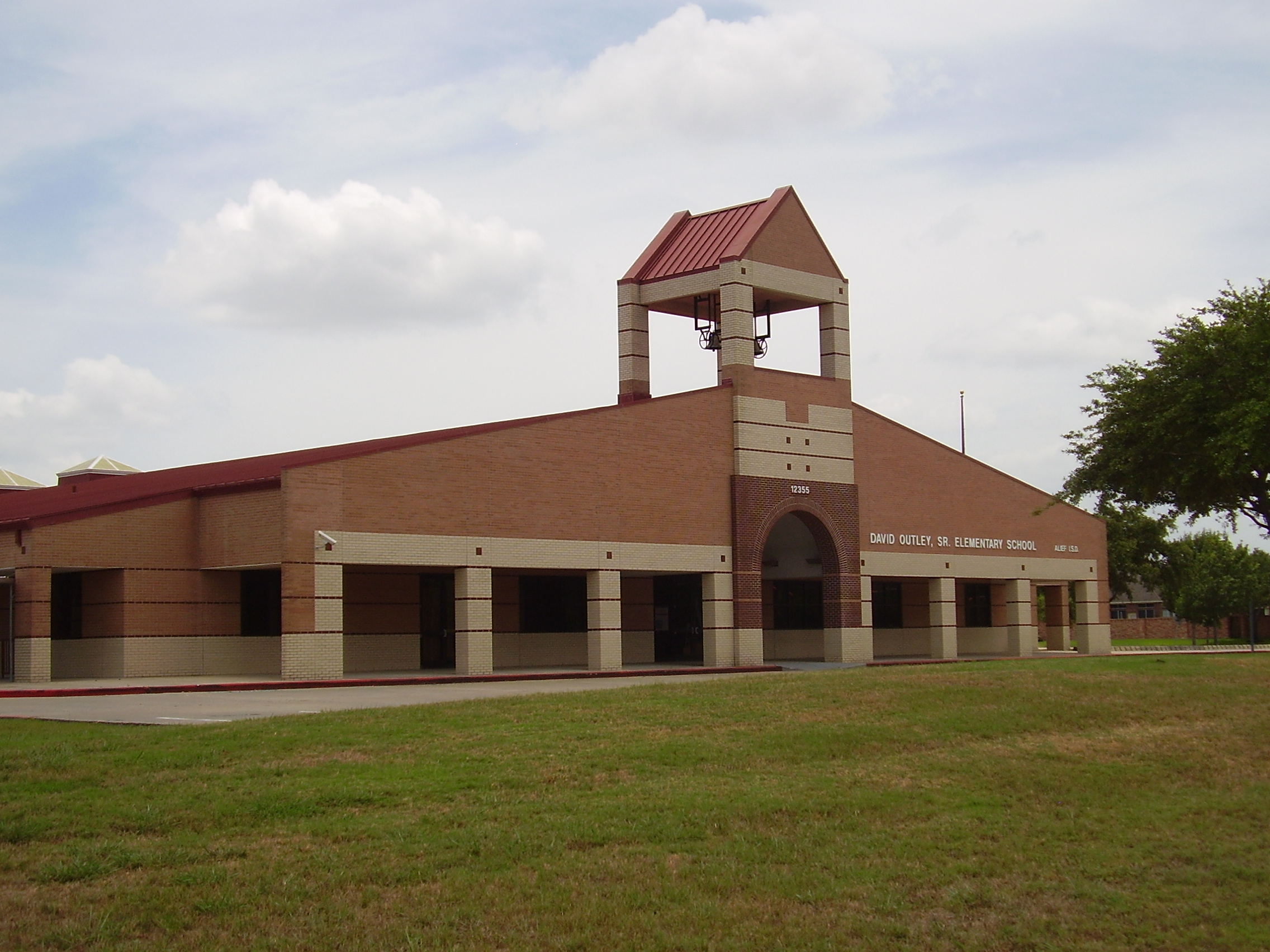
Outley Elementary School

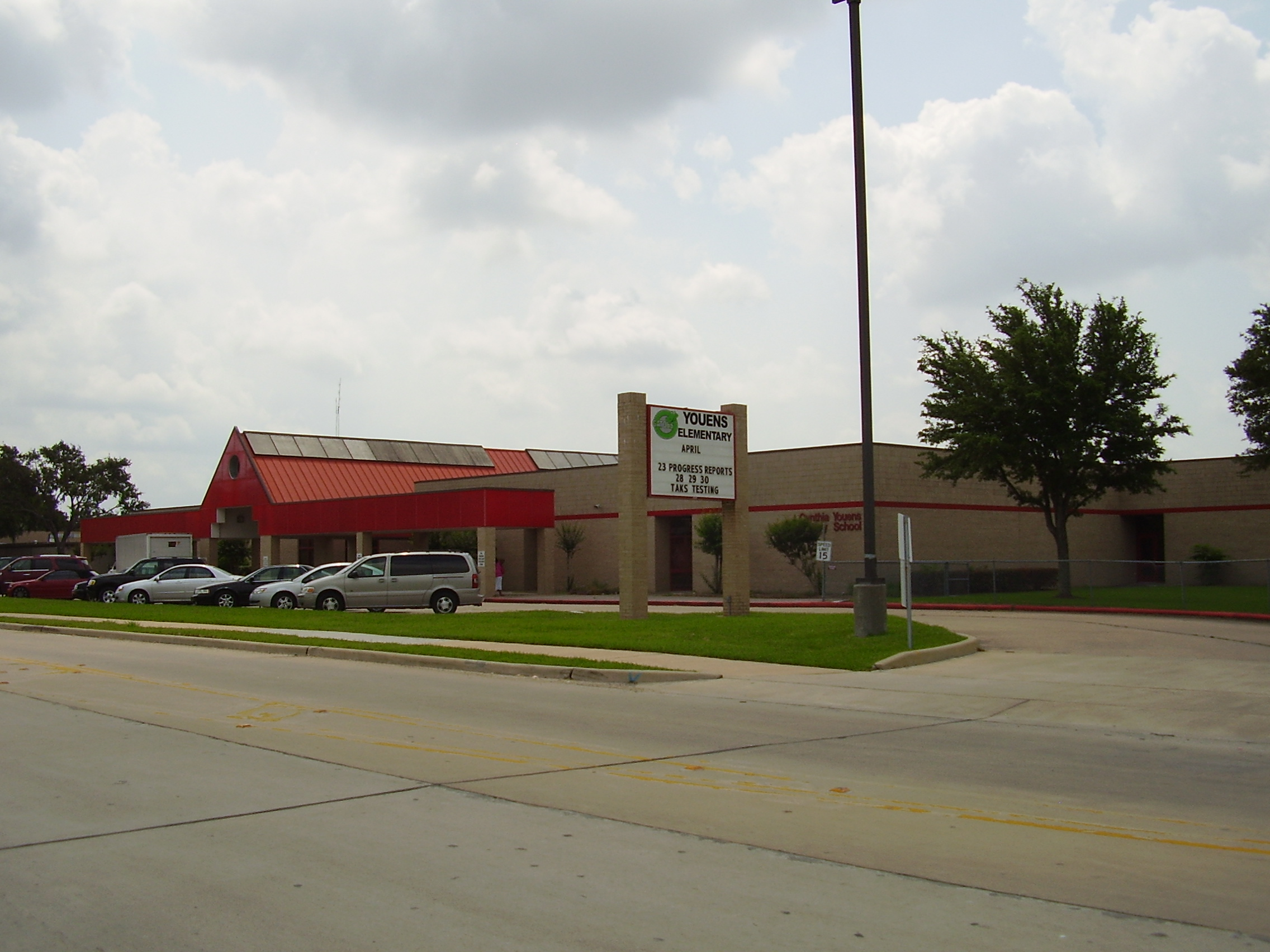
Youens Elementary School

The district has 20 elementary schools in Houston and 5 in unincorporated Harris County, for a total of 25 elementary schools.

- Deborah Brown Alexander Elementary School (Houston) (opened 1984)
- Betty Roberts Best Elementary School (Houston) (opened 1991)
- Sylvester B. Boone Elementary School (Houston) (opened February 1, 1969)
- Audrey Judy Bush Elementary School (Houston) (opened 1997)
- Velma G. Chambers Elementary School (Houston)
- Chancellor Elementary School (Houston, bilingual students zoned to Chancellor go to Youens ES) (opened 1978)
- Margaret Collins Elementary School (Houston) (opened 1999)
- Cummings Elementary School (Houston, bilingual students zoned to Cummings go to Kennedy ES)
- Charlette Taylor Hearne Elementary School (Unincorporated area) (opened 1987)
- Talmadge Heflin Elementary School (Houston, bilingual students zoned to Heflin go to Hearne ES) (opened 1982)
- Howard J. Hicks Elementary School (Unincorporated area) (opened 1996)
- David Kent Holmquist Elementary School (Unincorporated area, (opened Fall 2007))
- Gladys Birdwell Horn Elementary School (Houston) (opened 2005)
- Michael Kennedy Elementary School (Houston) (opened 1975)
  - National Blue Ribbon School in 1996-97
- Mildred Rickard Landis Elementary School (Houston) (opened 1989)
- Liestman Elementary School (Houston)
- Viola Mahanay Elementary School (Houston, bilingual students zoned to Mahanay go to Hearne ES)
- A. J. Martin Elementary School (Houston) (opened 1970)
- David Outley Sr. Elementary School (Houston, bilingual students zoned to Outley go to Youens ES) (opened 1993)
- Willard L. Petrosky Elementary School (Unincorporated, bilingual students zoned to Petrosky go to Rees ES) (opened 1980)
- Flem Rees Elementary School (Unincorporated) (opened 1984)
- Douglas Smith Elementary School (Houston) (opened 1972)
- Ruth Conner Sneed Elementary School (Houston) (opened 1990)
  - Sneed is in Westchase Section 5
- Cynthia Youens Elementary School (Houston, formerly Alief Elementary School) (opened 1964)

=== Alternative schools ===
There is one alternative school in Houston.

- Alief Learning Center (Houston)

=== Early learning centers ===
There are two early learning centers, with a total of 2 early learning centers in the district.

- Maria Del Carmen Martinez Early Learning Center (Houston) (opened 2022)
- Jefferson Early Learning Center (Houston) (opened 2022)

=== Other schools and facilities ===
- William Robert Marshall Center for Advanced Careers (Houston) (opened 2018) Hosts CTE classes for all Alief ISD high school students
- Alief ISD Center for Talent Development(Houston) (opened 2021)

== Facilities ==
In addition to school campuses, the district has several other facilities for students, staff, and administrators. The Leroy Crump Stadium is home to many athletic events. The Steven Lloyd Ness Natatorium, located on High Star across the street from the Hastings and Elsik campus, houses the district's swimming pools. The district administration offices are on High Star. The maintenance office and nutrition annex are on High Star as well. The district bus depot is on Synott. The district has its own police force. The police station is located on 12135 1/2 High Star. The police force enforces the district's "Zero Tolerance" policy.

== See also ==
- Alief
- List of school districts in Texas
