= Alief Taylor High School =

Public school in Texas, United States

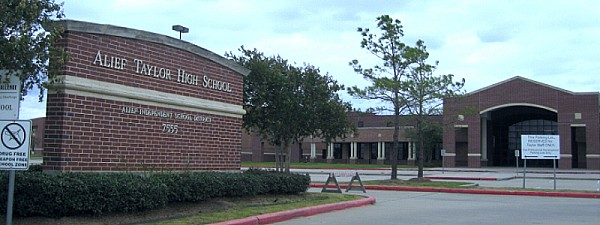
- Front exterior

Location
- 7555 Howell Sugar Land Drive; Houston, TX; 29.695°N 95.633°W

Information
- School type: Public high school
- Motto: "Failure is Not an Option"
- Established: 2001
- School district: Alief Independent School District
- Principal: Mary Williams
- Teaching staff: 170.30 (FTE)
- Grades: 9–12
- Enrollment: 2,856 (2023–2024)
- Student to teacher ratio: 16.77
- Campus: Urban
- Colors: Crimson, navy and white
- Athletics: Baseball, basketball, cross country, cheerleading, football, golf, power lifting, soccer, softball, swimming and diving, tennis, track and field, and volleyball
- Mascot: Leo the Lion
- Team name: Lions
- Rival schools: Alief Hastings High School, Alief Elsik High School, Memorial High School and Katy High School
- Website: Taylor High School

Alief Taylor High School is a public high school in the Alief Independent School District. It is located in an unincorporated area in the Alief community of Harris County, near Houston, Texas, United States. Opened in 2001, Alief Taylor is the newest high school in the district. It is named after Edward "Doc" Taylor, who taught AP American History at Alief Hastings High School.

According to the Texas Education Agency, Taylor covers grades 9-12 and has 500 or more students in each grade level. When it opened in the fall of 2001, it had only freshmen and sophomores. During the 2002–2003 school year the 11th grade was added. Taylor added its first 12th grade class during the 2003–2004 school year. Alief Taylor is one of two schools in Alief ISD that does not include a Ninth Grade Center, a separate building for ninth grade students. The other is Kerr High School. Alief Taylor was originally referred to as "High School No. 4."

It is located in the International District.

In 2022, Taylor received a C rating from the Texas Education Agency.

== History ==
Alief Taylor High School opened on August 13, 2001. The school was initially designated for freshmen and sophomores only, in an attempt to alleviate overcrowding at nearby Elsik and Hastings High Schools which, at the time, had a combined student population of over 9,000. It eventually expanded to accept students from 9th to 12th grades. Unlike Hastings or Elsik, Taylor hosts all grade levels (9-12) on the same campus.

== Academics ==
In the 2016–2017 school year, Taylor High School received a Met Standard rating from the Texas Education Agency. The class of 2015 averaged a score of 18 on the ACT and 1148 on the SAT.

The school was rated Met Standard in 2017–18, received a C rating in 2018–19, was Not Rated in 2019–2020 or 2020–2021, and received a C rating in 2021–2022.

== Athletics ==
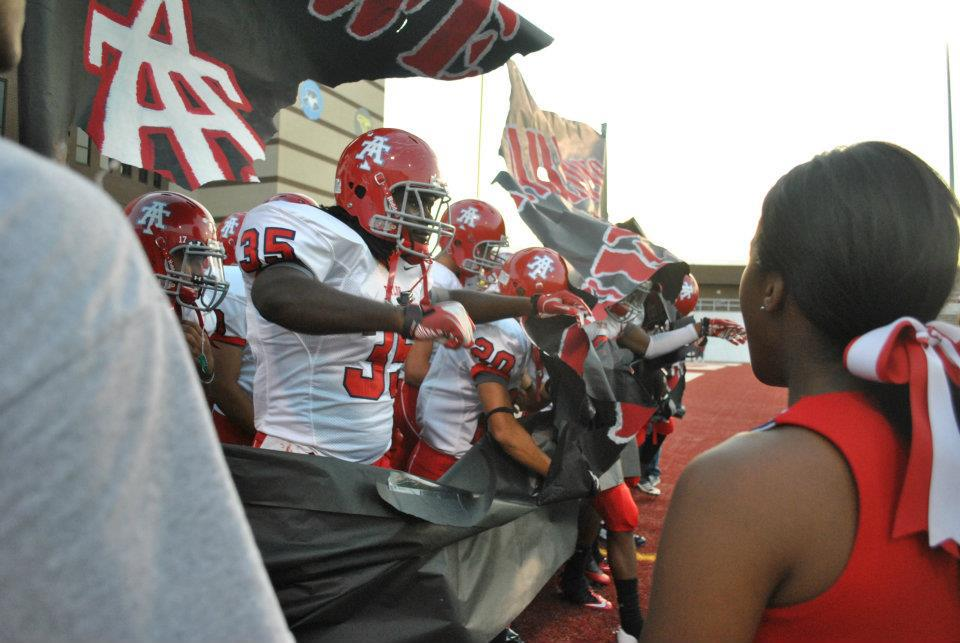
The Alief Taylor football team

Alief Taylor has one state championship, six regional titles, and eight district titles in football, track, cross country, tennis, swimming, and diving.

== Extracurricular activities ==
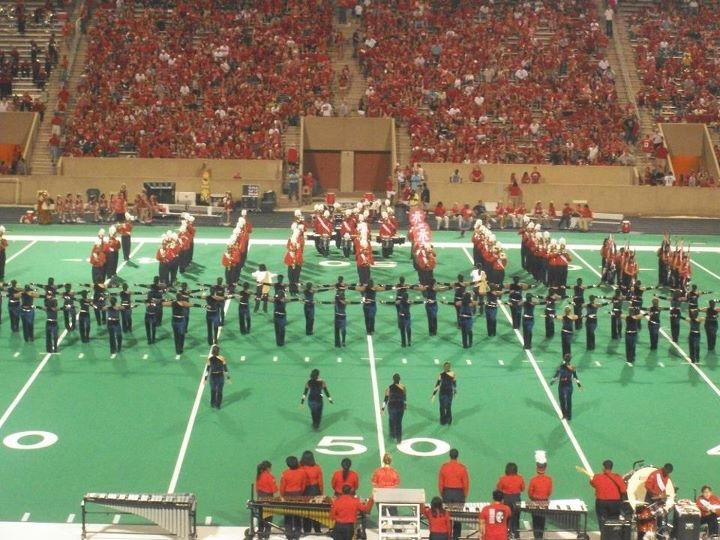
The Alief Taylor Marching Band

Alief Taylor hosts many clubs and organizations for its students, including band, choir, orchestra, drumline, colorguard, cheerleading, dance, theater, student council, speech and debate, math club, academic decathlon, and support groups for male, female, and LGBTQ+ students.

In 2004, the marching band appeared in the film Friday Night Lights, in which they assume the role of the Dallas Carter band.

The Alief Taylor Drumline were the gold medalist recipients of the 2006-07 PSAA TCGC Championship, a state-level competition.

== Demographics ==
In the 2018–2019 school year, there were 3,112 students. 32.8% were African American, 12.2% were Asian, 52.8% were Hispanic, 0.4% were American Indian, 0.1% were Pacific Islander, 1.5% were White, and 0.4% were two or more races. 73.9% of students were economically disadvantaged, 21.1% were English language learners, and 8.6% received special education services.

== Feeder patterns ==
All Alief ISD elementary, intermediate, and middle schools feed into Taylor, as high school placement in Alief ISD is determined by a lottery, which may result in Elsik, Hastings, or Taylor. If a student is selected by lottery to attend a high school different from the high school which a relative currently attends or graduated from, the student may opt to transfer to that school. Students may also complete an application for the district's magnet high school, Kerr, or the recently established Alief Early College High School.

Neighborhoods served by AISD include Alief, most of Westchase, Bellaire West, most of New Chinatown, most of Leawood, Mission Leona, and Mission Bend.

== Notable alumni ==
- Martellus Bennett — NFL player, Super Bowl Champion
- Michael Bennett — NFL player, Super Bowl Champion
- Duke Ejiofor — NFL player
- Trevin Giles — UFC fighter
- Chase Jenkins – college football quarterback
- Joshua Kalu — NFL player
- Ogbonnia Okoronkwo — NFL player, Super Bowl Champion
- Fendi Onobun — NFL player
- Cheta Ozougwu — NFL player
- Givens Price — NFL player
- Michael Tauiliili — American football player
