= Alief Hastings High School =

High school in Houston, Texas

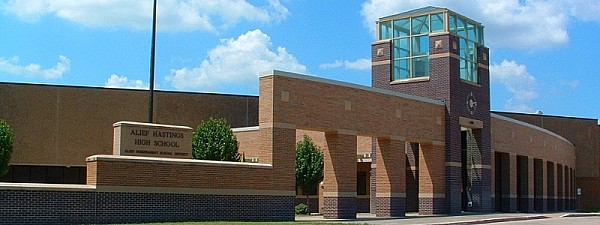
- Front Exterior
- : 4410 Cook Road; Houston, TX 77072-1105; Ninth grade center: 6750 Cook Road; Houston, TX 77072.

Information
- School type: Public high school
- Motto: “Dream! Believe! Achieve!”
- Established: 1972
- School district: Alief Independent School District
- Principal: Dr William Price
- Teaching staff: 277.87 (on an FTE basis)
- Grades: 9-12
- Enrollment: 3,930 (2022-2023)
- Student to teacher ratio: 14.14
- Campus: City: Large
- Colors: Black and gold
- Athletics: Football, basketball, cheerleading, track and field, tennis, golf, baseball, softball, soccer, volleyball, swimming and diving
- Mascot: Fighting Bears
- Team name: Bears
- Yearbook: Bear Tracks
- Rival schools: Alief Taylor High School, Alief Elsik High School
- Website: hastings.aliefisd.net/o/hhs

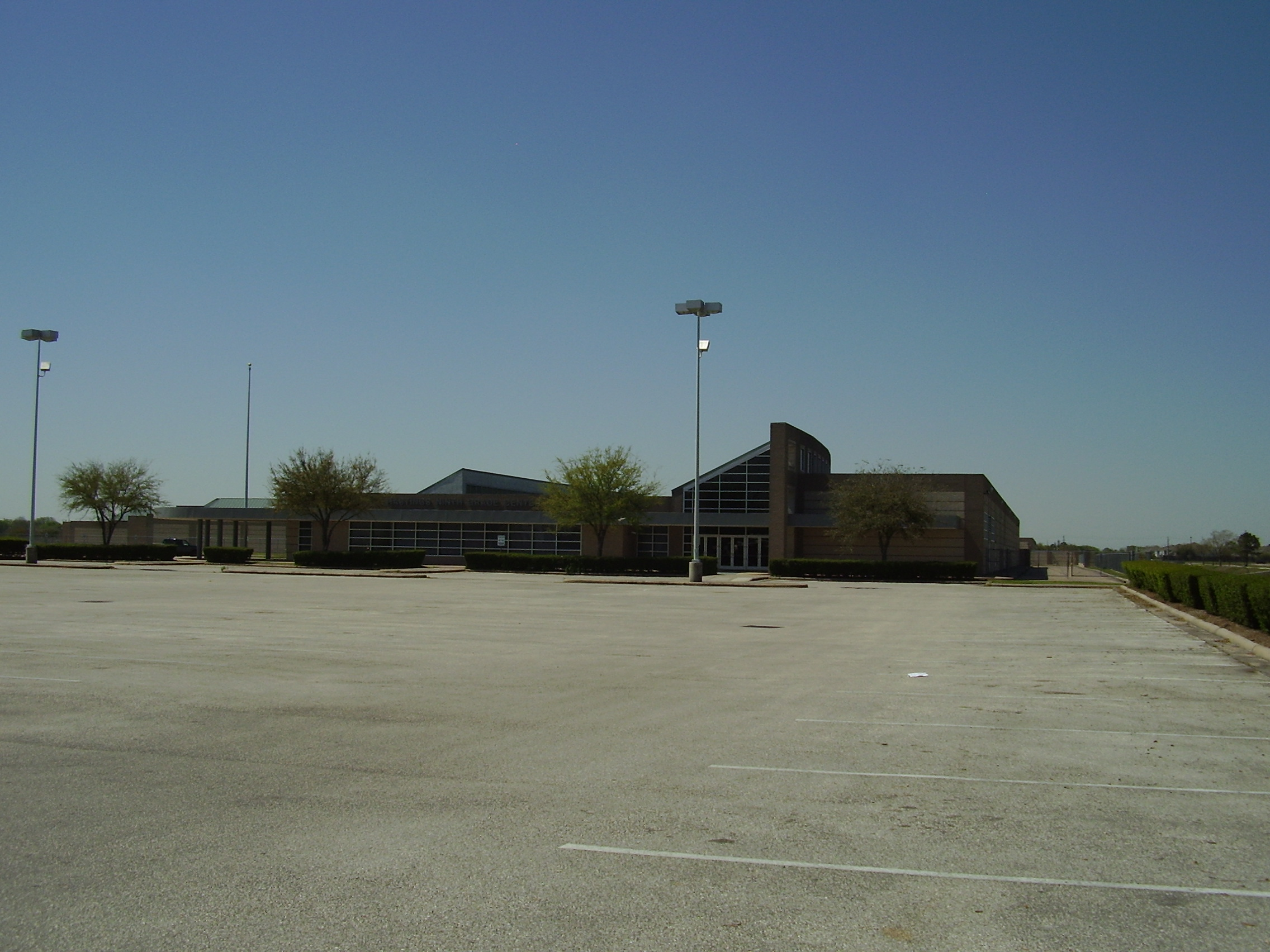
Ninth Grade Center

Alief Hastings High School is a public high school in the Alief area of Houston, Texas, United States. Originally Alief Junior-Senior High School, which became Alief Middle School, housed all of the secondary students in the district. The school's present location opened, while still under construction, for the fall semester of 1972. All high school students moved to that building, with the first graduating class in May 1973.

Alief Hastings is a part of the Alief Independent School District and it serves grades 9 through 12. Ninth-graders are in the Alief Hastings Ninth Grade Center (6750 Cook Road, City of Houston, 77072) while tenth through twelfth graders are on the main campus (4410 Cook Road, City of Houston, 77072). The campuses had a combined enrollment of 4207 students as of the 2002-2003 school year. The opening of Alief Taylor High School reduced the overall class size at Alief Hastings significantly. Alief Hastings is considered to be the brother school of Alief Elsik High School. The two schools enjoy a friendly rivalry that heats up each year in the final football game when they play each other in a shared football stadium.

The ninth grade campus is located in the International District although the main high school building is outside of it.

In 2022, Hastings received a score of 69 out of 100 from the Texas Education Agency. Alief Hastings is one of the largest high schools in the state.

== Campus students ==
Campuses in Houston

All Alief ISD elementary, intermediate, and middle schools feed into Hastings as high school placement in Alief ISD is determined by a computerized lottery: the lottery can result in either Elsik, Hastings, or Taylor. If a student was selected by lottery to attend a high school different from the high school of a relative currently attending or graduated from, the student may opt to transfer to that respective school.

Students may also complete an application for the district's magnet high school, Kerr.

Neighborhoods served by AISD include Alief, most of the New Chinatown, most of Westchase, Bellaire West, and most of Leawood.

Peggy Miller, a teacher, said that when she started being the school's yearbook advisor at Hastings, 18 years prior to 2008, the number of copies of yearbooks sold was 80% of the total number of students. Around 2008, the copies of yearbooks sold was 10-15% that of the total number of students. In 2008 Miller said "They all want them, but it's like, who's got $60? They would rather go buy their tennis shoes or buy a grill for their mouth or something. A book is not as significant today to a child." In 2008 Miller introduced color pages in an effort to entice students to buy more yearbooks.

=== Demographics ===
In the 2023-2024 school year, there were 3,930 students. 1.0% were American Indian, 8.6% were Asian, 26.2% were African American, 60.0% were Hispanic, 0.1% were Pacific Islander, 3.7% were White, and 0.4% were two or more races. 83.1% of students were eligible for free or reduced-price lunch.

== Academics ==
For each academic year, the Texas Education Agency rates school performance using statistical data. For 2017–2018, the school scored 73 out of 100, classified as "Met Standard." The following year, the school received a score of 78 and a C grade. Due to the COVID-19 pandemic, schools were not rated in 2019–2020 and 2020–2021. For 2021–2022, the school received a score of 69 and was not rated.

== Notable alumni ==
- Ahmed Ali — Sudanese professional sprinter, 2016 Summer Olympics
- Ronnie Amadi — CFL football player for the Calgary Stampeders
- Mo Amer — stand-up comedian
- Donnie Avery — NFL football player for the Kansas City Chiefs
- Jermall Charlo and Jermell Charlo — boxers aligned with Premier Boxing Champions
- Pat Combs — former MLB pitcher
- Matt Maysey - former MLB pitcher
- Shawn Dingilius-Wallace — swimmer for Palau in the 2016 Summer Olympics
- Ali Siddiq — stand-up comedian
- Dean Hill — professional hockey referee (WPHL, CHL, ECHL)
- Maxo Kream — rapper
- Duy-Loan Le — Texas Instruments senior fellow
- Tembi Locke — actor
- Aaron May — rapper
- Christian Menefee - attorney
- Thien Thanh Thi Nguyen — better known by her stage name Tila Tequila
- Kevin Obanor — professional basketball player
- Sonal Shah — economist
- Monique Truong — novelist
- Rodrique Wright — Canadian Football League football player for the Saskatchewan Roughriders
- Richard Yoo — entrepreneur, former CEO and founder of Rackspace, former CEO and founder of ServerBeach
- Kyle Smith — head men's basketball coach, Stanford University
- Don Toliver — Rapper
