= Alief Kerr High School =

Magnet school in Texas, United States

Location
- 8150 Sugarland Howell; Houston, Texas; United States; 29.69111°N 95.634313°W

Information
- Type: Public magnet school
- Motto: "Be the difference that makes the difference!"
- Established: 1994
- School district: Alief Independent School District
- Principal: Sara Tones
- Teaching staff: 40.67 (FTE)
- Grades: 9-12
- Enrollment: 796 (2018-2019)
- Student to teacher ratio: 19.82
- Colors: Purple; White
- Team name: Tigers
- Website: Alief Kerr High School

Alief Kerr High School is an Alief ISD public school located in the Alief community, and in the limited purpose city limits of Houston, Texas, United States. The school is a part of the Alief Independent School District and serves grades 9 through 12.

Kerr High School was awarded the Blue Ribbon School Award of Excellence by the United States Department of Education, the highest award an American school can receive, during the 2010–11 school year. The school also received the award in 2016, one of only 26 Texas schools to receive the award. The school also received the award in 2022.

It is located in the International District.

== History ==
Kerr High School was formally dedicated on March 12, 1995. It was named for Carey Jean Kerr, who began her 15-year career in Alief at Chancellor Elementary in 1976. In 1982, she transferred to Alief Middle School, where she was a special populations counselor and worked with at-risk students.

"Her open-door policy inspired a trusting bond special needs kids often find hard to develop...Carey's accomplishments are immeasurable," reads the letter of nomination to the school board.

Kerr died in 1992 after a severe asthma attack. The school opened in the fall of 1994. In May 1996, the first class had approximately 55 students graduate.

== Demographics ==
In the 2018–2019 school year, there were 796 students. 11.3% were African American, 63.1% were Asian, 20.2% were Hispanic, 0.5% were American Indian, 4.3% were White, and 0.6% were two or more races. 66.6% of students were Economically Disadvantaged, 0.9% were English Language Learners, and 0.3% received Special Education services.

== Structure ==
Kerr is a school of choice and not a magnet school without an official area of concentration. Unlike traditional campuses, students are not separated into individual classes with one assigned teacher. Students can seek out a variety of peer and teacher input, and can work at their own pace, following their given deadlines. Rather than the teaching of a traditional classroom, students are taught in big centers, where students from 9-12 grade are together learning their different core subjects.

Students usually apply to Kerr in their 8th grade year, but applications can be accepted in later grades. Students and their parents must attend an orientation and then students submit applications. Admission to Kerr is determined based on grades, student behavior, and attendance records. Traditional high schools in Alief ISD are assigned by a lottery to either Alief Elsik High School, Alief Hastings High School, or Alief Taylor High School. Alief Kerr and Alief Taylor are located across the street from each other; Kerr shares transportation with Alief Taylor.

Kerr High School added an extension building in the summer of 2017, which was targeted towards the fine arts, such as band, orchestra, choir, visual arts, and theater arts.

=== Independent learning ===
Kerr is based on independent learning. Under a teacher's guidance, the student proceeds through their course on their own. They are given deadlines for completion of assignments, projects, and tests.

Although students are in an independent learning environment, they can always ask teachers for help. Mondays through Fridays (excluding Wednesdays due to it being a short school day) are days where students can stay after school for tutorials or seminars for any extra help. An example of this would be on Mondays where the Science center is open during after-school hours for students to come for any needed help or to ask questions on material. Students may also go the library to complete assignments, study, or read.

In many classes, teachers go over the course material once a week in a seminar. Separate seminar rooms are available for teacher instruction. These seminars are usually given when students receive a new PAK, or a few days before testing day, as a review.

=== Personal Activity Kits ===
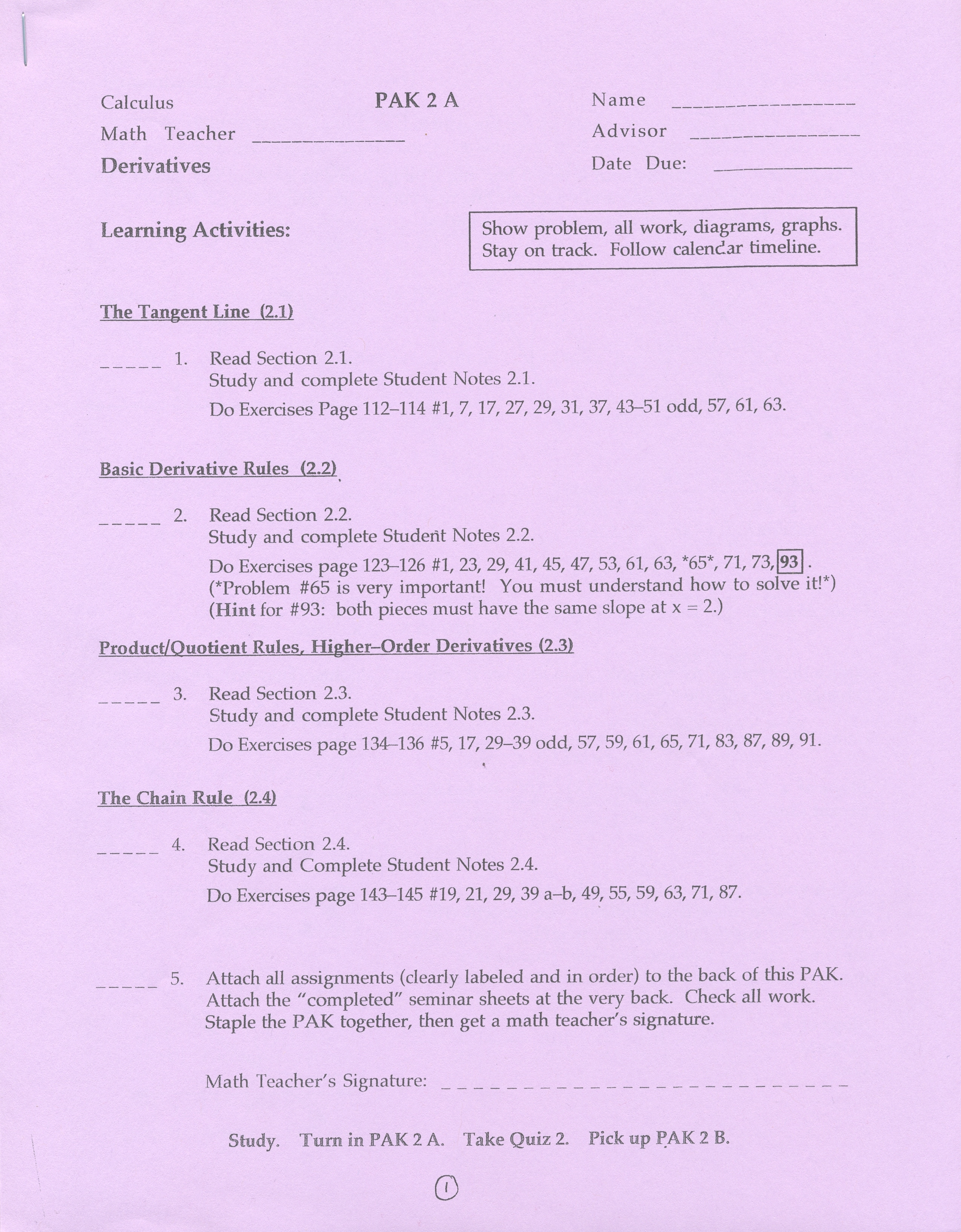
Front page of an AP Calculus PAK

Instead of traditional assignments, PAKs (Personal Activity Kits) are administered for each class. PAKs include all the work for the unit. Teachers inform students of the objectives, direct them to learning materials, and prepare them for tests/quizzes. The PAK system encourages students to participate in teamwork, seminars, and large groups to provide opportunities for teacher-directed and group learning. After the PAK is turned in, a test or a quiz is given over that material. New PAKs are typically issued every one to two weeks.

=== Centers ===
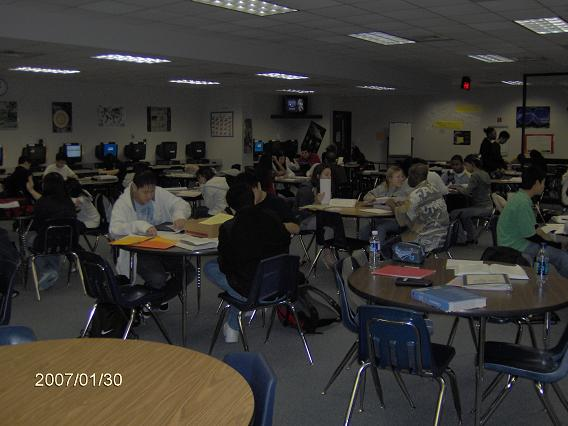
Alief Kerr Science Center

Instead of small traditional classrooms, Alief Kerr has large centers for each core subject. Every class in a specific subject is held in the subject's center. For example, all the science classes are held in the Science Center. This includes Anatomy, Astronomy, Biology, Chemistry, Environmental Science, Aquatic Science, and Physics. Centers can hold up to 150 students. Teachers are typically responsible for more than one subject at a time. A science teacher may be teaching Chemistry I, Physics I, and AP Physics during the same period. The centers at Alief Kerr include Art, Business, English, Foreign Language, Math, Science, and Social Studies.

Webmastering/Computer Science, Journalism, and Speech are all held in traditional-type classrooms. While these classrooms are smaller than the major centers, these classes still abide by Kerr's theme of independent learning and the PAK system.

== Fine Arts Program ==
When the school opened in 1994, it was limited to Band, Orchestra, and Choir. There was a small Full Orchestra as part of the UIL competition. There was also small group for theater (black box) and art.

== Rankings and acknowledgements ==
Kerr High School was awarded the Blue Ribbon School Award of Excellence by the United States Department of Education, the highest award an American school can receive, during the 2010–11 school year. The school also received the award in 2016, one of only 26 Texas schools to receive the award.

=== TEA acknowledgements ===
Alief Kerr achieved the "Recognized" status from the Texas Education Agency accountability ratings system in the 2006, 2007 and 2008 school years. For the 2009, 2010, and 2011 school years, Alief Kerr received the highest recognition possible, "Exemplary", from the TEA.

2008 Texas Education Agency Gold Performance Acknowledgements Program:

- Advanced Course/Dual Enrollment Completion
- Advanced Placement/International Baccalaureate Results
- Attendance Rate
- Commended Performance: Reading/English Language Arts (ELA)
- Commended Performance: Mathematics
- Commended Performance: Social Studies
- Comparable Improvement: Reading/ELA
- Recommended High School Program/Distinguished Achievement Program
- SAT/ACT Results
- Texas Success Initiative-Higher Education Readiness Component: ELA
- Texas Success Initiative-Higher Education Readiness Component: Mathematics

For the 2018–2019 school year, the school received an A grade from the Texas Education Agency, with an overall score of 99 out of 100. The school received an A grade in all three domains with a score of 98 in Student Achievement, 97 in School Progress, and 100 in Closing the Gaps. The school received six of the seven possible distinction designations. "Top 25%: Comparative Academic Growth" was the only distinction the school did not receive.

Children At Risk is a policy research and advocacy organization focused on improving children's quality of life. The organization ranks public high schools in eight counties of the Houston metro area. Kerr has done well on Children At Risk rankings annually. It is currently ranked 5th in the Greater Houston Area. Kerr is also ranked 4th best as a Math and Science school in the Houston area. In addition, Kerr was 10th "most improved" in the Houston area.

Rating	2007	2008	2009	2010	2011
Top HS in Houston	11	19	9	3
Top HS in Texas	N/A	N/A	N/A	9
Top Math and Science HS in Houston	N/A	N/A	N/A	4

== See also ==
- Alief Independent School District
