= Alief Early College High School =

Public school in Texas, United States

Coordinates: 29.7341°N 95.5744°W

Location
- 2811 A Hayes Rd; Houston, Texas 77082; United States

Information
- School type: Early College High School
- Established: 2009
- School district: Alief Independent School District
- Principal: Matthew Skiles
- Teaching staff: 22.45 (on an FTE basis)
- Grades: 9–12
- Gender: Coed
- Enrollment: 407 (2022–23)
- Student to teacher ratio: 18.13
- Colors: Dark cyan and White
- Athletics conference: UIL Class 6A
- Mascot: Knight
- Website: aechs.aliefisd.net/o/aechs

Alief Early College High School (AECHS) is a magnet high school in Houston, Texas and a part of the Alief Independent School District, in conjunction with Houston Community College. It was scheduled to open in fall 2009, and 120 spaces were to be available for ninth grade students. For the 2021-2022 school year, the school was given an "A" by the Texas Education Agency.

The permanent campus was scheduled to open around fall 2010, with a temporary facility used for the school's first year.

It allows students to take courses for dual credit and graduate with both a high school diploma and the equivalent of an associate degree at the same time. As part of the curriculum, each student would take up to sixty credits at HCC during their high school career.

== Admissions ==
Admission to the Alief Early College High School is by application only. According to Robin Foster of the Houston Chronicle, admission to the school is not based on ability. Rather, "Students who will be selected are mostly under-represented at four-year colleges or will be the first in their family to attend college."
