= Overseas Chinese banks =

Banks outside China catering for Chinese immigrants by overseas Chinese

Overseas Chinese-focused banks are banks that operate outside China that cater to Chinese immigrants in foreign countries, these banks are not controlled by the Chinese government, nor do they have any ties with the Chinese government.

These independent banks were originally established in immigrant communities to remit money back to China but later moved to cater to the people of their adopted countries. These overseas Chinese banks contributed to a large extent to the development of the countries and communities in which they were located. Overseas Chinese banks normally refer to Chinese banks outside China (including Hong Kong and Macau).

== Southeast Asia ==
In Southeast Asia, overseas Chinese banks support the local overseas Chinese population that play a significant if not dominant role in the local economy.

=== Indonesia ===
- Bank Buana (Part of United Overseas Bank)
- Lippo Banking Group
- Panin Bank (No.11 Overseas Chinese Bank)
- NISP Bank (Part of Oversea-Chinese Banking Corporation)

=== Singapore ===
- United Overseas Bank (No.1 Overseas Chinese Bank)
- Oversea-Chinese Banking Corporation (No.2 Overseas Chinese Bank)

=== Malaysia ===
- Public Bank (No.4 Overseas Chinese Bank)
- Hong Leong Bank (No.6 Overseas Chinese Bank)

=== Philippines ===
- Banco de Oro Universal Bank
- Philippine National Bank (No.12 Overseas Chinese Bank)
- Metropolitan Bank and Trust Company (No.9 Overseas Chinese Bank)
- Rizal Commercial Banking Corporation (No.14 Overseas Chinese Bank)
- Chinabank (No.10 Overseas Chinese Bank)
- Security Bank (No.13 Overseas Chinese Bank)
- Philippine Savings Bank (No.15 Overseas Chinese Bank) (part of Metropolitan Bank and Trust Company)

=== Thailand ===
- Bangkok Bank (No.5 Overseas Chinese Bank and No.1 Thai Bank)
- Kasikorn Bank (No.7 Overseas Chinese Bank and No.3 Thai Bank)
- Bank of Ayudhya (No.8 Overseas Chinese Bank)
- Bank of Asia (Part of United Overseas Bank)
- Radanasin Bank (Part of United Overseas Bank to be merged with Bank of Asia)

== United States ==
In addition to Southeast Asia, the second location where most overseas Chinese banks are is the United States. However, unlike Southeast Asia where Chinese play dominant roles in the local economy, the Chinese Americans’ share of the highly developed American economy is small and most overseas Chinese banks in the United States are privately held.

=== Strategy for survival ===
The oversea Chinese banks in the United States are hardly able to compete with the well established mainstream banks on equal terms and their assets are often far less than that of those well established mainstream banks. Therefore, most overseas Chinese banks in the United States adopted a different strategy than their Southeast Asian counterparts by serving a particular segment of the market. Most overseas Chinese banks are relatively small banks in terms of assets and they began as community banks catering to their local Chinese community in the United States. A few of the banks would later expand to the national level but most remain at the community level, tailoring to the specific needs of the local overseas Chinese, such as helping them to remit money back to China, to provide finance for import and export businesses, and real estate.

=== Distribution in the United States ===
Most overseas Chinese banks in the United States are concentrated in the western part of the country and in New York City mirroring the traditional population distribution of the Chinese Americans in the United States. Some overseas Chinese banks have opened offices in other parts of the country, as the pattern of Chinese immigration had changed.

=== List of Overseas Chinese Banks in the United States ===
These banks are not controlled or influenced by the Chinese government. They are independently and privately owned, and cater to the Chinese and Asian populations of their respective countries.

- Abacus Federal Savings Bank
- American Continental Bank
- American Premier Bank (2003–2011)
- Asia Bank N.A.
- Bank of the Orient
- Cathay Bank
- Chinese American Bank
- East West Bank
- EverTrust Bank
- First American International Bank
- Global Commerce Bank
- Golden Security Bank
- Los Angeles National Bank
- MetroCorp Bancshares
- Omni Bank (California)
- Pacific Global Bank
- Preferred Bank
- Southwestern National Bank
- Tomato Bank
- United Commercial Bank
- United International Bank
- United Orient Bank
- Universal Bank

== Latin America ==
There is only one Overseas Chinese bank in the Latin American region.

=== Costa Rica ===
- Banco Cathay de Costa Rica
