= Dominic Ng =

American banker (born 1959)

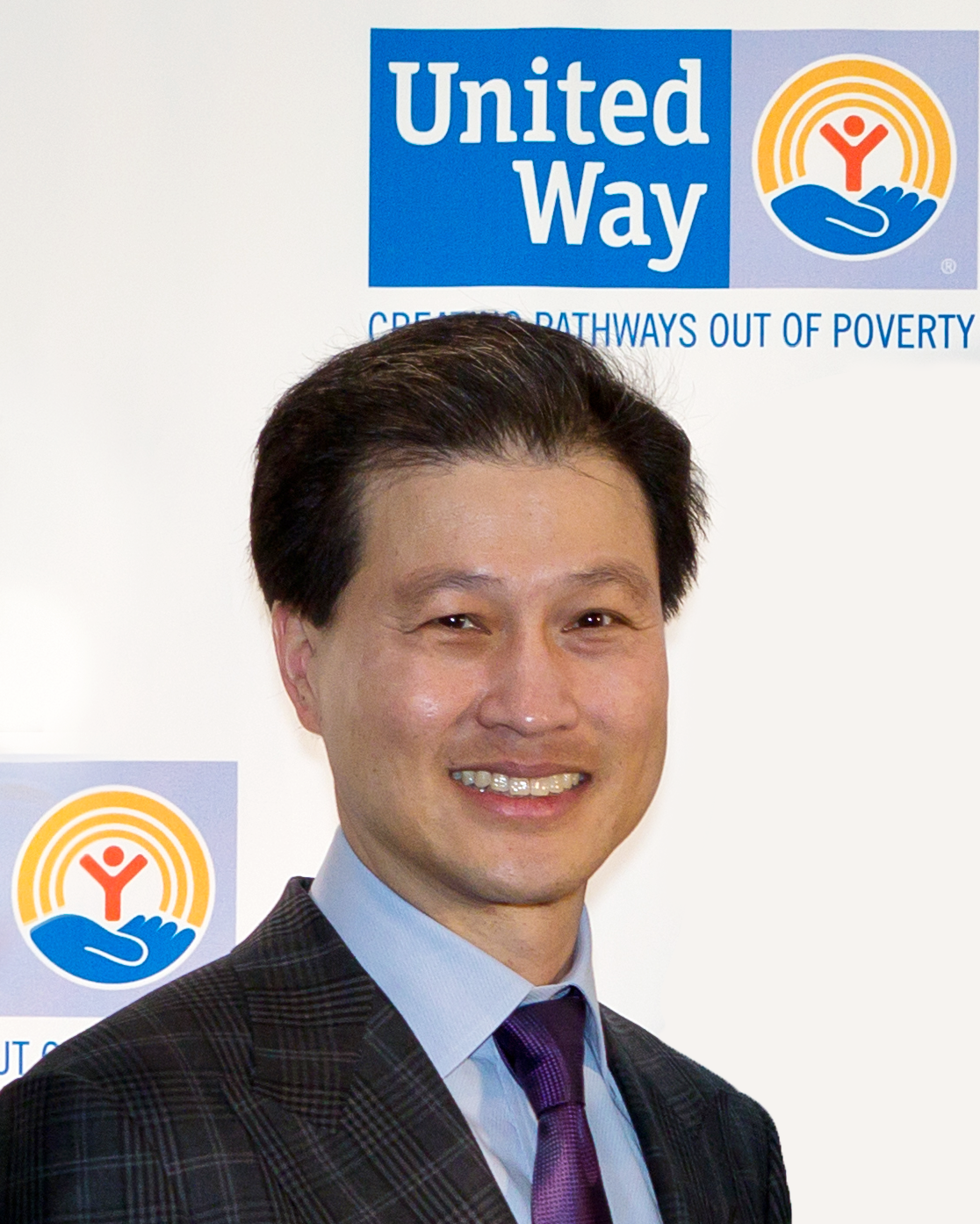
- Born: 1959 (age 66–67); Hong Kong
- Education: University of Houston
- Occupations: Chairman, president and CEO, East West Bank and East West Bancorp

Dominic Ng (born 1959) is an American banker. He has been the CEO of Los Angeles–based East West Bank since 1992, and chairman and CEO since 1998, transforming it from a savings and loan association into an international commercial bank. Ng is involved in entertainment and other industries.

Ng is also a philanthropist, supporting East Asian culture and art primarily in Southern California. In 2023, he was chair of the Asia-Pacific Economic Cooperation Business Advisory Council.

== Early life ==
Ng was born in the then-British Hong Kong, the youngest of six children. He was part of a wave of Hong Kong students who came to the United States to study in the 1970s, and earned a bachelor's degree in accounting from the University of Houston. Ng became a United States citizen in 1988.

== Career ==
Ng began his career as a Certified Public Accountant with Touche Ross in Houston and Los Angeles. In 1992, Ng became East West Bank's president and CEO. At the time, the bank was a $600 million savings and loan association.

Ng expanded on the bank's original mission of financing underserved Chinese immigrants, growing the bank's business internationally. He leveraged his Asia connections with mainstream American companies and made East West a commercial bank in 1995, allowing it to handle international trade financing. Ng adapted the bank's mission to become what he describes as "the financial bridge between the East and the West".

In 1998, Ng engineered East West Bank's sale in a management-led buyout. He became the bank's chairman that same year. The bank's parent entity, East West Bancorp, went public in 1999. Ng started East West's "Spirit of Ownership" program, whereby every East West employee receives the same amount of stock in the company every year, attributing the bank's sustainable growth in part to this program.

During Ng's tenure, East West has bought several financial institutions. East West doubled its assets after the purchase of its closest competitor, United Commercial Bank, in 2009. The acquisition expanded East West to Atlanta, Boston, New York, and Seattle. While Ng considers Los Angeles "a priority," East West is also active in San Diego, San Francisco, and Silicon Valley, as well as Dallas, Houston, and Las Vegas.

Ng also focuses on biotech, clean technology, private equity, health care, real estate, renewable energy, sustainability financing, and cross-border business. A 2022 Forbes profile of Ng called him "a business bridge between the U.S. and Asia." By 2025, East West Bank had over 100 locations in the U.S. and Asia, and more than $78 billion in assets.

After the 2008 financial crisis, Ng expanded the bank's financing into the entertainment industry. The Hollywood Reporter named him as one of the top U.S. bankers connecting Hollywood film studios to investors in China, helping to arrange financing once investment deals are in place. In July 2025, Ng partnered with South Korean entertainment company CJ ENM, Miky Lee, and Janet Yang to oversee a new label called First Light StoryHouse, which is dedicated to Asian and Asian American storytelling for major studios and streamers.

=== Federal Reserve ===
From 2005 to 2011, Ng was on the board of directors of the Federal Reserve Bank of San Francisco, Los Angeles Branch.

=== Asia-Pacific Economic Cooperation Business Advisory Council ===
In 2022, Ng was appointed by the Biden administration to be a U.S. member of the Asia-Pacific Economic Cooperation Business Advisory Council, and later that year was announced to chair the 2023 APEC summit to be hosted by the U.S. His specific focus included small- and medium-sized enterprises, digitalization, sustainability, and climate change.

Ng's appointment attracted scrutiny from several Republican lawmakers, spearheaded by Lance Gooden, over his connections to China-based organizations. Representative Judy Chu, chair of the Congressional Asian Pacific American Caucus, characterized the scrutiny as racist in nature.

During the 2023 APEC summit in San Francisco, Ng and other APEC members presented a series of policy recommendations to world leaders. Ng and San Francisco Mayor London Breed also hosted a private welcome reception for the APEC Business Advisory Council.

== Philanthropy and community involvement ==
The Los Angeles Times describes Ng as a "philanthropist banker” and "inclusion practitioner” who promotes civic responsibility. Ng has supported the showcasing of East Asian culture and art by major U.S. institutions, including the Los Angeles County Museum of Art, Museum of Contemporary Art, Los Angeles, Huntington Library, Bowers Museum, USC Pacific Asia Museum, Asian Art Museum, and The Broad.

Ng is on the boards of Mattel, Inc., the Academy Museum of Motion Pictures, and the University of Southern California, in addition to being a member of the Council on Foreign Relations.

Ng was a board member of the United Way of Greater Los Angeles, becoming the first Asian-American chair of the United Way campaign in 2000–2001 and raising a record $66 million. From 2011 to 2014, he was chairman of the Committee of 100. Ng has also been on the boards of PacifiCare Health Systems and the Anderson School at UCLA.

=== Accolades ===
In 2006, the Los Angeles Times named Ng one of Southern California's 100 most influential people. In 2008, Forbes named Ng as one of 25 notable Chinese Americans. In 2017, American Banker named Ng its "Consistent Performer" in its Banker of the Year awards, noting East West's transformation and credit discipline.

In 2018, the University of Houston dedicated the Dominic & Ellen Ng Academic Center for Excellence to him and his wife. Columbia University's Weatherhead East Asian Institute recognized Ng with its 75th Anniversary Award for Excellence in February 2024.

In 2024, Ng was named to the Los Angeles Times' "L.A. Influential" list, with the Times writing that he "champions the durable power of steady growth."

In April 2025, Ng became the first recipient of the Wallis Annenberg Center for the Performing Arts’ Wallis Icon Award for his corporate philanthropy. In May 2025, he received a “Twice a Citizen” award from the Los Angeles Police Reserve Foundation for his support of law enforcement.

== Personal life ==
Ng lives in Pasadena, California.
