= Division (business) =

Part of an organization

A division, sometimes called a business sector or business unit (segment), is one of the parts into which a business, organization or company is divided. Divisions are created to focus on different markets, consumers or types of product or service and are a way of structurally organising a business. Subsidiaries differ from divisions as they are separate legal entities. Corporate re-structuring can result in changes to the divisional structure of a business.

== Overview ==
Divisions are distinct parts of a business. If these divisions are all part of the same company, then that company is legally responsible for the division's activities and finances. Traditional businesses have a functional structure, where employees are grouped by the activity they contribute to, such as marketing, finance and sales. A divisional business structure helps an organisation to effectively allocate resources, to manage operations. This way of organising a business, can divide activities by customer group, market, product or service, an example being divisions created based on market location.

A business division typically has its own management team who assumes responsibility for its operations, performance and personnel, to contribute to the profitability of the company. Business divisions can also be established to pursue a corporate strategy objective, such as diversification. A business division has its own revenues, expenditures and financial result, which should be measured to monitor the success of the division and financial contribution to the business.

== Advantages and disadvantages ==
Businesses can structure themselves in different ways. The advantages of using business divisions include improved accountability where a division has defined goals and objectives which are measured, local advantage where a division is based on a particular geolocation with resources adapting to the needs of customers in that location, improved culture via teams working together with greater focus and more effective offerings as products and services are tailored to customers. Disadvantages of this type of corporate structure can include it creating internal competition between divisions, higher costs via increased management levels and resource duplication, opportunities to create economies of scale being lost between divisions and it creating a silo effect where learnings are not shared across the company.

== Divisions versus subsidiaries ==
Subsidiaries are separate, distinct legal entities for the purposes of taxation, regulation and liability. In the banking industry, an example would be East West Bancorp and its primary subsidiary, East West Bank. Subsidiaries differ from divisions, which are business units fully integrated within the main company, and not legally or otherwise distinct from it.

The Houston Chronicle highlighted that the creation of a division "is substantially easier than developing subsidiaries. Because a division is an internal segment of a company, not an entirely separate entity, business owners create and end divisions at their whim. Also, because individuals in each division are employed by the same company, it's easier to modify staffing to fit with this setup".

== Corporate re-structuring ==
Corporate re-structuring can lead to the establishment of divisions or to a change in the number of divisions a business has. At the end of 2022, a Nasdaq re-organisation created three divisions: Market Platforms, Capital Access Platforms and Anti-Financial Crime. The purpose of these divisions being created was to respond to changes within the financial systems business environment and to align with customer needs. Announcements that divisional structures may change can create an immediate fluctuation in share price. When Warner Bros. Discovery publicised a re-organisation in 2024 that involved changing from three to two divisions, their share price increased by 12%. In 2025, in response to industry market pressures, Pernod Ricard re-organised from a brand based structure to create two divisions, with the objective being to reduce costs and consolidate resources. Later that year, Unilever decided to spin off their Ice Cream division.

== See also ==
- Brand
- Subsidiary
