= Julia S. Gouw =

Indonesian-American businessperson

Julia Suryapranata Gouw
- Born: Surabaya, Indonesia
- Education: University of Illinois Urbana-Champaign
- Occupations: Former President, Chief Operating Officer and a member of the Board of Directors of East West Bancorp, Inc. and East West Bank, Community Leader, Philanthropist
- Spouse: Ken Keng-Hok Gouw

Julia Suryapranata Gouw is the former president, chief operating officer and a member of the board of directors of East West Bancorp, Inc. and East West Bank. She originally joined East West Bank in 1989 as controller and became executive vice president and chief financial officer from 1994 to 2008.

== Early life ==
She was born in Surabaya, Indonesia. Her father was originally from Bali, and her mother was from Banjarmasin. Gouw spent 18 years of her life in Surabaya with her family. Gouw graduated from SMA Santa Maria Surabaya, and soon after she graduated high school she moved to the United States in 1978 where she earned a bachelor's degree in Accounting from the University of Illinois at Urbana-Champaign. She married Ken Keng-Hok Gouw on June 1, 1981.

== Career ==
Gouw served as Senior Audit Manager at KPMG where she managed a team of accountants that performed the financial and regulatory audits of financial institutions, real estate firms, and construction companies.

Gouw first joined East West Bank in 1989 as controller. Shortly thereafter, Gouw was appointed executive vice president and chief financial officer. She held this position until 2008, after which she became chief risk officer. Gouw was then appointed president and chief operating officer in 2009 until her retirement from East West Bank in March 2016.

She has served as a commissioner for the Ontario International Airport Authority (OIAA) since September 2016.

== Board activity and awards ==
Gouw has been ranked among the "25 Most Powerful Women in Banking" five times by American Banker Magazine and has twice received the Los Angeles Business Journal's "Women Making a Difference" award. She has also been recognized in Los Angeles Business Journal's "L.A.'s Top Women in Finance". Gouw has been named Philanthropist of the Year by the National Association of Women Business Owners in Los Angeles. She has also been featured in the book Women Leaders at Work – Untold Tales of Women Achieving Their Ambitions alongside a select group of women founders and CEOs.

Corporate board activity

- Board of directors of East West Bancorp, Inc. and East West Bank (2004 – 2016)
- Board of directors of Pacific Mutual Holding Company and Pacific Life Corp. (2011–present)

Nonprofit board and committee activity

- Board of visitors – UCLA School of Medicine (1997–2012)
- Carter Center – Ambassador Circle (2000)
- Board of overseers – Los Angeles Philharmonic (2001–present)
- United Way's Major Gift Advisory Council (2002–2003)
- Board of directors – Huntington Hospital (2003–2008)
- Board of trustees – Saint John's Health Foundation (2003 – present)
- Executive women's advisory board, UCLA Iris Cantor Women's Health (2004 – present)
- Board of directors – The UCLA Foundation (2006–2013)
- Board of directors – John Wayne Cancer Institute (2007–2012)
- Board of directors – California Bankers Association (2011 – present)
- Economic Development Task Force – City of Pasadena (2012)
- Board of overseers – UCLA Health System (2013–present)

Awards and recognitions

- 25 Most Powerful Women in Banking – American Banker Magazine (2003, 2005, 2006, 2007, 2011)
- Philanthropist of the Year – National Association of Women Business Owners, Los Angeles (NAWBO- LA) in partnership with United Way's Women Leaders (2003)
- Philanthropist of the Year, Women Making a Difference – Los Angeles Business Journal (2003, 2008)
- Top 10 CFOs in Banking – American Banker (2006)
- Best CFO's in America – Institutional Investor magazine (2006, 2007)
- 25 Women to Watch – American Banker Magazine (2010)
- L.A.'s Top Women in Finance, Los Angeles Business Journal (2012)
- Featured in Women Leaders at Work – Untold Tales of Women Achieving Their Ambitions, by Elizabeth Ghaffari

== Women's health advocacy ==
Gouw served on the board of visitors of the David Geffen School of Medicine at UCLA, where she established an endowed chair for mood disorders research. She also served on the board of directors of The UCLA Foundation and is the founding chair of the executive women's advisory board for the Iris Cantor-UCLA Women's Health Center.
