= Presidential Guard (South Vietnam) =

- Lữ đoàn Liên binh phòng vệ Tổng Thống Phủ
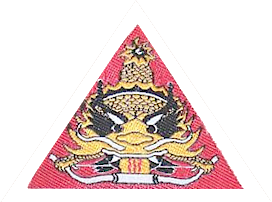
- Forces shirt insignia
- Active: 1955–1975
- Country: South Vietnam
- Allegiance: President of South Vietnam
- Branch: Army of the Republic of Vietnam
- Role: Presidential guard
- Size: ~2,500
- Garrison/HQ: Cộng Hòa barracks, Saigon
- Engagements: 1960 South Vietnamese coup attempt 1963 South Vietnamese coup d'état

Commanders
- Notable commanders: Lê Quang Tung; Lê Ngọc Triển; Nguyễn Hữu Duệ; Phạm Văn Hưởng; Huỳnh Văn Lạc; Tôn Thất Đính; Nguyễn Ngọc Khôi

Insignia
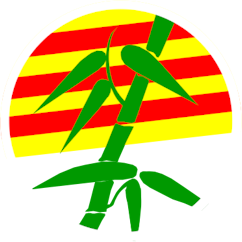
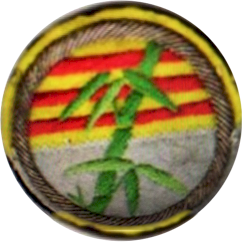
- Unit badge and Hat badge

The Presidential Guard (Vietnamese: Lữ đoàn Liên binh phòng vệ Tổng Thống Phủ Chữ Hán: 旅團聯兵防衛總統府) was a military unit of the Army of the Republic of Vietnam (ARVN) that was assigned to personally protect the President of the Republic of Vietnam, the nation-state that existed from 1955 to 1975. This force formed the bulwark of defences against continual coups, preventing previous coups against Ngo Dinh Diem, and would be maintained to prevent further coups in the wake of political instability following it.

== History ==
=== 1960 coup ===
During the 1960 South Vietnamese coup attempt 60 members of the Guard defended the Independence Palace when it came under attack by ARVN paratroops in the early morning of 11 November. The paratroops had been informed that the Guard had mutinied and captured Diem. Meanwhile, other rebel forces had captured most of the key sites of state control including the Cộng Hòa barracks. The Guards in the palace building and grounds successfully defended the area forcing the paratroops to bring in additional men and then five armored vehicles but they were unable to overrun the Guards and the coup collapsed when Diem brought in loyalist forces.

=== 1963 coup ===
During the 1963 South Vietnamese coup rebel forces from the ARVN 5th Division commanded by Colonel Nguyễn Văn Thiệu attacked both the Cộng Hòa barracks and the Gia Long Palace. At Cộng Hòa barracks 5th Division armored and artillery units faced off with the Guard forces armed with tanks, artillery, mortars and machine guns. Rebel artillery soon reduced the barracks to rubble while Guards forces fired back causing damage to the surrounding area. At Gia Long Palace approximately 150 Guards defended the building with machine and antiaircraft guns from bunkers and pillboxes, and with tanks and 20-mm cannons mounted on armored vehicles. As Diệm refused to surrender, after sunset, Thiệu led his 7th Division in an assault on the palace. They used artillery and flamethrowers and it fell by daybreak on 2 November after Diệm finally gave the order to the Guard to surrender. Guard losses in the coup were four dead and 44 injured.

=== Vietnam War ===
During the Tet Offensive, Guard units successfully defended the Independence Palace when it was attacked by a 14-person team from the VC F100 Special Action Group. The VC attempted to blast their way through the south gate to the palace (10.7757°N 106.6969°E) but were engaged by Guards supported by two M41 tanks, killing four VC. The VC then retreated across the street into an unfinished apartment building where they held out for 30 hours before the seven survivors surrendered after having exhausted all their ammunition.

== Headquarters ==
The headquarters and barracks of the Guard were located at the Cộng Hòa barracks in close proximity to the Gia Long Palace and the Independence Palace. The former Foyer du Soldat et du Marin (now the Ho Chi Minh Campaign Museum) at 2 Le Duan Boulevard became a clubhouse for the Guard until 1967 when it was transformed into the National Defense College (Truong Cao dang Quốc phòng) to train ARVN officers above the rank of Colonel.

== Personnel and equipment ==
In August 1963 the Guard was commanded by Lieutenant colonel Nguyễn Ngọc Khoi and had an estimated strength of 2,500 men. Its heavy weapons included 10 M24 Chaffee tanks, six M113 armored personnel carriers, six M114 armored fighting vehicles, vehicles with M45 Quadmounts, recoilless rifles and bazookas.

== See also ==
- Republic of Vietnam’s Military Forces
- Republic of Vietnam National Police
