= Universal Bank (disambiguation) =

Universal Bank may refer to:

- Universal bank, a multi-services type of financial institution
- Universal Bank, a bank in the United States
- Universal Bank (Ukraine), a Ukrainian bank
- Universal Merchant Bank, a Ghanaian bank
