= First American International Bank =

- Company type: Private
- Industry: Finance and Insurance
- Founded: 1999
- Defunct: April 2018
- Fate: Acquired by Royal Business Bank
- Headquarters: Brooklyn, New York City, New York, United States
- Key people: Mr. Patrick Yau
- Products: Banking
- Website: faib.com

First American International Bank (Chinese: 恆通銀行) was an overseas Chinese bank in the United States. Headquartered in Brooklyn, with branch offices in Chinatown, Manhattan, and Chinatown, Flushing, this privately held community bank was first established on November 15, 1999.

The bank was established to serve Asian, Chinese, low-income, recent immigrants located in the five boroughs of New York City, as they lack credit history, and thus were often likely to be turned down by other mainstream banks. Nearly 80% of First American National Bank's basic banking account services, consumer and business loans, and mortgages have been made in low-moderate income and distressed areas as defined by the United States Department of the Treasury.

The bank provided credit counseling, and worked with local social service organizations such as the Chinese American Planning Council in conducting educational and counseling sessions on the use of basic banking services, personal credit, and housing mortgages for Chinese immigrants.

The bank was designated as a Certified Community Development Financial Institution (CDFI) by the United States Department of the Treasury.

The bank was acquired by Royal Business Bank in April 2018.
