= Global Commerce Bank =

- Type: Private
- Industry: Finance and Insurance
- Founded: Doraville, Georgia, U.S. (1995)
- Defunct: March 2, 2012
- Headquarters: Doraville, Georgia, U.S.
- Products: Banking
- Website: www.bankonglobal.com

Global Commerce Bank (Chinese: 國際銀行) was an ethnic Chinese bank in the United States. Headquartered in Doraville, Georgia, this privately held community bank was established on August 18, 1995, and closed in 2012.

The location of Global Commerce Bank in the south reflected one of the trends at that time of Chinese American and Asian American population diffusion into the area other than the traditional regions settled by Asian Americans such as the western and northeastern United States. All of the directors and most of the investors were American citizens of Chinese ancestry. The bank was located in the Asian Square, next to the 99 Ranch Market.

In addition to the traditional banking services provided to the local community, Global Commerce Bank also offered credit instruments, such as letters of credit that facilitate international trade. Based on Georgia Banks’ performance report for the year 2003, Financial Management Consulting Group ranked Global Commerce Bank as the 9th best performing bank among 323 banks in Georgia.

== Closure ==
On March 2, 2012, Global Commerce Bank was closed by state regulators, with three failed branches reopening as part of Metro City Bank. Global Commerce Bank was the 12th U.S. bank to fail that year, costing the FDIC an estimated $18 million.
