= José Ángel Sánchez Asiaín =

Spanish economists

José Ángel Sánchez Asiaín, 1st Marquess of Asiaín, GCIH, KmstkNO (Baracaldo, Spain, 1 March 1929 – Madrid, 31 December 2016) was a Spanish industrialist, university professor and economist.

== Early life ==
Sánchez Asiaín received a master's degree in law at the University of Deusto, Bilbao (in the Spanish Basque country) and was awarded a Doctorate in Economy by the Central University of Madrid in 1958.

He began his professional life at the Bank of Bilbao and became a professor at the University of Valladolid, there obtaining the chair of Public Finance and Tax Law. He was attached as the General Technical Secretary to the Spanish Ministry of Industry. In 1968, he became chair of the University of Bilbao, at that time leaving the work at the Ministry and relaunching his activity at the Bank of Bilbao, where he was the Director of Studies, nominated as Director General of the bank, and he served as chairman until it merged with the Banco Bilbao Vizcaya Argentaria (BBVA).

== Professional career ==
In 1990 Sánchez Asiaín became President of Foundation BBV, a predecessor of Foundation BBVA (a not-for-profit social initiative). He served as a board director of different companies, notably Altos Hornos de Vizcaya, Iberduero, Banco de Crédito Industrial, and United International Bank.

After his retirement as a banker, he remained to perform other activities. Sánchez Asiaín served as President of the Museo del Prado in Madrid, from 1990 to 1993, and the COTEC Foundation, whose purpose is to stimulate innovation in the Spanish industry.

Although due to retirement not performing anymore the profession as a banker, he remained Honorary President of BBVA Foundation. He was also an advisor to several Spanish and foreign organizations, notably the Vatican Institute for Works of Religion, the Social Council of Technical University of Madrid, the Spanish Foundation against Drug Addiction and the Colegio Libre de Eméritos Universitarios de Madrid (a foundation to support academics in retirement). He held an honorary doctorates from the University of the Basque Country and the Miguel Hernández University of Elche in Valencia. He was elected to medalla nº 6 of the Real Academia de la Historia on 20 October 1989, he took up his seat on 8 April 1992. He was an academic of the European Academy of Sciences and Arts and the Spanish Royal Academy of Policy regarding science and morality, and honorary member of the Royal Academy of Fine Arts of San Fernando.

== Accolades ==
He held, among other awards, the Grand Cross of the Spanish Civil Order of Alfonso X, the Wise, and the Grand Cross of the Portuguese Order of Prince Henry (GCIH). He was Grand Officer of the Order of Merit of the Italian Republic and Commander Grand Cross of the Swedish Order of the Polar Star (KmstkNO). On 8 April 2010, Asiaín was raised into the Spanish nobility by King Juan Carlos I with the hereditary title of Marqués de Asiaín (English: Marquess of Asiaín).

He was further distinguished with the "Lan Onari" of the (Spanish) Basque Government and was awarded the Juan Lladó prize for support to culture and cultural research.

== External links (in Spanish) ==
- Ficha biográfica
- Biografía en la Fundación COTEX
- Recopilación de trabajos libros, artículos y colaboraciones de José Ángel Sánchez Asiaín en Dialnet
- Obras de Sánchez Asiaín, en la Biblioteca Virtual Miguel de Cervantes.

Spanish nobility
New title	Marquess of Asiaín; 9 April 2010–31 December 2016	Succeeded by María Paz Sánchez-Asiaín Sanz
