= 1960 South Vietnamese coup attempt =

Failed coup against President Ngô Đình Diệm

- Part of the War in Vietnam (1959–1963) in the Vietnam War
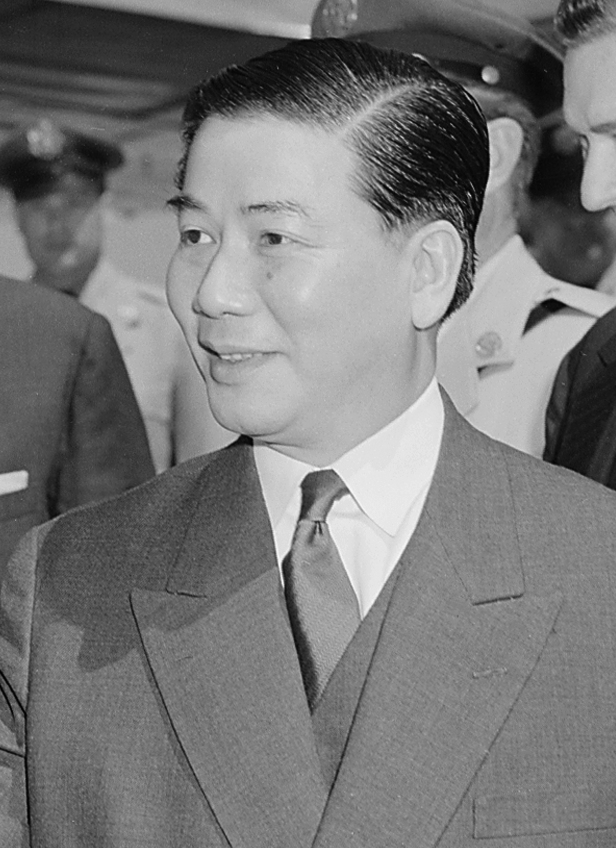
- President Ngô Đình Diệm of South Vietnam
Date	11–12 November 1960
Location	Saigon, South Vietnam 10°46′32″N 106°42′07″E
Result	Coup attempt defeated

Belligerents
ARVN rebels; RVNMD rebels; RVNAD rebels	ARVN loyalists; Presidential Guard

Commanders and leaders
Vương Văn Đông; Nguyễn Chánh Thi; Phạm Văn Liễu; Phan Quang Đán (POW)	Ngô Đình Diệm; Ngô Đình Nhu; Nguyễn Khánh; Nguyễn Văn Thiệu; Trần Thiện Khiêm

Strength
One armoured regiment; One marine unit; Three airborne battalions	ARVN 5th Division; ARVN 7th Division; c. 60 men of the Presidential Guard

Casualties and losses
- Unclear, more than 400 dead on both sides

On 11 November 1960, a failed coup attempt against President Ngô Đình Diệm of South Vietnam was led by Lieutenant Colonel Vương Văn Đông and Colonel Nguyễn Chánh Thi of the Airborne Division of the Army of the Republic of Vietnam (ARVN).

The rebels launched the coup in response to Diệm's autocratic rule and the negative political influence of his brother Ngô Đình Nhu and sister-in-law Madame Nhu. They also bemoaned the politicisation of the military, whereby regime loyalists who were members of the Ngô family's covert Cần Lao Party were readily promoted ahead of more competent officers who were not insiders. Đông was supported in the conspiracy by his brother-in-law Lieutenant Colonel Nguyen Trieu Hong, whose uncle was a prominent official in a minor opposition party. The main link in the coup was Đông's commanding officer Thi, whom he persuaded to join the plot.

The coup caught the Ngô family completely off-guard, but was also chaotically executed. The plotters neglected to seal the roads leading into the capital Saigon to seal off loyalist reinforcements, and they hesitated after gaining the initiative. After initially being trapped inside the Independence Palace, Diệm stalled the coup by holding negotiations and promising reforms, such as the inclusion of military officers in the administration. In the meantime, opposition politicians joined the fray, trying to exploit Diệm's position. However, the president's real aim was to buy time for loyalist forces to enter the capital and relieve him. The coup failed when the 5th and 7th Divisions of the ARVN entered Saigon and defeated the rebels. More than four hundred people—many of whom were civilian spectators—were killed in the ensuing battle. These included a group of anti-Diệm civilians who charged across the palace walls at Thi's urging and were cut down by loyalist gunfire.

Đông and Thi fled to Cambodia, while Diệm berated the United States for a perceived lack of support during the crisis. Afterwards, Diệm ordered a crackdown, imprisoning numerous anti-government critics and former cabinet ministers. Those that assisted Diệm were duly promoted, while those that did not were demoted. A trial for those implicated in the plot was held in 1963. Seven officers and two civilians were sentenced to death in absentia, while 14 officers and 34 civilians were jailed. Diệm's regime also accused the Americans of sending Central Intelligence Agency members to assist the failed plot. When Diệm was assassinated after a 1963 coup, those jailed after the 1960 revolt were released by the new military junta.

== Background ==
The revolt was led by 28-year-old Lieutenant Colonel Vương Văn Đông, a northerner, who had fought with the French Union forces against the Viet Minh during the First Indochina War. Later trained at Fort Leavenworth in the United States, Đông was regarded by American military advisers as a brilliant tactician and the brightest military prospect of his generation and he served in the Airborne Division. Back in Vietnam, Đông became discontented with Diệm's arbitrary rule and constant meddling in the internal affairs of the army. Diệm promoted officers on loyalty rather than skill, and played senior officers against one another in order to weaken the military leadership and prevent them from challenging his rule. Years after the coup, Đông asserted that his sole objective was to force Diệm to improve the governance of the country. Đông was clandestinely supported by his brother-in-law Lieutenant Colonel Nguyen Trieu Hong, the director of training at the Joint General Staff School, and Hong's uncle Hoang Co Thuy. Thuy was a wealthy Saigon-based lawyer, and had been a political activist since World War II. He was the secretary-general of a minority opposition party called the Movement of Struggle for Freedom, which had a small presence in the rubber-stamp National Assembly.

Many Army of the Republic of Vietnam (ARVN) officers were members of other anti-communist nationalist groups that were opposed to Diệm, such as the Đại Việt Quốc dân đảng (Nationalist Party of Greater Vietnam) and the Việt Nam Quốc Dân Đảng (VNQDĐ, Vietnamese Nationalist Party), which were both established before World War II. The VNQDĐ had run a military academy in Yunnan near the Chinese border with the assistance of their nationalist Chinese counterparts, the Kuomintang. Diệm and his family had crushed all alternative anti-communist nationalists, and his politicisation of the army had alienated the servicemen. Officers were promoted on the basis of political allegiance rather than competence, meaning that many VNQDĐ and Đại Việt trained officers were denied such promotions. They felt that politically minded officers, who joined Diệm's secret Catholic-dominated Cần Lao Party, which was used to control South Vietnamese society, were rewarded with promotion rather than those most capable.

Planning for the coup had gone on for over a year, with Đông recruiting disgruntled officers. This included his commander, Colonel Nguyễn Chánh Thi. In 1955, Thi had fought for Diệm against the Bình Xuyên organised crime syndicate in the Battle for Saigon. This performance so impressed Diệm—a lifelong bachelor—that he thereafter referred to Thi as "my son". However, the Americans who worked with Thi were less impressed. The CIA described Thi as "an opportunist and a man lacking strong convictions". An American military advisor described Thi as "tough, unscrupulous, and fearless, but dumb". There is some dispute as to whether Thi participated in the coup of his free choice. According to some sources, Thi was still an admirer of Diệm and was forced at gunpoint by Đông and his supporters to join the coup at the last minute, having been kept unaware of the plotting. According to this story, Thi's airborne units were initially moved into position for the coup without his knowledge.

Many months before the coup, Đông had met Diệm's brother and adviser Ngô Đình Nhu, widely regarded as the brains of the regime, to ask for reform and de-politicisation of the army. Đông said that the meeting went well and was hopeful that Nhu would enact change. However, a few weeks later, Dong and his collaborators were transferred to different commands and physically separated. Fearing that Diệm and Nhu were trying to throw their plans off balance, they accelerated their planning work, and decided to move on October 6. However, they were then scheduled to go into battle against the Viet Cong (VC) near Kon Tum in the II Corps in the Central Highlands, forcing a postponement. According to the historian George McTurnan Kahin, Đông was without a command by the time the coup was held.

The Americans started to notice and become alarmed at increasing reports of political disillusionment in the military officer corps in August. An intelligence report prepared by the US State Department in late August claimed the "worsening of internal security, the promotion of incompetent officers and Diệm's direct interference in army operations ... his political favoritism, inadequate delegation of authority, and the influence of the Can Lao". It also claimed that discontent with Diệm among high-ranking civil servants was at their highest point since the president had established in power, and that the bureaucrats wanted a change of leadership, through a coup if needed. It was said that Nhu and his wife were the most despised among the civil service. The report predicted that if a coup was to occur, the objective would probably be to force Nhu and his wife out of positions of power and allow Diệm to continue to lead the country with reduced power, should he be willing to do so. The intelligence analysis turned out to be correct.

The US Ambassador Elbridge Durbrow, who had been in the post since 1957, had a long record of trying to pressure Diệm into political reforms. He felt that South Vietnam's political problems were due to Diệm's illiberalism and thought the communist insurgency would be more easily defeated if Diệm reached out to a broader cross-section of society, cracked down on corruption, cronyism, abusive public servants, and implemented land reform. However, the South Vietnamese president saw authoritarianism as the solution to political problems and opposition, and the US military hierarchy in Vietnam agreed, leading to frequent disputes between Durbrow and the Military Assistance Advisory Group (MAAG). Durbrow frequently reported to Washington that Diệm's strong-arm tactics against opposition only created more dissent and opportunities for the communists.

Around this time, Durbrow began to advise Diệm to remove Nhu and his wife from the government, basing his arguments on a need to cultivate broad popular support to make South Vietnam more viable in the long term. His key suggestions included Nhu being sent abroad as an ambassador, removing Nhu's wife and intelligence director Tran Kim Tuyen from public power and sending them overseas, new defense and interior ministers, and "altering the nature of the Cần Lao Party" to acknowledge its existence and operations in public. These proposals were endorsed by the State Department and delivered to Diem. As Nhu and the Can Lao were a core means of his keeping power, Diệm did not follow Durbrow's advice, and was reported to have become angry when Durbrow suggested that corruption and political favoritism was diminished the government's effectiveness.

On September 16, after another fruitless meeting with Diệm, Durbrow reported to Washington: "If Diệm's position in [the] country continues to deteriorate ... it may become necessary for [the] US government to begin consideration [of] alternative courses of action and leaders in order [to] achieve our objective." In another State Department Report, it was concluded that a coup would become more likely "if Diệm continued to remain uncompromising and if the opposition felt that the United States would not be unsympathetic to a coup or that U.S.–Vietnamese relations would not be seriously damaged." As it turned out those in Vietnam discontented with Diệm reached the same conclusion, that the US would not mind them toppling the president.

The coup was organised with the help of some VNQDĐ and Đại Việt members, civilians and officers alike. Đông enlisted the cooperation of an armoured regiment, marine unit and three paratrooper battalions. The marine battalion was commanded by Lieutenant Colonel Phạm Văn Liễu. The operation was scheduled to launch on 11 November at 05:00. However, the airborne soldiers were not aware of what their officers had in store. They were told that they were heading into the countryside to attack the VC. Once they were on their way, the officers claimed that the Presidential Guard, who were meant to guard the presidential palace, had mutinied against Diệm.

== Coup ==
According to Stanley Karnow, the Pulitzer Prize-winning author of Vietnam: A History, the coup was ineffectively executed; although the rebels captured the headquarters of the Joint General Staff near Tan Son Nhut Air Base, they failed to follow the textbook tactics of blocking the roads leading into Saigon. While they captured Saigon's principal telephone exchange at the central post office, they failed to secure a secondary system that was located in the basement. This meant that phone lines into the palace remained intact, which allowed Diệm to call for aid from loyal units. Most notably, the director of the post office, who remained loyal, was able to call Diem's director of intelligence Tran Kim Tuyen, allowing him to summon loyalist forces.

The paratroopers headed down the main thoroughfare of Saigon towards Independence Palace. At first, the forces encircled the compound without attacking, believing that Diệm would comply with their demands. Đông attempted to call on US ambassador Durbrow to put pressure on Diệm. Durbrow, although a persistent critic of Diệm, maintained his government's position of supporting Diệm, stating "We support this government until it fails". Durbrow later recalled receiving a telephone call from an aide to Diệm who insisted that he call Diệm and tell him to surrender or face a howitzer attack on the palace. Durbrow refused and no attack took place. He consequently learned that the aide was forced to make the call.

Most of the rebel soldiers had been told that they were attacking in order to save Diệm from a mutiny by the Presidential Guard. Only one or two officers in any given rebel unit knew the true situation. A high wall, a fence and a few guard posts, surrounded the palace grounds. The mutinous paratroopers disembarked from their transport vehicles and moved into position for an attack on the main gate. Some ran forward and others raked automatic gunfire at the front of the palace, shattering most of the windows and puncturing the walls. Diệm was nearly killed in the opening salvoes. A rebel machine gun fired into Diệm's bedroom window from the adjacent Palais de Justice and penetrated his bed, but the president had arisen just a few minutes earlier.

The paratroopers' first assault on the palace met with surprising resistance. The Presidential Guardsmen who stood between the rebels and Diệm were estimated at between 30 and 60, but they managed to repel the initial thrust and kill seven rebels who attempted to scale the palace walls and run across the grass. The rebels cordoned off the palace and held fire. They trucked in reinforcements and the attack restarted at 7:30, but the Presidential Guard continued to resist. Half an hour later, the rebels brought in five armored vehicles and circumnavigated the palace. They fired at the perimeter posts, and mortared the palace grounds. However, the exchange had petered out by 10:30. In the meantime, the rebels had captured the National Police offices, Radio Saigon and the Cộng Hòa barracks of the Presidential Guard. They had also put most of the Saigon-based generals under house arrest, meaning that Diệm's saviours would have to come from outside Saigon. However, the rebels also suffered a setback when Hong was killed during the battle for the police headquarters. He had been sitting in his jeep behind the frontline when he was hit by stray gunfire.

Diệm headed for the cellar, joining his younger brother and confidant Nhu, and his wife Madame Nhu. Brigadier General Nguyễn Khánh, at the time the ARVN Chief of Staff, climbed over the palace wall to reach Diệm during the siege, as the Presidential Guard had been under explicit orders to not open the gates. Khanh lived in the city center, close to the palace, and awoken by the gunfire, he drove towards the action. The plotters had tried to put him under house arrest at the start of the coup, but were unaware that he had moved house. Khanh proceeded to coordinate the loyalist defenders, along with Ky Quang Liem, the deputy director of the Civil Guard. The pair managed to trick the rebels into allowing a column of tanks drive past, which were later turned against the rebels.

At dawn, civilians began massing outside the palace gates, verbally encouraging the rebels and waving banners advocating regime change. Radio Saigon announced that a "Revolutionary Council" was in charge of South Vietnam's government. Diệm appeared lost, while many Saigon-based ARVN troops rallied to the insurgents. According to Nguyễn Thái Bình, an exiled political rival, "Diệm was lost. Any other than he would have capitulated." However, the rebels hesitated as they decided their next move. There was debate on what Diệm's role would be in future. Thi felt that the rebels should take the opportunity of storming the palace and capturing Diệm, or using artillery if necessary. Đông on the other hand, was worried that Diệm could be killed in an attack. Đông felt that despite Diệm's shortcomings, the president was South Vietnam's best available leader, believing that enforced reform would yield the best outcome. The rebels wanted Nhu and his wife out of the government, although they disagreed over whether to kill or deport the couple.

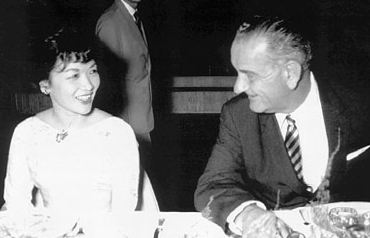
The rebels demanded the removal of First Lady Madame Nhu (pictured left, with Lyndon Johnson)

Thi demanded that Diệm appoint an officer as prime minister and that Diệm remove Madame Nhu from the palace. Saigon Radio broadcast a speech authorised by Thi's Revolutionary Council, claiming that Diệm was being removed because he was corrupt and suppressed liberty. Worried by the uprising, Diệm sent his private secretary Vo Van Hai to negotiate with the coup leaders. In the afternoon, Khanh left the palace to meet with rebel officers to keep abreast of their demands, which they reiterated. The rebels' negotiators were Đông and Major Nguyen Huy Loi. They wanted officers and opposition figures to be appointed to a new government to keep Diệm in check, but with Hong—who was meant to supposed to be the primary negotiator—dead, Dong was uncertain as to what to demand. At one stage, Dong wanted Diem to remain as a "supreme advisory" to a transitional regime made up of military officers and civilians.

The plotters unilaterally named Brigadier General Lê Văn Kim, the head of the Vietnamese National Military Academy, the nation's premier officer training school in Da Lat, would be their new prime minister. Kim was not a Can Lao member and was later put under house arrest after Diệm regained control. According to Kim's brother-in-law, Major General Trần Văn Đôn, Kim was willing to accept the post but was not going to say anything unless the coup succeeded. The rebels also suggested that Diệm appoint General Lê Văn Tỵ, the chief of the armed forces, be made defence minister. Diệm asked Ty, who had been put under house arrest by the plotters, if he was willing, but the officer was not. During the afternoon of 11 November, the rebels used Ty as an intermediary to pass on their demands to the president. A broadcast was made over Saigon Radio, during which Ty said he had consulted with Diệm and obtained his agreement for the "dissolution of the present government" and that "with agreement of the Revolutionary Council" had given the officers the task of constituting "a provisional military government".

Phan Quang Đán joined the rebellion and acted as the rebels' spokesman. The most prominent political critic of Diệm, Đán had been disqualified from the 1959 legislative election after winning his seat by a ratio of 6:1 despite Diệm having organised votestacking against him. He cited political mismanagement of the war against the Viet Cong and the government's refusal to broaden its political base as the reason for the revolt. Đán spoke on Radio Vietnam and staged a media conference during which a rebel paratrooper pulled a portrait of the president from the wall, ripped it and stamped on it. In the meantime, Thuy went about organising a coalition of political parties to take over post-Diệm. He had already lined up the VNQDĐ, Đại Việt, and the Hòa Hảo and Cao Đài religious movements, and was seeking more collaborators.

Khanh returned to the palace and reported the result of his conversation to the Ngos. He recommended that Diệm resign due to the demands of the rebel forces and protestors outside the palace. Madame Nhu railed against Diệm agreeing to a power-sharing arrangement, asserting that it was the destiny of Diệm and his family to save the country. Madame Nhu's aggressive stance and persistent calls for Khanh to attack, prompted the general to threaten to leave. This forced Diệm to silence his sister-in-law, and Khanh remained with the president.

During the standoff, Durbrow ambivalently noted "We consider it overriding importance to Vietnam and Free World that agreement be reached soonest in order avoid continued division, further bloodshed with resultant fatal weakening Vietnam's ability [to] resist communists." American representatives privately recommended to both sides to reach a peaceful agreement to share power.

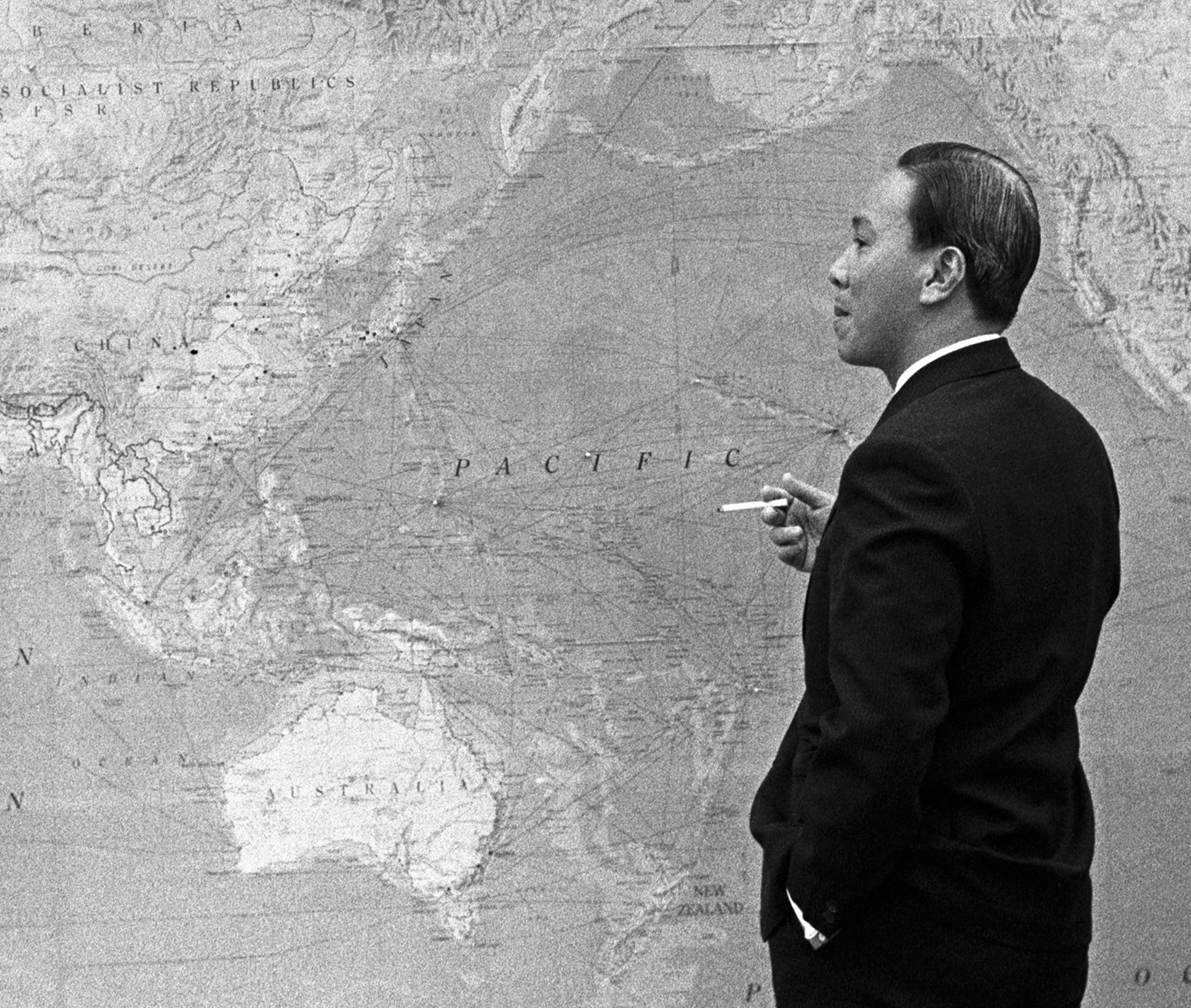
The Fifth Division of Colonel Nguyễn Văn Thiệu (pictured) helped rescue Diệm from the rebels.

In the meantime, the negotiations allowed time for loyalists to enter Saigon and rescue the president. Khanh used the remaining communication lines to message senior officers outside Saigon. The Fifth Division of Colonel Nguyễn Văn Thiệu, a future president, brought infantry forces from Biên Hòa, a town north of Saigon. The Seventh Division of Colonel Trần Thiện Khiêm brought in seven infantry battalions and tanks from the Second Armored Battalion from Mỹ Tho, a town in the Mekong Delta south of Saigon. Khiêm was a Catholic with ties to Diệm's older brother, Archbishop Ngô Đình Thục. Khanh also convinced Lê Nguyên Khang, the acting head of the Republic of Vietnam Marine Corps to send the 1st and 2nd Marine Battalions. Rangers were called into Saigon from the western town of Tây Ninh. Assistant Secretary of Defense Nguyễn Đình Thuận phoned Durbrow and discussed the impending standoff between the incoming loyalists and the rebels. Durbrow said "I hope that the Revolutionary Committee and President Diệm can get together and agree to cooperate as a civil war could only benefit communists. If one side or the other has to make some concessions in order [to] reach an agreement, I believe that would be desirable to ensure unity against the communists." Durbrow was worried that if he sided with one faction over the other, and that group was defeated, the United States would be saddled with a hostile regime.

Diệm advised Khanh to continue to negotiate with the paratroopers and seek a rapprochement. After consenting to formal negotiations, the parties agreed to a ceasefire. In the meantime, loyalist forces continued to head towards the capital, while the rebels publicly claimed on radio that Diệm had surrendered in an apparent attempt to attract more troops to their cause. Diệm promised to end press censorship, liberalise the economy, and hold free and fair elections. Diệm refused to sack Nhu, but he agreed to dissolve his cabinet and form a government that would accommodate the Revolutionary Council. In the early hours of 12 November, Diệm taped a speech detailing the concessions, which the rebels broadcast on Saigon Radio. In it he expressed his intention to "coordinate with the Revolutionary Council to establish a coalition government".

As the speech was being aired, two infantry divisions and supporting loyal armour approached the palace grounds. Some of these had broken through the rebel encirclement by falsely claiming to be anti-Diệm reinforcements, before setting up their positions next to the palace. The loyalists opened fire with mortars and machine guns, and both sides exchanged fire for a few hours. During the morning, Durbrow tried to stop the fighting, phoning Diệm to say that if the violence was not stopped, "the entire population will rise up against both loyalists and rebels, and the communists will take over the city. If a bloodbath is not avoided, all of Vietnam will go communist in a very short time." Durbrow deplored the attempt to resolve the situation with force. Diệm blamed the rebels for causing the outbreak of fighting and the collapse of the power-sharing deal. Some of the Saigon-based units that had joined the rebellion sensed that Diệm had regained the upper hand and switched sides for the second time in two days. The paratroopers became outnumbered and were forced to retreat to defensive positions around their barracks, which was an ad hoc camp that had been set up in a public park approximately 1 kilometre (0.62 mi) away. After a brief but violent battle that killed around 400 people, the coup attempt was crushed. This included a large number of civilians, who had been engaging in anti-Diệm protests outside the palace grounds. Thi exhorted them to bring down the Ngos by charging the palace, and 13 were gunned down by the loyalist soldiers from the 2nd Armored Battalion as they invaded the grounds. The others dispersed quickly.

== Aftermath ==
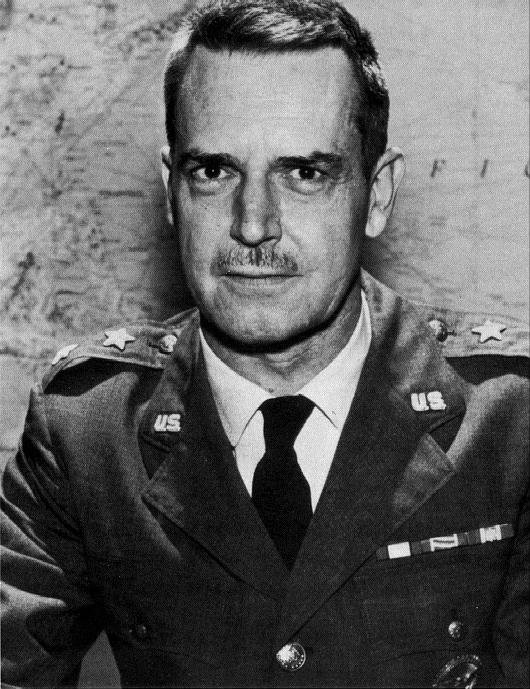
Colonel Lansdale (pictured here as a major general), a CIA officer who assisted Diệm in the past, called for the removal of the US ambassador to Saigon

After the failed coup, Đông, Thi, Liễu and several other prominent officers fled to Tan Son Nhut and climbed aboard a C-47. They fled to Cambodia, where they were happily given asylum by Prince Norodom Sihanouk. Cambodia and South Vietnam had been on bad terms; Cambodia turned a blind eye to the VC using their territory as a staging ground, while Diệm and Nhu had tried to foment opposition and had supported attempts to overthrow the Cambodian leader. Nhu had failed in a 1959 attempt to assassinate Sihanouk with a parcel bomb, and both nations' leaders despised one another.

Diệm promptly reneged on his promises, and began rounding up scores of critics, including several former cabinet ministers and some of the Caravelle Group of 18 who had released a petition calling for reform. One of Diệm's first orders after re-establishing command was to order the arrest of Dan, who was imprisoned and tortured.

For Diệm and his family, the failed coup was a turning point in relations with the US support, which had generally been unconditional and strong since 1955. He felt the US had let him down and that some Americans had been encouraging his overthrow and undermining his rule. He had previously thought the Americans had full support for him, but afterwards, he told his confidants that he felt like Syngman Rhee, the President of the anti-communist South Korea who had been strongly backed by Washington until being deposed earlier in 1960, a regime change Diệm saw as US-backed. Diệm's opponents felt the same way about the similarities to Korea. Liễu later told Kahin "We had no worry about getting continued American assistance if we were successful; we felt we could count on it, just like Park did when he overthrew Rhee." Kahin also wrote that several senior officers including a senior figure in the coup, whom he did not name, were "explicit in charging American encouragement of the rebels".

In the wake of the failed coup, Diệm blamed Durbrow for a perceived lack of US support, while his brother Nhu further accused the ambassador of colluding with the rebels. Durbrow denied this in later years, saying that he had been "100% in support of Diệm". In January 1961, Diệm told Kahin of his belief the US had been involved, while Nhu told Karnow "the principal culprits in the revolt were the 'western embassies' and individual Americans in particular ... American military advisers were helping the paratroopers during the revolt." In May 1961, Nhu said "[t]he least you can say ... is that the State Department was neutral between a friendly government and rebels who tried to put that government down ... and the official attitude of the Americans during that coup was not at all the attitude the President would have expected". For Diệm, that Durbrow had called for restraint was an indication he saw Diệm and the rebels as equals, something Diệm saw as anathema. Durbrow called for Diệm to treat the remaining rebel leaders leniently, stressing the need for Diệm to "unify all elements of the country", but Diệm was adamantly opposed to this, angrily rebuffing the ambassador, saying "You apparently do not understand that the rebels caused much blood-letting", accusing them having "duped" innocent people. Diệm also sent Gene Gregory, an American supporter who edited the Times of Vietnam—an English-language newspaper operated as a mouthpiece for the Nhus and known for stridently attacking Ngô family opponents—to meet Durbrow with concrete evidence of "American support of and complicity in the coup". From the coup onwards, Diệm became increasingly suspicious of Washington's policies. He was also angry with US media coverage of the coup, which depicted Diệm as authoritarian and the revolt as a manifestation of widespread discontent. Diệm instead viewed opposition simply as troublemakers.

The American military establishment strongly backed Diệm. Colonel Edward Lansdale, a CIA officer who helped entrench Diệm in power in 1955, ridiculed Durbrow's comments and called on the Eisenhower administration to recall the ambassador. Lansdale said that "It is most doubtful that Ambassador Durbrow has any personal stature remaining. Diệm must feel that Durbrow sided with the rebels emotionally. Perhaps he feels that Durbrow's remarks over the months helped incite the revolt." Lansdale criticised Durbrow: "At the most critical moment of the coup, the U.S. Ambassador urged Diệm to give in to rebel demands to avoid bloodshed." Lieutenant General Lionel McGarr, the new MAAG commander, agreed with Lansdale. McGarr had been in contact with both the rebel and loyalist units during the standoff and credited the failure of the coup to the "courageous action of Diệm coupled with loyalty and versatility of commanders bringing troops into Saigon". McGarr asserted that "Diệm has emerged from this severe test in position of greater strength with visible proof of sincere support behind him both in armed forces and civilian population." General Lyman Lemnitzer, the chairman of the US Joint Chiefs of Staff said that "When you have rebellious forces against you, you have to act forcibly and not restrain your friends. The main point is that sometimes bloodshed can't be avoided and that those in power must act decisively." The State Department advised President Eisenhower to send Diệm a congratulatory message, but Durbrow objected, arguing that Diệm would interpret the message as an unqualified endorsement of his rule and prevent him from "grasping and heeding lessons of [the] coup".

Diệm later implicated two Americans, George Carver and Russ Miller for involvement in the plot. Both had spent the coup attempt with the rebel officers. Durbrow had sent them there to keep track of the situation, but Diệm felt that they were there to encourage the uprising; the coup group's desired changes were very similar to those advocated by Durbrow in previous months. It was later revealed that Carver had friendly relations with the coup leaders and then arranged for Thuy to be evacuated from South Vietnam when the loyalists overwhelmed the paratroopers. Carver had also spent some of the coup period in a meeting with civilian rebel leaders at Thuy's house, although it is not known if he pro-actively encouraged Diệm opponents. The Ngô brothers indicated to the Americans that Carver should be deported, and soon after, Carver received a death warrant. The threat was supposedly signed by the coup leaders, who were ostensibly angry because Carver had abandoned them and withdrawn American support for them. The Americans thought that Nhu was the real culprit, but told the Ngô family that they were removing Carver from the country for his own safety, thereby allowing all parties to avoid embarrassment. Years later, Carver said he agreed with the rebels' thinking that Diệm was doing poorly and needed to be replaced, saying he was "absolutely convinced" that a regime change was needed to "achieve American objective in Vietnam". In his memoir, Don claimed Miller had cryptically encouraged him to overthrow Diệm a few months before the coup attempt.

The rift between American diplomatic and military representatives in South Vietnam began to grow. In the meantime, Durbrow continued his policy of pressuring Diệm to liberalize his regime. Durbrow saw the coup as a sign that Diệm was unpopular and with the South Vietnamese president making only token changes, the ambassador informed Washington that Diệm might have to be removed. However, in December, the Assistant Secretary of State for Far Eastern Affairs J. Graham Parsons told Durbrow to stop, cabling "Believe for present Embassy has gone as far as feasible in pushing for liberalization and future exhortation likely to be counterproductive."

The tensions between the palace and the US was mirrored in the ARVN. The paratroopers had been regarded as the most loyal of the ARVN's units, so Diệm intensified his policy of promoting officers based on loyalty rather than competence. Khiêm was made a general and appointed Army Chief of Staff. The Ngô brothers were so paranoid that they felt that Khanh was suspect as he had broken through the rebel lines too easily. Khanh's action gained him a reputation of having helped the president, but he was later criticised for having a foot in both camps. Critics claimed that Khanh had been on good terms with the rebels and decided against rebelling when it was clear that Diệm would win. Khanh was later dispatched to the Central Highlands as the commander of II Corps. General Dương Văn Minh, who did not come to Diệm's defense during the siege and instead stayed at home, was demoted. During the revolt, the plotters had nominated Minh to become their Defence Minister, but he refused when Diệm contacted him, claiming that he would willingly fight for Diệm on the battlefield, but was neither interested in nor suited for politics. However, Minh did not come to assist Diệm, and the president responded by appointing him to the post of Presidential Military Advisor, where he had no influence or troops to command in case the thought of coup ever crossed his mind. Minh and Lieutenant General Tran Van Don, the commander of the 1st Division in central Vietnam, but who was in Saigon when the coup attempt occurred, were the subject of a military investigation by the regime, but were cleared of involvement by junior officers appointed by Diem. Don's brother-in-law Kim, was also subjected to formal investigation, and placed under house arrest for a few weeks after the coup attempt. Despite being cleared of any wrongdoing, he was removed from his post as the director of the National Military Academy and transferred to Minh's unit.

Lansdale continued to be critical of Durbrow, and wanted to replace him as ambassador. Two months later, the incoming US President John F. Kennedy started a review of Washington's stance with regards to Saigon. Lansdale's report predicted South Vietnam's demise, and along with it, the rest of South East Asia and US preeminence in global affairs, unless a new direction was found. He blamed what he saw as Durbrow's poor judgement for the problems in the alliance, and that the current ambassador could not work effectively anymore because he had "sympathized strongly" with the coup. Without explicitly suggesting himself, Lansdale said that Durbrow had to be replaced with someone "with marked leadership talents" and the ability to "influence Asians through understanding them sympathetically". Lansdale called Diệm "the only Vietnamese with executive ability and the required determination to be an effective President" and said the new ambassador needed thus needed to have a rapport with him. Lansdale said Diệm was comfortable with MAAG and the CIA, but felt that diplomats were "very close to those who tried to kill him on 11 November". During the meeting at which these matters were discussed, there was strong agreement that Durbrow's position in Saigon had become untenable. Lansdale's submissions were seen as being important in Kennedy's decision to replace Durbrow with Frederick Nolting in May 1961. Nolting was a mild man who was seen as unlikely to pressure Diệm to reform and therefore upset him. Kennedy was thought to have seriously contemplated the appointment of Lansdale, before encountering complaints from sections of the State and Defense Departments, among them Defense Secretary Robert McNamara. Kennedy also increased funding for Diệm immediately and made a show of support for the Vietnamese leader at the advice of Lansdale.

== Trial ==
The trial of those charged with involvement in the coup occurred more than two years later in mid-1963. Diệm scheduled the hearing in the middle of the Buddhist crisis, a move that was interpreted as an attempt to deter the populace from further dissent. Nineteen officers and 34 civilians were accused of complicity in the coup and called before the Special Military Court.

Diệm's officials gave the Americans an unsubtle warning not to interfere. The official prosecutor claimed to have documents proving that a foreign power was behind the failed coup but said that he could not publicly name the nation in question. It was later revealed in secret proceedings that he pinpointed two Americans: George Carver, an employee of the United States Operations Mission (an economic mission) who was later revealed to be a CIA agent, and Howard C. Elting, described as the deputy chief of the American mission in Saigon.

One of the prominent civilians summoned to appear before the military tribunal was a well-known novelist who wrote under the pen name of Nhat Linh. He was the VNQDĐ leader Nguyễn Tường Tam, who had been Ho Chi Minh's foreign affairs minister in 1946. Tam had abandoned his post rather than lead the delegation to the Fontainebleau Conference and make concessions to the French Union. In the 30 months since the failed putsch, the police had not taken the conspiracy claims seriously enough to arrest Tam, but when Tam learned of the trial, he committed suicide by ingesting cyanide. He left a death note stating "I also will kill myself as a warning to those people who are trampling on all freedom", referring to Thích Quảng Đức, the monk who self-immolated in protest against Diệm's persecution of Buddhism. Tam's suicide was greeted with a mixed reception. Although some felt that it upheld the Vietnamese tradition of choosing death over humiliation, some VNQDĐ members considered Tam's actions to be romantic and sentimental.

The brief trial opened on 8 July 1963. The seven officers and two civilians who had fled the country after the failed coup were found guilty and sentenced to death in absentia. Five officers were acquitted, while the remainder were imprisoned for terms ranging from five to ten years. Another VNQDĐ leader Vũ Hồng Khanh was given six years in prison. Former Diệm cabinet minister Phan Khắc Sửu was sentenced to eight years, mainly for being a signatory of the Caravelle Group which called on Diệm to reform. Dan, the spokesman was sentenced to seven years. Fourteen of the civilians were acquitted, including Tam.

However, the prisoners' time in prison was brief, as Diệm was deposed and killed in a coup in November 1963. On 8 November, political opponents who had been imprisoned on the island of Poulo Condore were released by the military junta. Đán was garlanded and taken to military headquarters, and on 10 November, Suu was released and welcomed by a large crowd at the town hall. Suu later served as president for a brief period and Dan as a deputy prime minister. Thi, Đông and Liễu returned to South Vietnam and resumed their service in the ARVN.
