= Chinese American Bank =

Coordinates: 40°42′59″N 73°59′45″W

- Company type: Private
- Industry: Finance and Insurance
- Founded: 1967
- Defunct: 2007
- Fate: Acquired by United Commercial Bank
- Headquarters: New York City, New York, U.S.
- Products: Banking

The Chinese American Bank (Chinese: 中美銀行) was an overseas Chinese bank in the United States headquartered in New York City, with branch offices in Chinatown, Manhattan and in Chinatown, Flushing.

The privately owned community bank was established in 1967 to serve the Chinatown community. A burgeoning community of Chinese immigrants in the Flushing Chinatown prompted the bank to open another branch there.

The Chinese American Bank was acquired by United Commercial Bank in the second quarter of 2007; United Commercial Bank later went defunct and was acquired by East West Bank in November 2009.
