= Far East National Bank =

Bank in California, United States

Far East National Bank (FENB; Chinese: 遠東國民銀行) was founded in 1974 by Henry Y. Hwang as the first federally chartered Asian American bank in the United States. FENB has over 600 employees and total assets exceeding US$1.7 billion. It became a wholly owned subsidiary of Taiwan's Bank Sinopac in 1997. Services are provided through nine branches throughout the Los Angeles and San Francisco areas. The bank opened its first overseas branch in Ho Chi Minh City, Vietnam, in October 2004. The corporate headquarters is at Chinatown Los Angeles.

In July 2017, SinoPac Holdings,the parent company of Bank SinoPac,sold Far East National Bank to Cathay Bank, and Far East National Bank was merged into Cathay Bank in November 2017 .

== Trivia ==
- Henry Y. Hwang, the founder of Far East National Bank, is the father of Tony Award winning playwright David Henry Hwang, and appears as a major character in David's play Yellow Face.
