= Los Angeles National Bank =

Overseas Chinese bank

- Company type: Private
- Industry: Finance and Insurance
- Founded: December 18, 1973; 52 years ago
- Defunct: May 2013; 13 years ago
- Fate: Acquired by Royal Business Bank
- Headquarters: Buena Park, California
- Key people: Johnson M. Tsai, CEO; Angela Chi, CFO
- Products: Banking
- Website: www.lanbusa.com

Los Angeles National Bank (Chinese: 世界華商銀行) was an overseas Chinese bank in the United States. Headquartered in Buena Park, California, with branch offices in Silver Lake, Los Angeles and Monterey Park, the privately held community bank was first established on December 18, 1973.

In contrast to other traditional overseas Chinese bank in the United States of its era that primarily served the local disadvantaged ethnic populace, the Los Angeles National Bank primarily focused on small to medium-size businesses of $1 million to $30 million in annual sales, and the executive, retail, and professional community consisting predominantly of business owners and executives, doctors, attorneys, accountants, and dentists.

The bank also has similarity with other traditional overseas Chinese bank in the United States of its era in that it concentrated on serving the local Chinese communities, but its clients were upper middle class in comparison to its counterparts, and while it did not have as many offices as its counterparts in California, it did have a representative offices in Flushing, Queens for expansion purposes.

In May 2013, the bank was acquired by Royal Business Bank for an undisclosed amount.
