= Taichung Bank =

Taiwanese bank

Taichung Bank 台中銀行
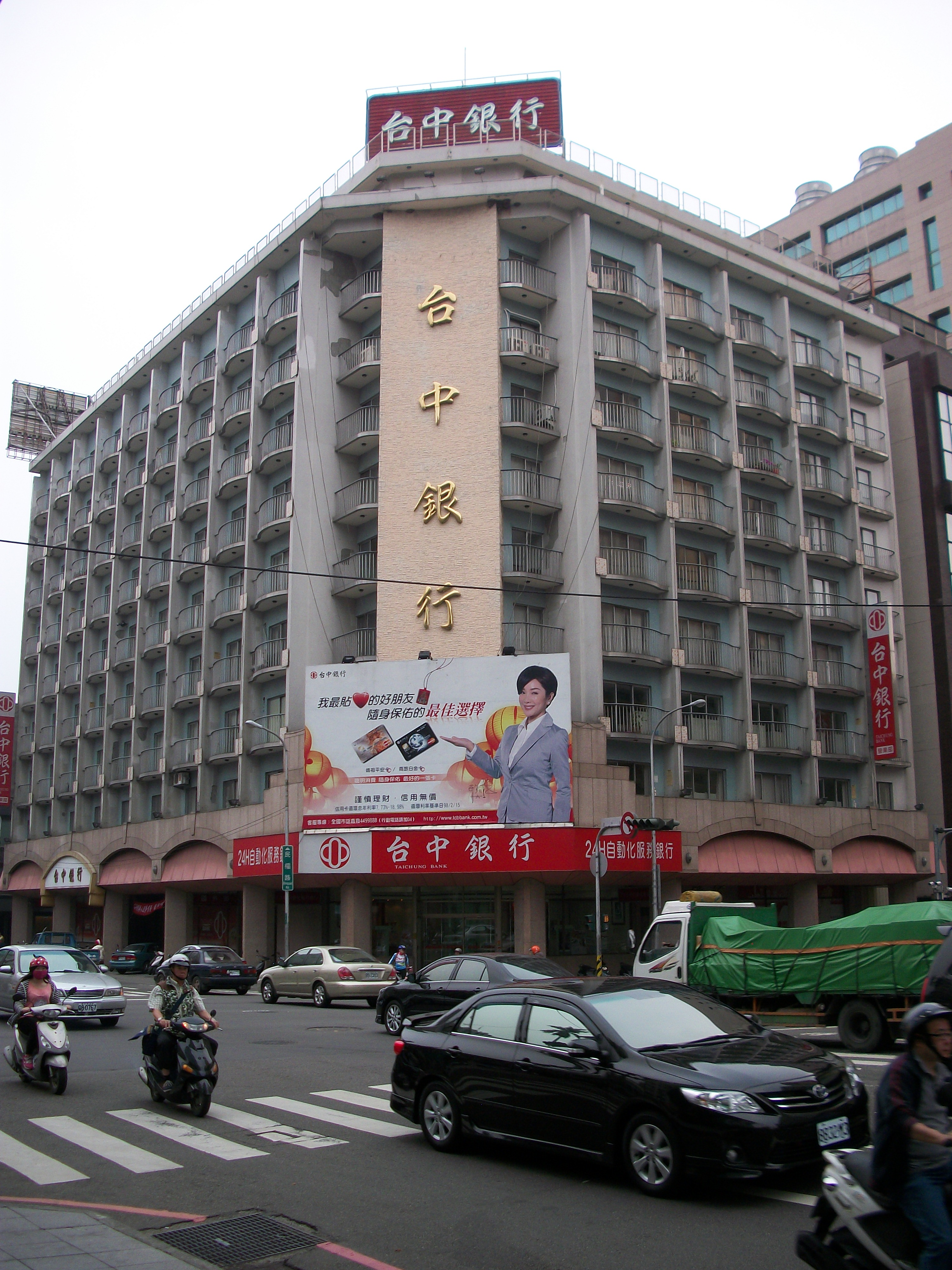
- Company type: Public (TSEC:2812)
- Industry: Banking
- Founded: April 1953
- Headquarters: Taichung, Taiwan
- Key people: Lee, Chun Sheng, Chairman
- Products: Financial services
- Revenue: ▲NTD 4.14 billion (2015)
- Net income: ▲NTD 3.40 billion (2015)
- Number of employees: 2,197 (2015.12)
- Website: www.tcbbank.com.tw

The Taichung Bank (Chinese: 台中銀行; pinyin: Táizhōng Yínháng; Pe̍h-ōe-jī: Tâi-tiong-gîn-hâng), officially Taichung Commercial Bank, is a public bank headquartered in Taichung, Taiwan.

In 2015, Fitch Ratings assigned ratings to Taiwan's Taichung Commercial Bank (TCB) as follows: 'BB+' (BB plus) Long-term Issuer Default Rating (IDR), 'B' Short-term IDR, 'A-(twn)' National Long-term rating, 'F2(twn)' National Short-term rating, 'bb+' Individual rating, '5' Support rating and 'NF' Support Rating Floor.

In October 2022, the institution's board of directors announced that Taichung Bank was planning to acquire the American Continental Bank.

== History ==
The Bank was formerly the Taichung District Joint Saving Company that was approved and established in April 1953.

== See also ==
- List of banks in Taiwan
- List of companies of Taiwan
- Economy of Taiwan
