= Lê Duẩn Boulevard =

Boulevard in Ho Chi Minh City, Vietnam

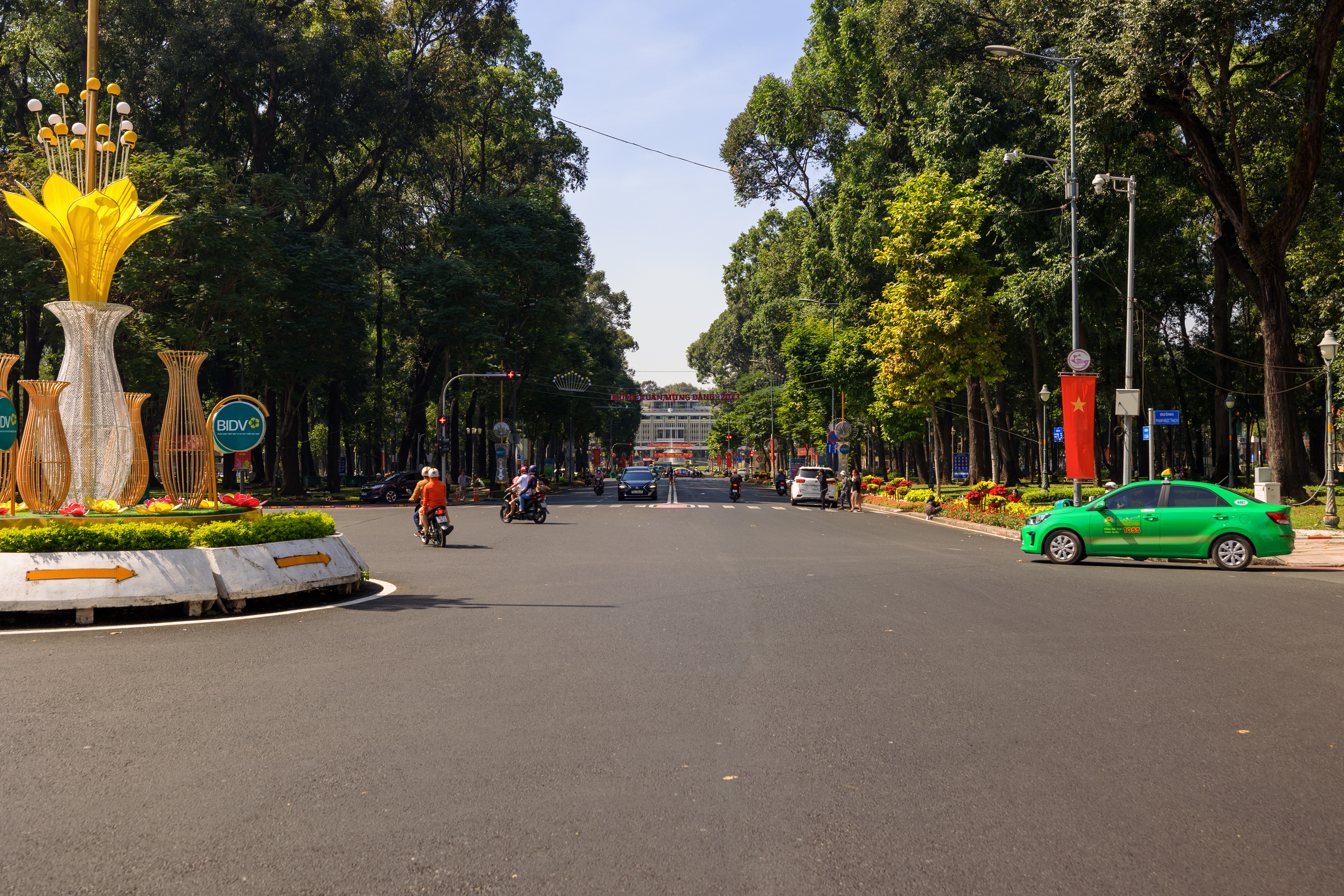
- Le Duan Boulevard in 2023
- Interactive map of Lê Duẩn Boulevard
- Native name: Đường Lê Duẩn, Đại lộ Lê Duẩn (Vietnamese)
- Former names: Norodom Boulevard; Thong Nhut Boulevard; April 30 Boulevard
- Owner: Ho Chi Minh City
- Location: District 1, Ho Chi Minh City
- Coordinates: 10°46′51″N 106°41′57″E
- Southwest end: Independence Palace, Nam Kỳ Khởi Nghĩa Street
- Major junctions: Pasteur Street; Phạm Ngọc Thạch Street – Paris Commune Square; Hai Bà Trưng Street; Mạc Đĩnh Chi Street; Đinh Tiên Hoàng Street – Tôn Đức Thắng Boulevard
- Northeast end: Saigon Zoo and Botanical Gardens, Nguyễn Bỉnh Khiêm Street

Lê Duẩn Boulevard (Vietnamese: Đường Lê Duẩn / Đại lộ Lê Duẩn) is a boulevard in District 1, downtown Ho Chi Minh City, Vietnam. The boulevard stretches from Nam Kỳ Khởi Nghĩa Street, right across from the Independence Palace, across the April 30 Park, to Nguyễn Bỉnh Khiêm Street, right across from the Saigon Zoo and Botanical Gardens.

The offices of the United States Consulate General, British Consulate General, France Consulate General, Netherlands Consulate General and German Consulate General are located on this boulevard.

== History ==
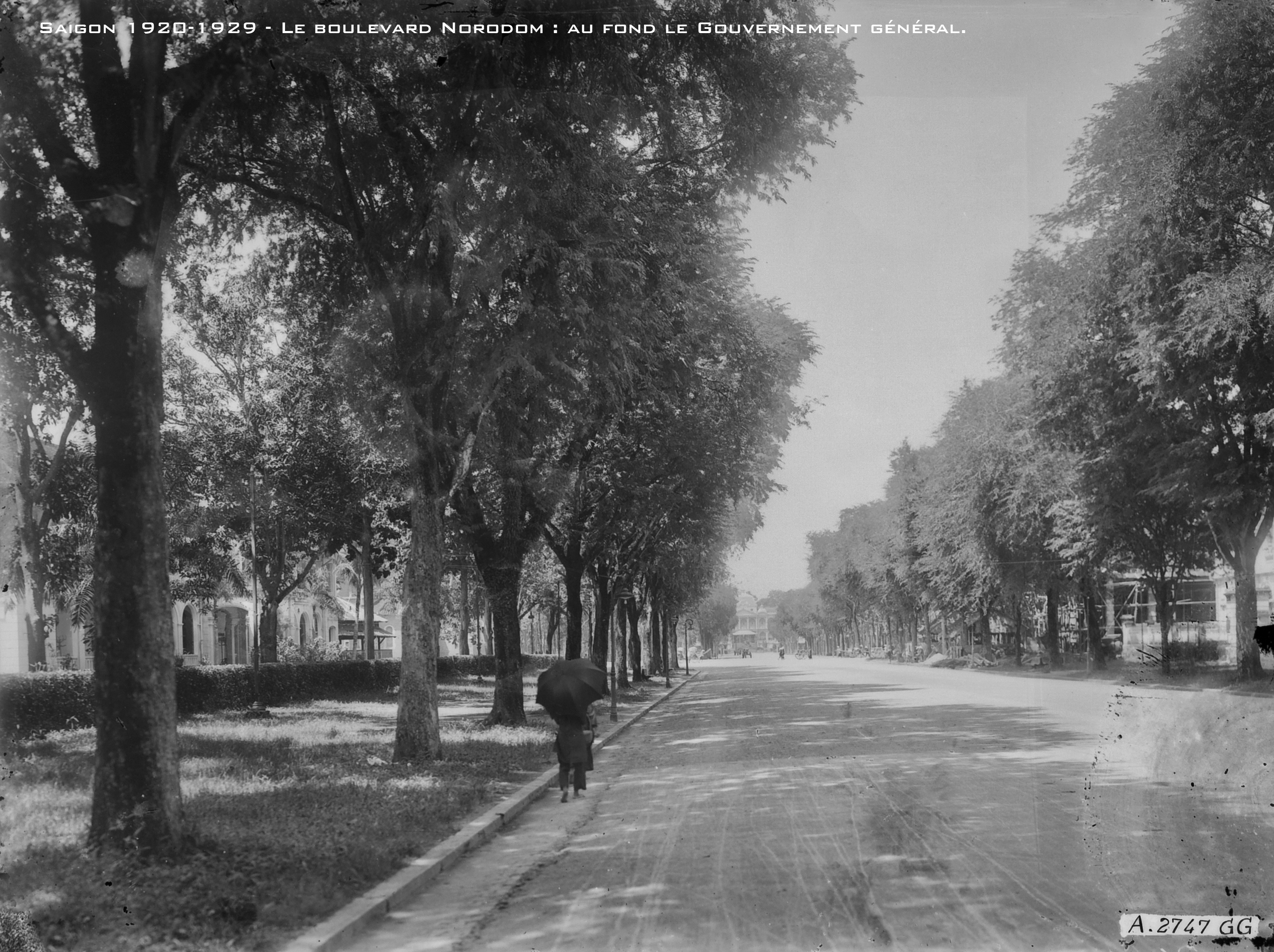
The boulevard Norodom in the 1920s

Lê Duẩn Boulevard, initially named boulevard Norodom, named after King Norodom of Cambodia, is one of Saigon's first five boulevards that were built by the French. According to scholar Vuong Hong Sen, the boulevard was opened in 1872, following the completion of the Saigon Governor's Palace.

Initially, the boulevard was quite short, stretching only from the palace to rue Catinat. It was then extended in two stages: first as far as rue de Bangkok (present-day Mạc Đĩnh Chi Street) and then all the way to the Botanical and Zoological Gardens.

In 1955, following the departure of the French, boulevard Norodom was renamed Thống Nhứt Boulevard (lit. 'Reunification Boulevard') by the South Vietnamese government of Ngô Đình Diệm.

In August 1975, after the Fall of Saigon, the boulevard was renamed April 30 Boulevard by the Provisional Revolutionary Government. In 1986, it was renamed again to Lê Duẩn Boulevard to commemorate Vietnam Communist Party General Secretary Lê Duẩn, who died earlier that year.

== "Business Boulevard" ==
The boulevard is also known as "The Business Boulevard" for being a prestigious diplomatic area where mostly nations from the G7 with some other nations have set their general consulates here, and a central business district where located some major administrative agencies with many complex buildings for offices, hotels and malls. Independent houses and street vendors are unseen here.

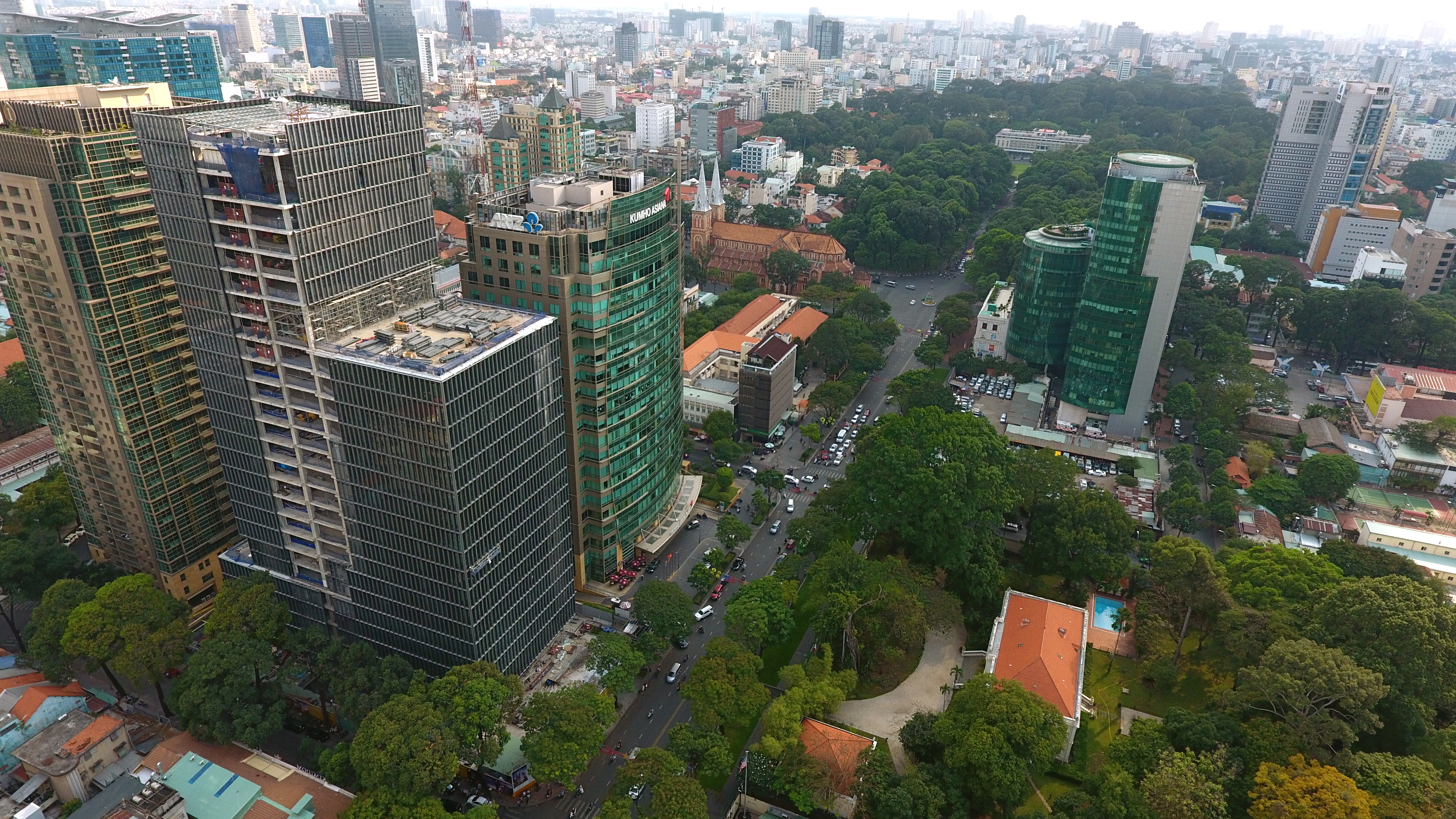
Intersection of Lê Duẩn Blvd – Hai Bà Trưng Street looked from above

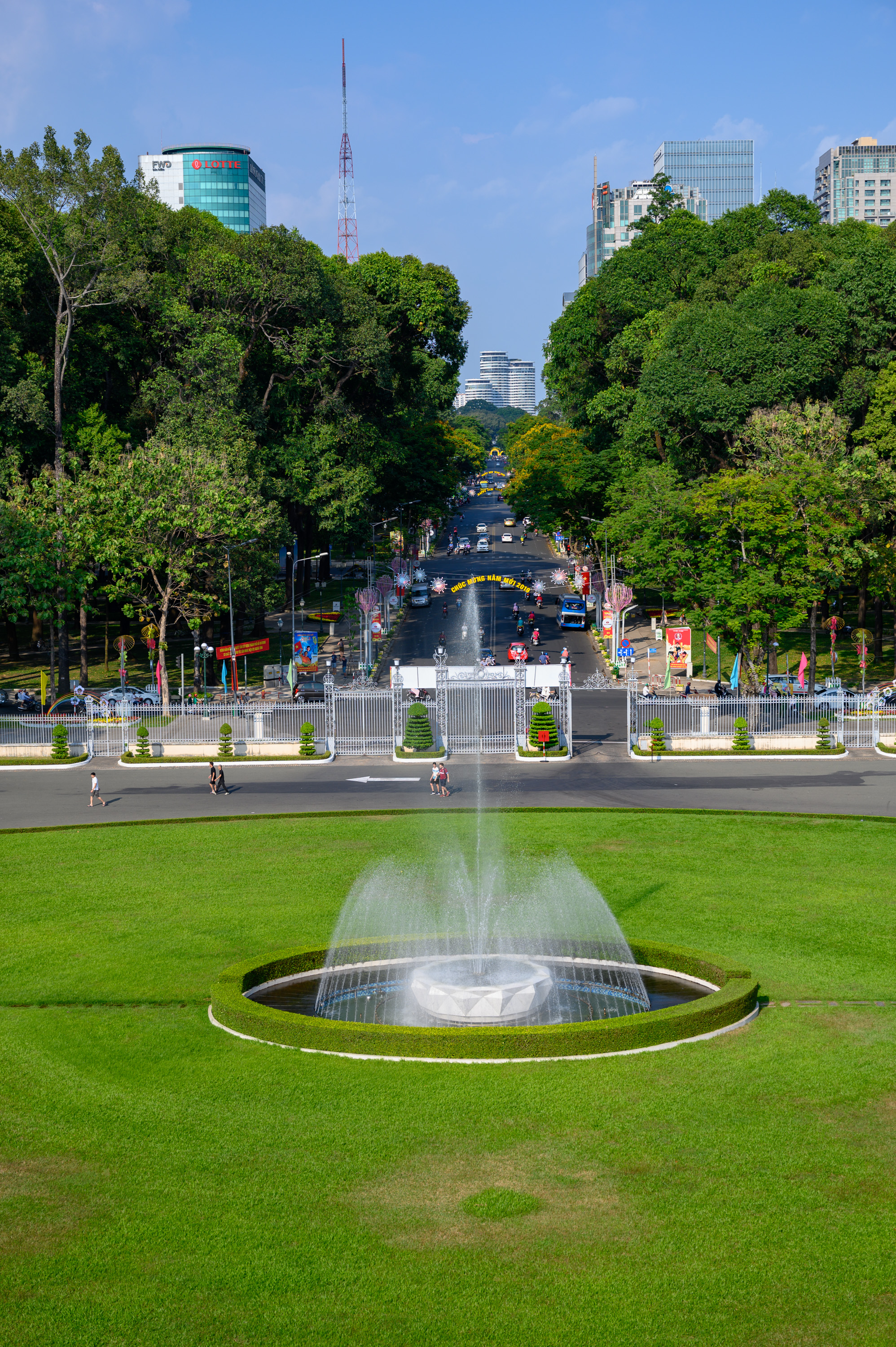
Buildings on Lê Duẩn Blvd looked from the balcony of the Independence Palace to the Saigon Zoo and Botanical Gardens

List of buildings on odd row
Address	Buildings name	Image	Primary tenants and notes
1–3–5 Lê Duẩn Boulevard	PetroVietnam Tower		Maserati, Petrovietnam, Tokyo Gas (Rep. Office), MBV (Modern Bank of Vietnam) of MB
7–11–13 Lê Duẩn Boulevard	Government Office in Ho Chi Minh City		
15 Lê Duẩn Boulevard	Petrolimex Saigon		Petrolimex
17A Lê Duẩn Boulevard	National Archives Center No.2		
17–19–21 Lê Duẩn Boulevard	Central Plaza Building	Khách_sạn_Sofitel_Sài_Gòn_24112013	Sofitel Saigon Plaza Hotel, United Overseas Bank
23 Lê Duẩn Boulevard	Techcombank Saigon / Masan Tower		Techcombank, Masan Group. It was the place of Lottery Company of Ho Chi Minh City before 2017, now it is moved to the Lottery Tower in District 5, Ho Chi Minh City
25 Lê Duẩn Boulevard	British Consulate General, Ho Chi Minh City		British Chambers of Commerce in Vietnam
27–29 Lê Duẩn Boulevard	Saigon Tower		J.P. Morgan & Co., OCBC Bank, PwC, Singapore Airlines, Thai Airways International, Tokyu Development of Tokyu Corporation,
31 Lê Duẩn Boulevard	Friendship Tower		ABB, Autodesk, Bank SinoPac, Netherlands Consulate General, Ho Chi Minh City
33 Lê Duẩn Boulevard	Deutsches Haus Ho Chi Minh City		Avison Young, CapitaLand, Germany Consulate General, Ho Chi Minh City
35–37–39 Lê Duẩn Boulevard	mPlaza Saigon Complex	HCMC_panorama_view_(14424529008)_(cropped)	JW Marriott Hotels & Suites Saigon, Shinhan Bank, Siam Commercial Bank, Woori Bank, Kookmin Bank, CTBC Bank, Shell plc, Starlux Airlines, The Coffee Bean & Tea Leaf, GS25
41–43 Lê Duẩn Boulevard	T41 Station – Government Cipher Committee Office		
45–47 Lê Duẩn Boulevard	People’s Council – People’s Committee of District 1 (now the ward of Saigon)		

List of buildings on even row
Address	Buildings name	Image	Primary tenants and notes
2 Lê Duẩn Boulevard	Museum of Ho Chi Minh Strategy	Museum_of_Ho_Chi_Minh_Campaign	Ocean Palace Chinese Restaurant, Hoàng Long Convention and Wedding Center
10–12 Đinh Tiên Hoàng Street (Cross with Lê Duẩn)	Ho Chi Minh City University of Social Sciences and Humanities - Main Campus		Block K in the campus was part of the Cộng Hòa Barracks
2A Lê Duẩn Boulevard	School of Pharmacy, Ho Chi Minh City Medicine and Pharmacy University		It was part of the Cộng Hòa Barracks and was rent by The Coffee House then Bụi Central Coffee
2Ter Lê Duẩn Boulevard	National Archives Center No.2		
2B Lê Duẩn Boulevard	No name		Currently rent by Highlands Coffee and Yen Sushi & SakePub
4 Lê Duẩn Boulevard	General Consulate of the United States, Ho Chi Minh City	Site_of_the_former_US_Embassy_Saigon	
6 Lê Duẩn Boulevard	General Consulate of France, Ho Chi Minh City		
8–10–12 Lê Duẩn Boulevard	Lavenue Crown		On hold. Currently an empty lot and temporarily used for parking.
34 Lê Duẩn Boulevard	Diamond Plaza	Diamond_Plaza,_Ho_Chi_Minh_City	Lotte Subsidiaries, Lotte Department Store, CJ CGV, Korean Air, Nonghyup Bank, Industrial Bank of Korea, KOTRA, Samsonite, FWD Group, The American Center Ho Chi Minh City Library
