= Cathay Bank =

Chinese American bank

Cathay General Bancorp

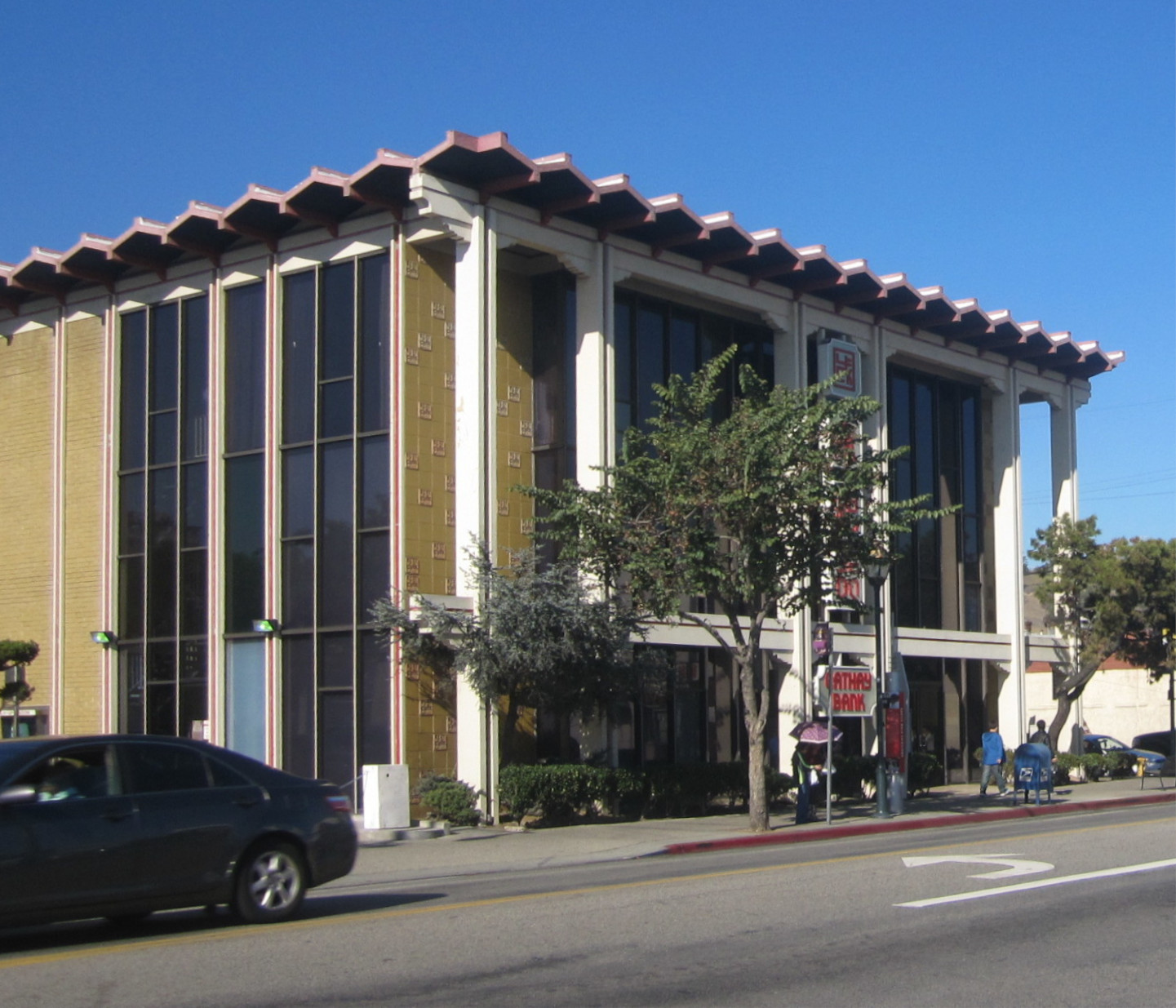
- Cathay Bank headquarters, 777 N Broadway in Chinatown, Los Angeles
- Native name: 國泰銀行
- Type: Public
- Traded as: Nasdaq: CATY; S&P 600 Component
- ISIN: US1491501045
- Industry: Finance and Insurance
- Founded: April 19, 1962; 64 years ago in Los Angeles, California, US
- Headquarters: Los Angeles, California, US
- Key people: Dunson K. Cheng; (executive chairman); Chang Liu; (president & CEO); Heng W. Chen; (EVP & CFO)
- Products: Banking
- Revenue: ▲US$ 537.40 million (2020)
- Operating income: ▲US$ 228.90 million (2020)
- Net income: ▲US$ 228.90 million (2020)
- Total assets: ▲US$ 19 billion (2020)
- Total equity: ▲US$ 2.42 billion (2020)
- Number of employees: 1,100 (2020)
- Website: cathaybank.com

Cathay Bank (traditional Chinese: 國泰銀行; simplified Chinese: 国泰银行; pinyin: Guótài Yínháng; Cantonese Yale: Gwoktaai Ngàhnhòhng) is a Chinese American bank founded in 1962.

Cathay is headquartered in Chinatown, Los Angeles, with a corporate center in nearby El Monte, California. It has branches in California, Massachusetts, New York, Texas, Washington, Illinois, New Jersey, Nevada, Maryland, and Hong Kong. It also has representative offices in Shanghai, Beijing and Taipei.

== History ==
Fung Chow Chan (Mar 1, 1909–Jan 29, 2001), emigrated from Guangdong to Los Angeles in 1933 to join his father's silk business and founded the Phoenix Bakery in Chinatown with his wife Wai Hing in 1938; the success of the bakery's strawberry cream cake, developed by his brother Lun, allowed him to be one of the first Asian Americans to integrate the Silver Lake neighborhood. However, he was denied a home loan because he was an immigrant, which spurred him to organize local community leaders and apply for a bank charter. Initial attempts to open a savings and loan were denied repeatedly by state regulators, so the group of investors he led instead applied for a commercial bank charter, receiving it on May 5, 1961 and Cathay Bank started operations in 1962, the first bank owned and operated primarily by Chinese-Americans to serve their community in Southern California. Chan's fellow founders were George T.M. Ching, Gerald T. Deal, Dr. Tin Y. Kwong, John R. MacFaden, Thomas Quon, and John F. Varela. Chan also helped found East West Bank in 1973, which received its charter on June 20, 1972.

Chan hired Eugene Kinn Choy, an architect responsible for many prominent buildings in Chinatown, to design the new bank's headquarters, which opened in 1966 at 777 N Broadway. The International Modern building incorporates the cultural heritage of its founders in the shape of the roof and the four Chinese characters running down the facade. In 1979 it opened its first branch office in Monterey Park. Its first overseas representative office in Hong Kong was opened in 1985.

In 1999, Cathay expanded beyond California by opening a loan production office in Houston, Texas, which was converted to a full-service branch in 2000. Expansion to New York occurred in 1999 with the acquisition of certain assets of Golden City Commercial Bank. The Cathay Bank Foundation was established in 2002 to create opportunities for affordable housing, community and economic development, and education.

In 2003, branch offices were opened in Boston, Massachusetts, and Kent, Washington. Cathay merged with General Bank in 2003. In 2006, Cathay prevailed in a bidding war with United Commercial Bank to acquire Great Eastern Bank. Cathay also acquired New Asia Bank in 2006.

On March 31, 2006, Cathay announced plans to acquire a 20% stake in the First Bank, but the deal fell through because the companies failed to get approval from the Chinese government. On March 30, 2007, Cathay expanded into New Jersey when it completed its acquisition of United Heritage Bank.

In 2007, Cathay Bank converted its Hong Kong representative office into a full-service branch.

On January 21, 2015, Cathay General Bancorp, the holding company for Cathay Bank, and Asia Bancshares, the holding company for Asia Bank, N.A., announced that they had entered into a definitive agreement for the merger of Asia Bancshares into Cathay. The result of the merger increased Cathay Bank's presence in New York as well as added Maryland to its list of service areas.

On July 8, 2016, Cathay announced plans to acquire Far East National Bank.

On May 26, 2021, Cathay entered into an agreement with HSBC Bank USA, N.A. to purchase HSBC's retail operations on the West Coast, including 10 branches in Washington and California. Under the agreement, Cathay will acquire approximately $1.0 billion in deposits and approximately $800 million in loans. The two branches based in Seattle were once part of the former Marine Midland Bank, which HSBC acquired full ownership in 1987.

== Acquisitions ==
- First Public Savings Bank (1996)
- Lippo Bank's Westminster branch (1997)
- Certain assets of Golden City Commercial Bank in New York (1999)
- General Bank (2003)
- Great Eastern Bank (2006)
- New Asia Bank (2006)
- United Heritage Bank (2007)
- Asia Bank, N.A. (2015)
- Far East National Bank (2017)

== See also ==
- List of S&P 400 companies
