= American Continental Bank =

- Type: Private
- Industry: Finance and Insurance
- Founded: October 6, 2003
- Headquarters: City of Industry, California
- Key people: Mr. Terry Lou, CEO
- Products: Banking
- Total assets: $ 328.579 million (March 31, 2021)
- Website: www.americancontinentalbank.com

American Continental Bank (Chinese: 美國大陸銀行) is an overseas Chinese bank in the United States. Headquartered in Industry, California, with a branch office in San Gabriel, California, the bank is privately held and was established on October 6, 2003.

The bank was first created by a group of local businessmen and individuals who were interested in providing specialized financial services to the Chinese community. The City of Industry, California is an area with higher concentration of factories, and the local Chinese population is greatly involved in production. As a result, the bank provides financial services to small and mid-sized businesses like other overseas Chinese banks in the United States, but the bank originally focused on those in the manufacturing industry.

In October 2022, the Taiwan-based Taichung Bank announced plans to acquire the American Continental Bank.
