= Tomato Bank =

- Type: Private
- Industry: Finance and Insurance
- Founded: Alhambra, California, (2000)
- Defunct: 2016
- Successor: Royal Business Bank
- Headquarters: Alhambra, California
- Key people: David Pontifes (SVP Senior Deputy Administrator); Li Chen Herman (President) Chris Chan (CFO) Ellen Guerrero (HR)
- Products: Banking

Tomato Bank (Chinese: 宏基銀行), more commonly styled as TomatoBank, was an overseas Chinese bank in the United States. Headquartered in Alhambra, California, with branch offices in Cerritos, California, Diamond Bar, California, Industry, California, and West Los Angeles, Los Angeles, California, this privately held community bank was first established on September 29, 2000. It was merged into Royal Business Bank in 2016 and branches were renamed to Royal Business Bank. The bank was acquired by Royal Business Bank in February 2016. It is not related to the Japanese Tomato Bank.
