= EverTrust Bank =

Chinese American bank

- Company type: Private
- Industry: Financial services
- Founded: May 3, 1995; 31 years ago
- Headquarters: City of Industry, California
- Key people: Mr. Jesse Kung (chairman); Mr. Charles Hsieh (CEO)
- Total assets: US$839 million (December 2022)
- Owner: O-Bank
- Website: evertrustbank.com

EverTrust Bank (Chinese: 華信商業銀行; pinyin: Huáxìn Shāngyè Yínháng) is an overseas Chinese bank in the United States. Headquartered in City of Industry, California with branch offices in Los Angeles and Orange County, it is privately held and was established on May 3, 1995. O-Bank, a commercial bank based in Taipei, acquired EverTrust Bank in April 2007.

In comparison to other overseas Chinese banks in the United States established earlier, EverTrust originally served newly arrived immigrants at its inception. As a local community bank, the expansion of EverTrust Bank mirrored the diffusion of Chinese immigrants in Orange County, California, and its new client base in upscale neighborhoods is generally wealthier than other immigrants.
