= King's Town Bank =

Taiwanese commercial bank

King's Town Bank 京城銀行
- Traded as: TWSE: 2809
- Industry: Banking
- Founded: 1 November 1948; 77 years ago
- Headquarters: Tainan City, Taiwan
- Key people: Jih-Cheng, Chang (president)
- Products: Financial services
- Total assets: NT$10,512,000,000
- Owner: SinoPac Financial Holding Co.
- Number of employees: 1000, according to 2021 database
- Website: customer.ktb.com.tw/new/

King's Town Bank (Chinese: 京城銀行; pinyin: Jīngchéng Yínháng; Wade–Giles: Ching^{1}-ch'êng^{2} Yin^{2}-hang^{2}) previously known as the Tainan Small and Medium Business Bank (Chinese: 臺南區中小企業銀行; Wade–Giles: T'ai^{2}-nan^{2}-ch'ü^{1} Chung^{1}-hsiao^{3}ch'i^{4}-yeh^{4} Yin^{2}-hang^{2}), is a Taiwanese commercial bank established on November 1, 1948.

In 2006, it was renamed “King's Town Bank” to symbolize a new service spirit. It is headquartered in West Central District, Tainan, Taiwan. As of 2020, the bank had 65 branches in Taiwan.

in October 2025, it was announced that SinoPac Financial Holding Co. had acquired the bank, intending to merge its operations with its Bank SinoPac.

== See also ==
- List of banks in Taiwan
