= Asia Bank =

Asia Bank, N.A. (Asia Bank, National Association) was an Overseas Chinese bank with offices in the Northeastern United States founded in 1984.

On January 21, 2015, Asia Bancshares, the holding company for Asia Bank, entered into a definitive agreement with Cathay General Bancorp, the holding company for Cathay Bank, for the merger of Asia Bancshares into Cathay. All retail banking locations of Asia Bank have been converted to Cathay Bank since then.

Its offices are located as follows:

- Main Branch on Roosevelt Avenue in Flushing, Queens, New York
- Loan Center on Roosevelt Avenue in Flushing, Queens, New York
- Elmhurst Branch on Broadway in Elmhurst, Queens, New York
- Chinatown Branch in Chatham Square in New York, New York
- Rockville Branch on Hungerford Drive in Rockville, Maryland

Like other banks of its type, Asia Bank, N.A. caters primarily to overseas Chinese. Patrons are able to conduct business in Chinese if they prefer or have a necessity to do so. Likewise, patrons can expect employees to be familiar with norms of etiquette in Asia.
