= Vương Văn Đông =

South Vietnamese military officer (1930–2018)

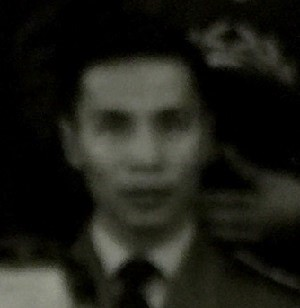
Đông in the 1950s

Lieutenant Colonel Vương Văn Đông (March 5, 1930 – April 21, 2018) was an officer of the Army of the Republic of Vietnam who led the failed coup attempt of 1960 against President Ngô Đình Diệm. After the failed coup, he fled to Cambodia with the other coup leaders aboard a commandeered air force C-47. Đông was allowed to quietly settle in France.
