= Bank SinoPac =

Taiwan-based banking holding company

Bank SinoPac 永豐商業銀行
- Company type: Corporation
- Industry: Banking
- Founded: 1992; 34 years ago
- Headquarters: Taiwan
- Products: Financial services
- Total assets: US$120 billion
- Total equity: NT$110.600530450 billion
- Website: Official website

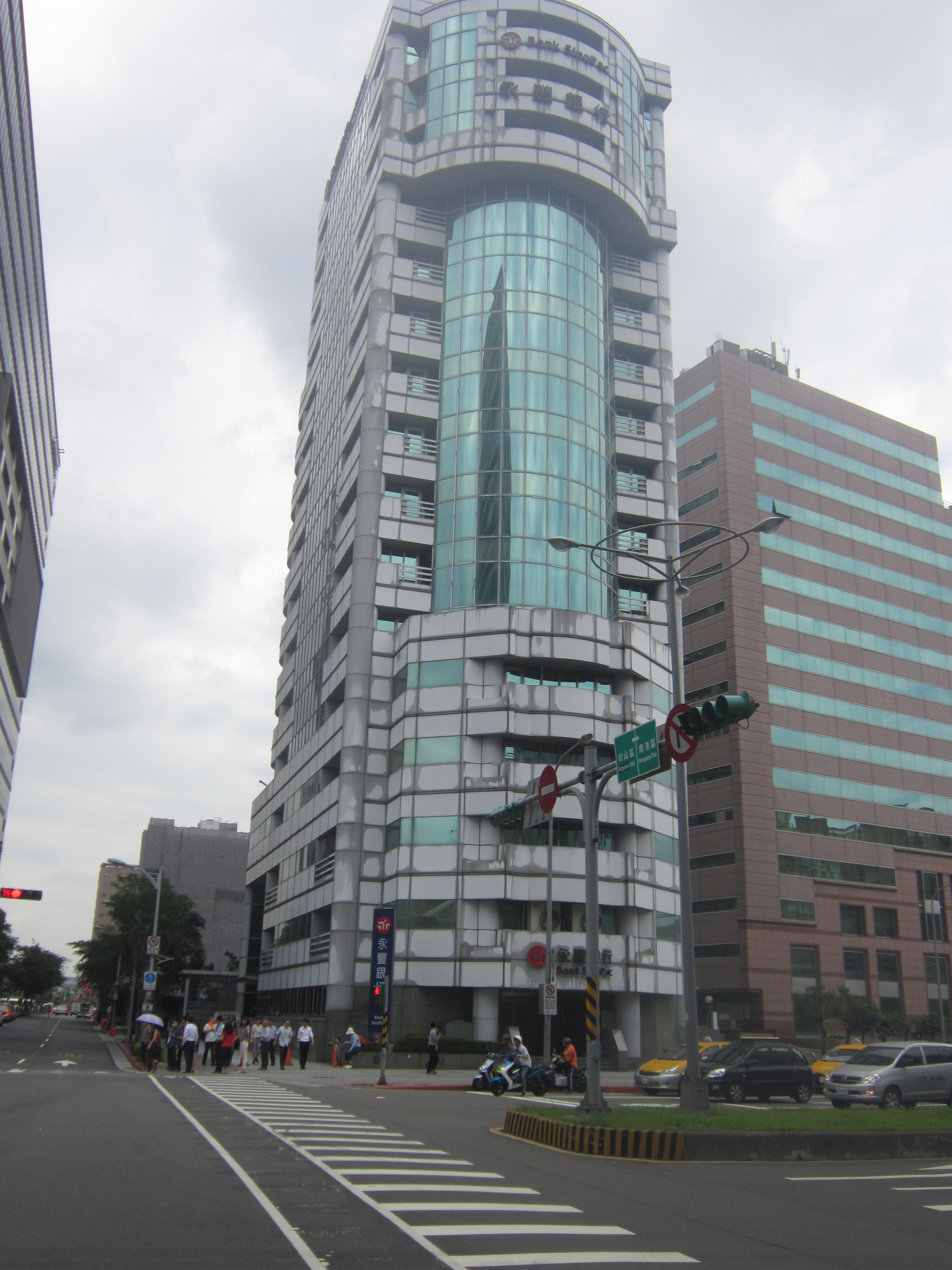
Songshan Operation Building, Bank SinoPac

The SinoPac Financial Holdings Company Ltd (Bank SinoPac; TWSE: 2890, Chinese: 永豐金融控股公司; pinyin: Yǒngfēng Jīnróng Kònggǔ Gōngsī), is a Taiwan-based banking holding company which operates through 22 divisions as well as 125 branches in Taiwan and overseas branches.

== History ==
The bank was founded by Samuel Yin and Paul Lo in 1992 as Taiwan liberalized its banking regulations. As Taiwan continued to liberalize its financial market, SinoPac acquired a securities business from the Hong family of local fame in early 2000s. In late 2005, SinoPac merged with the International Bank of Taipei(IBT). SinoPac, like many other Taiwanese financial institutions, has branches and operations in the United States and major Asian cities; however, SinoPac is unique in its foresight in building on-the-ground business in the US and China. Far East National Bank, a wholly owned California chartered bank was acquired in 1997; SinoFirst, located in Shanghai, China, was acquired in late 1990s.

In 2017, Taiwan's banking regulator, the Financial Supervisory Commission, ordered SinoPac chairman Ho Shou-chuan to step down following revelations he extended generous loans to "an offshore company with no real operations with high investment by the Yuen Foong Yu Group" which was controlled by SinoPac's founding Ho family. Ho Shou-chuan has not faced legal repercussions.

Bank SinoPac announced a merger with King's Town Bank on March 27, 2026, pending regulatory approval.

== See also ==
- List of banks in Taiwan
- Economy of Taiwan
- List of companies of Taiwan
