= United International Bank =

- Company type: Private
- Industry: Finance and Insurance
- Founded: New York City, New York, U.S. (2006)
- Defunct: 2015
- Fate: Acquired by Preferred Bank
- Headquarters: New York City, New York, U.S.
- Key people: Mr. Fred T. Hung (CEO)
- Products: Banking
- Website: UIBBank.com

United International Bank (Chinese: 國際銀行) was an overseas Chinese bank in the United States, formerly headquartered in New York City.

The bank established itself as a locally based community bank serving Chinese Americans and Asian Americans in the New York City area. Most of its clients were newly arrived immigrants and local small business owners who faced difficulties in obtaining financial support from other mainstream banks. In addition to serving the needs of small business owners and entrepreneurs, the bank specialized in financing credit arrangements for import and export trades.

Unlike most overseas Chinese banks in the United States whose managements consist mainly of Chinese people, the managerial team of United International Bank included a significant number of non-Asians. These included many experienced former executives of mainstream banks invited to help lead the bank to prosperity. The advisory committee and board of directors of the bank included a number of celebrities such as the famed Dr. Henry C. Lee, and other community activists and leaders.

The bank was one of the first in providing both traditional and simplified Chinese characters on its ATMs and internet banking website.

In 2015, Preferred Bank acquired UIB for $22.2 million.
