= Pacific Global Bank =

- Company type: Subsidiary (since September 2019)
- Industry: Financial services
- Founded: Chicago (November 9, 1995)
- Fate: Acquired
- Headquarters: Chicago
- Key people: Betty Chow
- Products: Banking
- Owner: Royal Business Bank
- Website: www.pacificglobalbank.com

Pacific Global Bank (Chinese: 高寶銀行) was a chinese American commercial bank in the United States. It was headquartered in Chicago, with 3 branches in Chinatown, Chicago and Bridgeport, Chicago, the community bank was acquired in September 2019 by Royal Business Bank.

Although the bank generally provides the similar kind of services catering to the local Chinese community, its clients include greater portions of scientists and engineers than other overseas Chinese banks, which cater more to small business owners and import–export merchants. This reflects the general occupational trend of Chinese Americans in the Chicago region, and had helped the bank expand rapidly.

== History ==
The bank was established on the 9 November 1995 in Chicago.

In September 2019, Pacific Global Bank was acquired by Royal Business Bank for $32.5 million.
