= Cộng Hòa Barracks =

Barracks of the Presidential Guard of South Vietnam

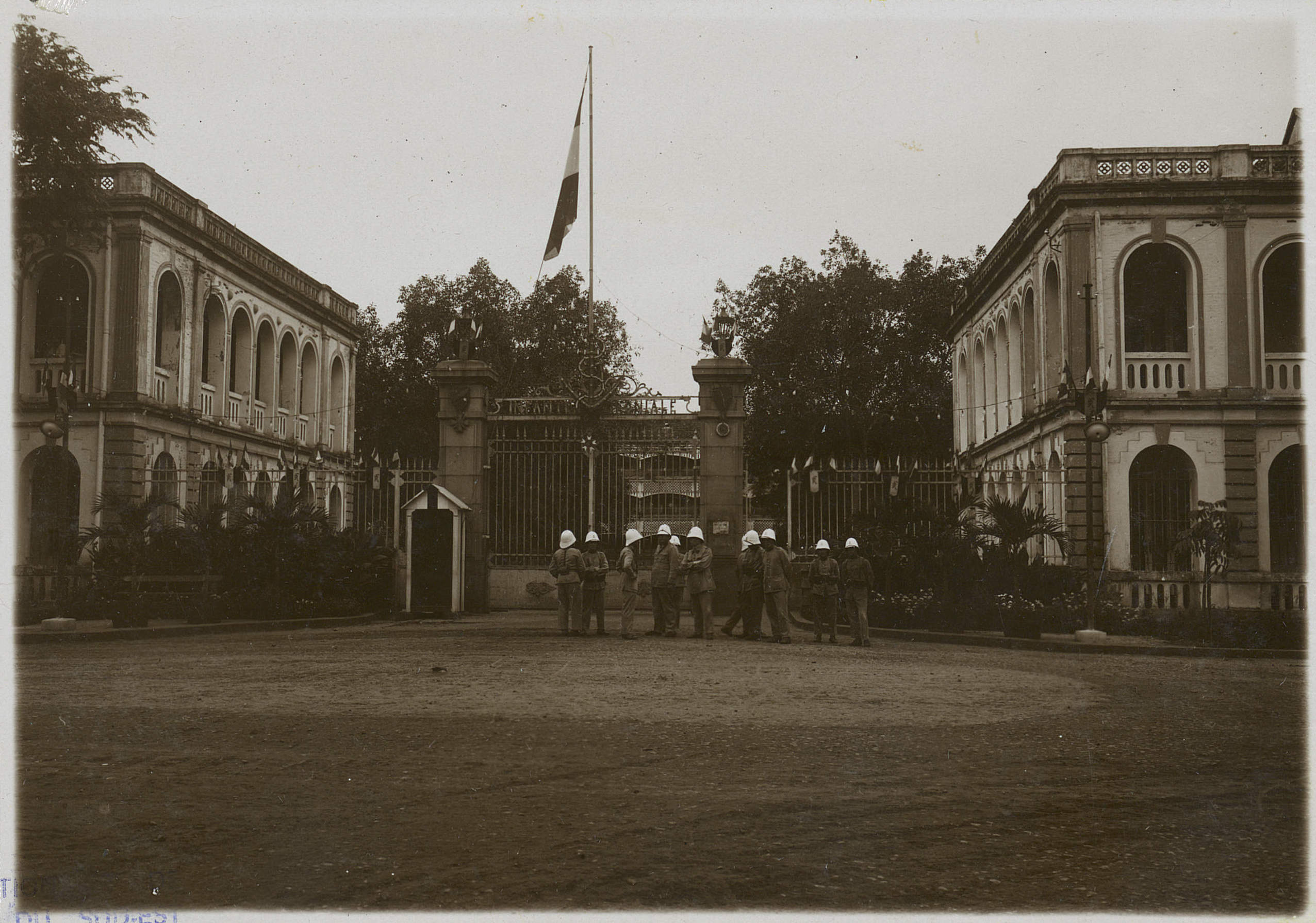
The Caserne de l'Infanterie in 1928-30

The Cộng Hòa Barracks ("Republic barracks", Vietnamese: Thành Cộng Hòa) were the barracks of the Presidential Guard of South Vietnam. It was located in the centre of Saigon, near the Gia Long Palace and the Independence Palace.

The barracks were originally built by the French in the 1870-3 as the Caserne de l'Infanterie on the site of the former Phoenix Citadel (Thành Phượng) built by the Nguyễn dynasty Emperor Minh Mang. Following the Japanese coup d'état in French Indochina in March 1945 the Caserne was used to imprison French soldiers and officials. In 1956 President Ngo Dinh Diem renamed the Caserne as the Cộng Hòa barracks and used them as the headquarters and barracks of the Presidential Guard.

During the 1963 South Vietnamese coup rebel forces from the ARVN 5th Division commanded by Colonel Nguyễn Văn Thiệu attacked both the barracks and the Gia Long Palace. At the barracks 5th Division armored and artillery units faced off with the Guard forces armed with tanks, artillery, mortars and machine guns. Rebel artillery soon reduced the barracks to rubble while Guards forces fired back causing damage to the surrounding area.

The barracks were largely destroyed in the 1963 coup and now the only part of the barracks that remains are the two gatehouses at 2a Le Duan Boulevard on opposite sides of Dinh Tien Hoang (10.7852°N 106.702°E and 10.7855°N 106.703°E).
