= Royal Business Bank =

American bank based in California

RBB Bancorp
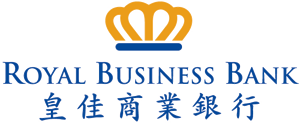
- Company type: Public
- Traded as: Nasdaq: RBB; Russell 2000 Component
- Industry: Banking
- Founded: 2008; 18 years ago
- Founder: Louis C. Chang
- Headquarters: Los Angeles, California
- Key people: Louis C. Chang (emeritus chairman); Yee Phong Thian (president and CEO)
- Revenue: $87.3 million (2017)
- Total assets: $3.7 billion (March 31, 2021)
- Website: royalbusinessbankusa.com

Royal Business Bank (Chinese: 皇佳商業銀行) is a Chinese American bank based in Los Angeles, California. It is one of the biggest Chinese American banks in the country, and has branches in California, Nevada, Hawaii, New Jersey, Illinois, and New York. It is a wholly owned subsidiary of RBB Bancorp.

== History ==
The Bank was founded by Louis Chang in November 2008 in Los Angeles, California. It started out with one location but since 2011, and has since has opened three new locations in San Gabriel, Torrance, and Rowland Heights. RBB has acquired First Asian Bank (Las Vegas) in 2011, Ventura County Business Bank, Oxnard, Los Angeles National Bank, Buena Park, and TomatoBank (Alhambra) for $83.2 million in 2015, spreading its coverage all over California and Las Vegas. In July 2017, RBB entered the Nasdaq and raised $86 million.

In September 2019, RBB acquired Pacific Global Bank in Chicago for $32.5 million. In May 2021, RBB raised $120 million to pursue its acquisitions spree and James Kao was elected new chairman of the board.

== Overview ==
The company offers various financial services but primarily offers its products and services to individuals, small and middle-market businesses, municipalities, and other entities in the Chinese-American community. They have also branched out to include new customers that are not part of the Chinese-American community.
