= Preferred Bank =

Chinese-America Bank Located in South California

- Company type: Public
- Traded as: Nasdaq: PFBC; S&P 600 component
- Industry: Financial services
- Founded: 1991; 35 years ago
- Headquarters: Los Angeles County, California, United States
- Key people: Li Yu, Chairman, Chairman and CEO; Wellington Chen, President and COO; Edward J. Czajka, EVP and CFO; Nick Pi, EVP and CCO; Johnny Hsu, EVP and Deputy COO
- Products: Banking
- Total assets: US$6.422 billion (2022)
- Number of employees: 120 (2022)
- Website: preferredbank.com

Preferred Bank (Chinese: 保富銀行) is a California state-chartered bank founded in 1991 to serve the Chinese American community in Southern California. The bank expanded in 2015 through acquisition after facing inadequate leverage ratios and concerns about management from its regulator in 2010.

In 2023, Preferred Bank was ranked #10 on Bank Director's Top 25 U.S. Banks list.

== History ==
The bank was founded in 1991. In its early years the bank focused its services on the Chinese American community in Southern California.

Preferred Bank first announced an initial public offering in 1998, but postponed the offering due to poor market conditions. Its eventual IPO in 2005 raised over US$80 million in a sale of over 2 million shares. Preferred Bank is listed on NASDAQ (Nasdaq: PFBC).

An inadequate leverage ratio and concerns about management led to a consent decree in March 2010, later lifted and replaced with a memorandum of understanding, in which California banking regulators required the bank to review its management policies and increase its liquidity. In 2015, Preferred Bank acquired United International Bank of Flushing, New York. The loan obligations taken on as part of the acquisition increased its percentage of problem assets significantly, and after losing money on the disposal of problem assets, the company returned to a focus on local business rather than acquisitions.
