= United Commercial Bank =

- Type: Public
- Industry: Finance and Insurance
- Founded: 1974; 52 years ago San Francisco, California
- Defunct: November 6, 2009
- Fate: The California Department of Financial Institutions declared this bank insolvent and put it into FDIC receivership.
- Successor: East West Bank
- Headquarters: San Francisco, California, U.S.
- Products: Banking
- Revenue: $583.3 million USD (▲$100.9M FY 2006)
- Number of employees: 1,318
- Website: http://www.ibankunited.com/home.html

United Commercial Bank (Chinese: 聯合銀行) was an overseas Chinese bank in the United States, based in San Francisco, California. It was a subsidiary of UCBH Holdings. Founded in 1974 as United Federal Savings and Loan Association, it changed its name to United Savings Bank, and finally United Commercial Bank in 1998. It had operations and branches located in the San Francisco Bay Area, Sacramento, Stockton, Los Angeles and Orange counties, New York, Boston, Greater Seattle Area, Hong Kong, Atlanta, Houston, Shanghai and two representative branches in Taipei, Taiwan and Shenzhen, China. United Commercial Bank was closed by regulators on November 6, 2009; it was the 120th U.S. bank to fail in 2009, and it had $11.2 billion in assets at the time of the bank failure. East West Bank of Pasadena, California, acquired all the deposits of UCBH.

== Corporate history ==
On January 11, 2007, UCBH announced that it was acquiring The Chinese American Bank with branch locations in Manhattan, New York and Flushing, New York. The deal was expected to close in the second quarter of 2007. On March 27, 2007, it was announced that UCBH would acquire Business Development Bank of Shanghai. The purchase was a $205 million cash purchase. The BDB acquisition gave UCB "a banking license in China -- a 'rare and hard-to-come-by' asset that makes it easier to operate and expand in that country, said RBC Capital Markets analyst Joe Morford. It has full-service offices in Shanghai, Hong Kong and Shantou, China."

The California Department of Financial Institutions closed United Commercial Bank on November 6, 2009, and appointed the Federal Deposit Insurance Corporation as the bank's receiver. The bank's operations were merged into East West Bank. The bank, which took on $299 million preferred stock Troubled Asset Relief Program (TARP) funding from the United States Treasury in 2008—which is now a loss to the Treasury—is also expected to cost the FDIC some $1.4 billion in losses, the bulk of the losses on about $7.7 billion of UCB's assets acquired by East West.

UCB before the FDIC intervention also "was tainted by a financial scandal that resulted in a shake-up of its top management. [It] announced in September [2009] that its financial reports could not be trusted because of the 'deliberate and improper actions and omissions of certain bank officers,' who had understated losses in 'an apparent desire to downplay deteriorating financial conditions.' The company's longtime chief executive, Thomas S. Wu, resigned in September, [as did] its chief operating officer."

UCBH, "East West and Cathay General Bancorp of Los Angeles ... vied for years to become the largest of the banks focused on the Chinese American market. East West, which had $12.5 billion in assets at last report, agreed to acquire $10.2 billion of United Commercial's $11.2 billion in assets. That would put the combined bank, at almost $23 billion in assets, ahead of L.A.-based City National as the largest bank based in Southern California. At last report, City National had $18.4 billion in assets." The combined UCBH/East West would also far outrank Cathay, which had total assets of $11.39 billion in 2009. The stock market and East West (at least initially and through Nov. 11) has seen the acquisition of UCBH as "highly accretive," and shares of East West (EWBC.O) jumped as much as 57% to touch a high of $13.57 on the first day of trading after the acquisition. Minsheng Banking Corp, a private Chinese bank, applied to the Federal Reserve Board to acquire UCB in the weeks before the FDIC and EWB actions, but the Fed either turned it down or failed to expedite what can be a several-month approval process. Minsheng's bid could have saved the U. S. government $1.7 billion, between the nearly $300 million TARP funds and the $1.4 billion FDIC losses.

== UCBH acquisitions ==
- Golden Coin Savings & Loan Association (1992)
- Asian American Bank & Trust Company (2005)
- Summit National Bank (2006)
- The Chinese American Bank (2007)
- Business Development Bank Ltd. (2007)

== See also ==
- Bank failure
- List of largest U.S. bank failures
- Federal Deposit Insurance Corporation
- 2008 financial crisis
- 2008–2009 bank failures in the United States
- List of banks acquired or bankrupted in the United States during the 2008 financial crisis
