= Metro City Bank =

Korean-American bank in Georgia, USA

MetroCity Bankshares, Inc.
- Type: Public
- Traded as: Nasdaq: MCBS; Russell 2000 Index component
- Industry: Banking
- Founded: 2014; 12 years ago
- Headquarters: Doraville, Georgia, United States
- Key people: Nack Young Paek (chairman and CEO)
- Revenue: $92.9 million (2017)
- Website: metrocitybank.com

Metro City Bank (Korean: 메트로시티은행) is a Korean-American bank based in Doraville, Georgia and offers personal and commercial banking services. It is the largest Korean-American bank to not be based out of Los Angeles, California. It currently operates a total of 19 branches in Texas, New York, New Jersey, Virginia, Georgia, Alabama, and Florida.

== Overview ==
Although being relatively young, Metro City Bank has grown to be one of the biggest Korean-American banks in the country since its beginnings in 2014. The bank is state chartered and FDIC insured. It offers a financial products and services specifically for customers, which include small business owners, professionals, consumers and real estate developers. It offers personal and business banking, commercial real estate loans, commercial loans, automobile loans, personal loans, personal lines of credit, residential mortgages, Small Business Administration loans, and USDA B&I loans.
