= Universal Bank =

Private bank in California

- Company type: Private
- Industry: Finance
- Founded: West Covina, California, (1954)
- Headquarters: Los Angeles County, California
- Products: Banking
- Website: www.universalbank.com

Universal Bank headquartered in West Covina California, is a commercial bank with five branch locations in West Covina, Arcadia, Rosemead, Monterey Park and Eagle Rock, California. The Bank was first established on November 17, 1954, and is a wholly owned subsidiary of Universal Financial, Inc.

Universal Bank focuses on providing real estate financing in the local community.
