= East West Bancorp =

American financial services company

- Type: Public
- Traded as: Nasdaq: EWBC; S&P 400 Component
- Founded: August 26, 1998; 28 years ago
- Subsidiaries: East West Bank
- Website: www.eastwestbank.com

East West Bancorp is the parent company of East West Bank. It is a publicly owned company with over $70 billion in assets as of 2024. The company's wholly owned subsidiary, East West Bank, is the largest state-chartered bank in California as of 2023. East West earned the top spot in S&P Global Market Intelligence's 2022 Ranking of U.S. Public Banks by Financial Performance.

== Operations ==
As of 2024, East West Bank has more than 100 locations in the United States and Asia.

== History ==
East West Federal Bank (now East West Bank) was founded in 1973.

== Leadership ==
Dominic Ng is chairman and CEO of East West Bank.
