= East West Bank =

American bank

East West Bancorp, Inc.
- Company type: Subsidiary
- Industry: Banking; Financial services
- Founded: January 2, 1973; 53 years ago in Los Angeles, California
- Headquarters: Pasadena, California
- Number of locations: More than 100 locations (2025)
- Area served: California, New York, Texas, Washington, Nevada, Massachusetts, Georgia
- Key people: Dominic Ng (chairman and CEO); Christopher J. Del Moral-Niles, CFA (EVP and CFO); Irene H. Oh (EVP and CRO); Lisa Kim (General Counsel)
- Revenue: ▲US$2.619 billion (2024)
- Net income: ▲US$1.166 billion (2024)
- Total assets: ▲US$78.1 billion (2025)
- Total equity: ▲US$7.7 billion (2024)
- Number of employees: 3,000+ (2025)
- Parent: East West Bancorp
- Capital ratio: 14.28% (CET1; 2024)
- Rating: Fitch: BBB (long-term); A2/F2 (short-term)
- Website: www.eastwestbank.com

East West Bank is an American bank that is the primary subsidiary of East West Bancorp. It is the largest publicly traded bank headquartered in Southern California. The company has been ranked the #1 performing U.S. bank with more than $10 billion in assets by S&P Global Market Intelligence, and the top performing bank in its asset size (in excess of $50 billion) by Bank Director for three straight years since 2023.

East West was founded in 1973 in Los Angeles to serve the Chinese American community. As of 2025, the company is involved in commercial banking, residential lending, private equity, media, entertainment, infrastructure, healthcare, clean energy, technology, manufacturing, commercial real estate, and other sectors.

== History ==
In 1973, East West Federal Bank was founded as a federal savings and loan association, focused on serving the Chinese American community in Southern California.

In 1991, during the savings and loan crisis, the company acquired Pacific Coast Savings, which increased the bank's assets from $600 million to $1 billion and expanded operations to San Francisco, California.

In 1992, Dominic Ng was named CEO of the company. East West became a state-chartered commercial bank on July 31, 1995. In 1999, the company acquired First Central Bank for $13.5 million in cash.

In 2004, East West acquired Trust Bank, a Chinese American bank based in Monterey Park, California, with four branches and $235 million in assets, for $32.9 million. In 2005, the company acquired United National Bank, a commercial bank headquartered in San Marino, California, with 11 branches and $665 million in loans receivable, for $177.9 million. In 2006, the company acquired Standard Bank, a Chinese-American bank headquartered in Monterey Park, California, with 6 branches and $923 million in assets, for $200 million.

In 2007, the company acquired Desert Community Bank, a community bank operating in the Victor Valley region of California. Desert Community Bank branches remained branded as such and did not change to East West. In November 2017, East West agreed to sell Desert Community Bank to Flagstar Bank; the deal was completed in March 2018.

In 2009, East West acquired the assets of San Francisco-based United Commercial Bank (UCB), via a transaction facilitated by the Federal Deposit Insurance Corporation. This expanded East West’s reach by 63 branches, including 17 in Southern California, and branches in Houston, Boston, and Atlanta, as well as branches in Hong Kong and China.

In 2010, the company acquired the assets, including four branches, of Washington First International Bank of Seattle, Washington, via a transaction facilitated by the Federal Deposit Insurance Corporation. In 2014, East West acquired MetroCorp Bancshares, which operated as MetroBank, for $268 million in cash and stock.

In 2023, the company was named the top public bank in the United States with more than $10 billion in assets by S&P Global Market Intelligence. That same year, East West celebrated its 50th anniversary and became the largest state-chartered bank in California, surpassing $68 billion in assets.

In 2021, 2023, 2024, and 2025, East West earned recognition as the top performing bank in the $50 billion and above asset size category by Bank Director. As of June 2025, East West has more than $78 billion in assets and over 100 locations in the U.S. and Asia. In September 2024, the company marked its 25th anniversary on the Nasdaq stock exchange, with CEO Dominic Ng ringing the opening bell.

East West is also known for helping finance major films and television shows, including Everything Everywhere All at Once, Yellowstone, and Orange is the New Black.

== Philanthropy ==
=== 2025 wildfire relief ===
After the January 2025 Southern California wildfires, East West donated $250,000 to the Pasadena Community Foundation’s Eaton Fire Relief and Recovery Fund. The bank contributed an additional $100,000 to the YMCA of Metropolitan Los Angeles, while the bank’s employees created their own relief fund with the company matching contributions. East West’s donations to first responders and nonprofit organizations exceeded $1 million, as of August 2025. For customers, East West activated a “Skip-a-Pay” program, allowing affected homeowners to delay mortgage payments.

The bank also partnered with major museums, foundations, and philanthropists to help launch the “LA Arts Community Fire Relief Fund,” which raised an initial $12 million to support artists and arts workers impacted by the fires.

East West has participated in United Way’s WalkUnited LA. In July 2025, more than 500 East West-affiliated participants joined the walk, raising over $40,000. The bank pledged an additional $100,000 matching grant. East West’s other nonprofit partners include Gold House Foundation, Grameen America, Junior Achievement, Operation Hope, and San Gabriel Habitat for Humanity.

== Sponsorships ==
In 2005, East West signed figure skater Michelle Kwan to be a spokesperson and purchased the naming rights to East West Ice Palace, an ice rink arena in Artesia, California.

In 2023, the company signed professional golfer Rose Zhang to a sponsorship deal.

In 2024, the Los Angeles County Museum of Art (LACMA) announced a new multi-year partnership with East West, which supports exhibitions and educational programs at the museum. East West has also helped LACMA expand its collection.
