= First Colony Mall =

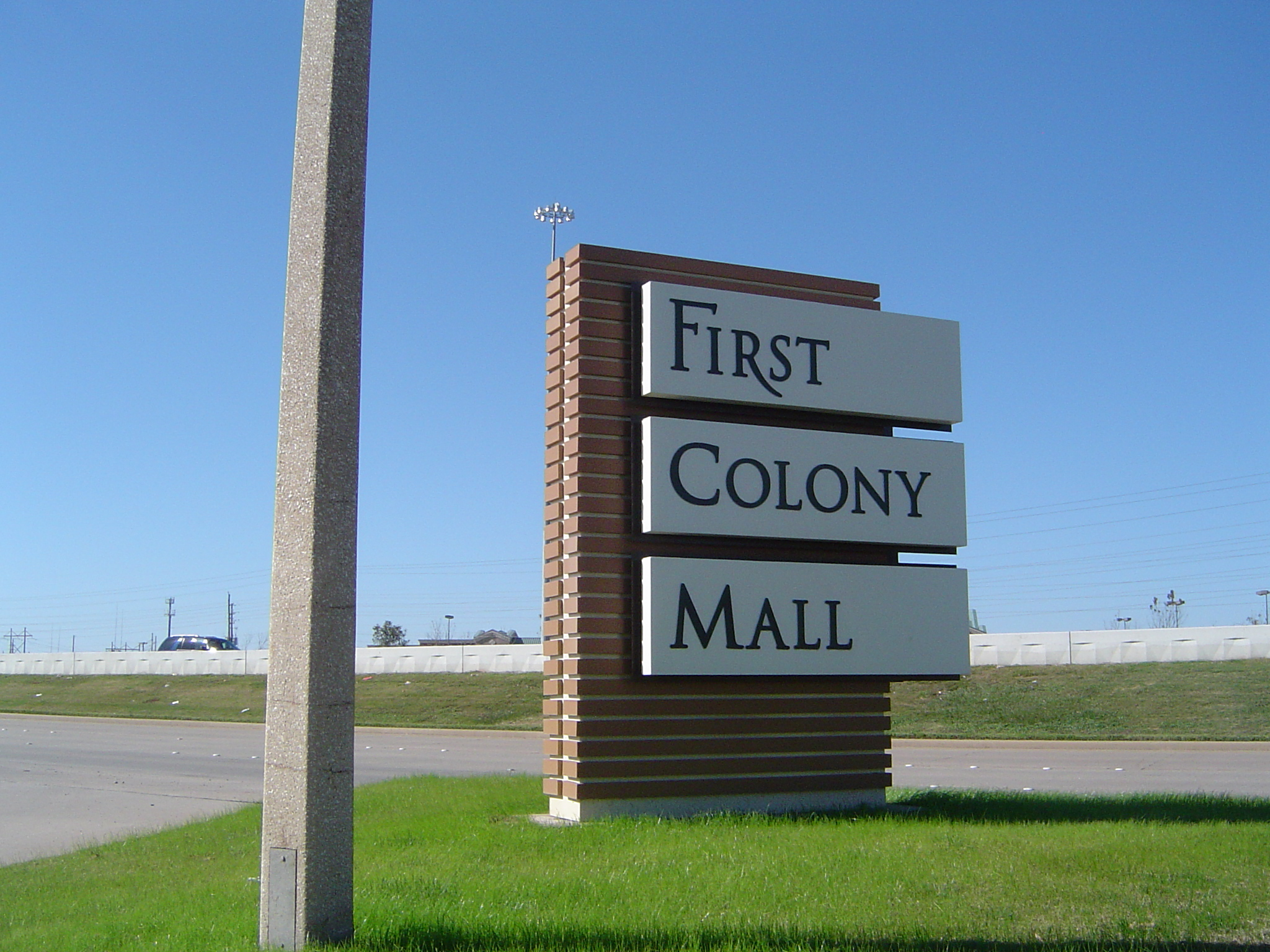
- Sign at I-69/US 59 freeway entrance
- Location: Sugar Land, Texas, United States
- Coordinates: 29.5914°N 95.6256°W
- Address: 16535 Southwest Freeway
- Opened: March 14, 1996 (30 years ago)
- Developer: Hines Interests Limited Partnership
- Manager: GGP
- Owner: GGP
- Num. of stores: 150
- Num. of anchor tenants: 5
- Floor area: 1,110,000 sq ft (103,000 m^{2}).
- Floors: 1 (2 in anchors and Dillard's parking garage, 3 in Macy's parking garage)
- Parking: 4,700 spaces
- Website: firstcolonymall.com

First Colony Mall is a regional shopping mall in Sugar Land, Texas, located about 25 miles (40 km) southwest of Houston. The mall — located south of the intersection of Interstate 69/U.S. Route 59 and State Highway 6—opened on March 14, 1996 and was recently expanded in 2006. First Colony Mall is owned by GGP, a subsidiary of Brookfield Properties. The anchor stores are Macy's, JCPenney, Dick's Sporting Goods, and 2 Dillard's stores. There is also a 24-screen AMC Theatres complex located on an outlying parcel southeast of the mall.

== History ==
The mall had been planned as a key component of the First Colony master-planned community since its planning stages. Before the mall's opening, many Fort Bend County residents often traveled to Sharpstown Mall, Westwood Mall or West Oaks Mall for retail services. Construction was delayed for several years due to the economic fallout in Houston from the 1980s oil glut as well as a competing mall proposal in the nearby New Territory development by that community's developer, which sought to build a mall at the northeast intersection of U.S. 59 and the Grand Parkway a few miles further west. Eventually, the First Colony proposal came to fruition and the land for the proposed mall at New Territory has since become the planned community of River Park, which itself was eventually annexed into Sugar Land.

First Colony Mall opened on March 14, 1996 as the first regional shopping mall in Fort Bend County, originally developed by First Colony developer Sugarland Properties, a partnership of Hines Interests Limited Partnership (which developed The Galleria) and a pension fund associated with Royal Dutch Shell. The mall was built with a single-level format similar in design to nearby West Oaks Mall that was positioned as being "family-friendly", with carpeted walkways and skylights; original anchors were Foley's, Dillard's, JCPenney and Mervyn's (the latter store of which opened as the first (and only) Mervyn's California in Greater Houston), along with over 100 stores and a food court, dubbed the Sugar Land Cafes. Most notably, First Colony became the second mall in Houston since The Galleria (the first being West Oaks) to open without a Sears store, a fact that was unsurprising as Sears had successful locations at Westwood and West Oaks (whose Sears replaced a former Saks Fifth Avenue in 1990), and would gradually decline in prominence over the years.

Upon opening, the mall's opening directly impacted both Sharpstown and Westwood malls, with the latter closing in 1998 and converting to a technology-focused office complex. The mall also had a gradual impact on West Oaks Mall, which drew a large customer base from Sugar Land and Fort Bend County since its 1984 opening, but still continued to draw customers from its trade area in Houston's Energy Corridor as well as the nearby Greater Katy area.

On February 16, 1998, a tornado damaged the mall and the Sugar Land Aerodrome ice skating complex located south of the mall. The tornado hit the southwest corner of the Dillard's store and caused a support wall to collapse; part of the interior was damaged and 5-6 inches of water accumulated inside the store. The tornado also damaged an exterior wall at the JCPenney store, part of the roof, and the mall's sprinkler system, resulting in water damage to several specialty stores in the mall. No one was injured in the tornado, which was surprising given the President's Day shopping crowd present at the mall that day, although two patrons in the nearby ice skating complex sought medical attention on their own.

In 2002, General Growth Properties, which had previously overtaken management responsibilities for the mall around 1999, acquired First Colony Mall outright from its original owners.

=== 2006 expansion ===
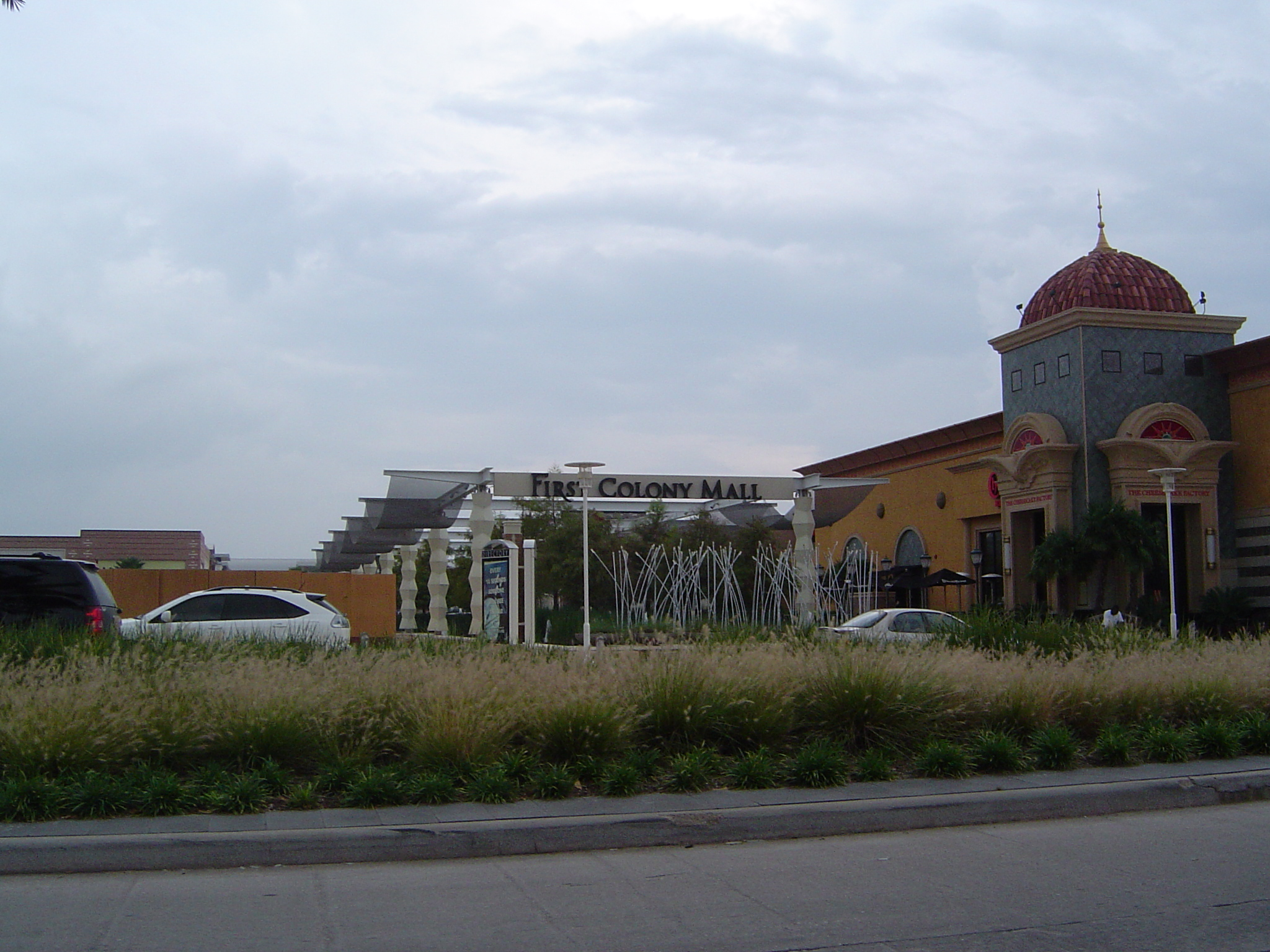
Lifestyle Center expansion from S.H. 6 entrance

Over time, as the Sugar Land area grew both physically and economically, and Sharpstown began to lose more prominent national chains, First Colony Mall slowly began to add more upscale stores such as Williams Sonoma (which has since closed) and newer concepts including Hollister Co. to its specialty store lineup. In 2005, the mall's first anchor change occurred when Mervyn's announced it would close its First Colony location as the chain exited Houston entirely. At the same time, the mall underwent an expansion that added an open-air "lifestyle" wing in front of the main entrance, anchored by bookseller Barnes & Noble which relocated from an adjacent shopping center and a courtyard of restaurants including The Cheesecake Factory and Grimaldi's Pizzeria. The expansion resulted in the addition of several upscale stores as well as a minor re-merchandising of the mall's inline tenants, including a new Apple Store.

Since the lifestyle wing was built on the front parking lot, parking garages were also built in front of the Dillard's and Foley's stores to alleviate parking problems created by the new addition, and traffic lights were also installed at the intersection of Town Center Boulevard North and the east side of the mall's ring road to alleviate extreme traffic problems at the main entrance. Shortly after the completion of the "lifestyle" wing, another anchor change occurred as Foley's converted to Macy's in September 2006 following Federated Department Stores' acquisition of Foley's parent company, May Department Stores the prior year. Dillard's would also fill the former Mervyn's location, focusing on men's clothing and housewares, by 2009. As of 2014, the mall has over 140 stores with a tenant mix consisting largely of a mix of traditional mall tenants and higher-end retailers—–indicative of the surrounding area's affluent demographics.

The mall's surrounding area has also evolved with the addition of Sugar Land Town Square, numerous "big box" retail centers, a Sugar Land campus of Houston Methodist Hospital, and a 24-screen AMC Theatres cinema that is also one of the few multiplex cinemas in Greater Houston to feature a constant mix of first-run blockbusters, independent films, documentaries and foreign films which reflect the diversity and economic strength of the Sugar Land area.

On November 30, 2015, it was reported that Dick's Sporting Goods will construct a new store at First Colony Mall, which opened in October 2016. The store, one of six added across the Greater Houston region (all but one at malls owned by Brookfield Properties, is located adjacent to the former exterior food court entrance. Other new additions since then include Texas de Brazil and Dimassi's Mediterranean Buffet.
