= Alief, Houston =

Alief
- Community
- Location within the state of Texas Alief (the United States)
- Coordinates: 29°42′40″N 95°35′47″W
- Country: United States
- State: Texas
- County: Harris
- City: Houston
- Settled: 1894
- Annexed by Houston: 1967

Area
  - Total: 14.13 sq mi (36.6 km^{2})
- Elevation: 79 ft (24 m)

Population (2015)
  - Total: 106,657
  - Density: 7,548/sq mi (2,914/km^{2})
- Time zone: UTC-6 (CST)
  - Summer (DST): UTC-5 (CDT)
- ZIP codes: 77411, 77099, 77072
- Area codes: 281, 346, 713, 832
- GNIS feature ID: 1329364

Alief (/ˈeɪliːf/ AY-leef) is a working-class suburb in Southwest Harris County, Texas, United States. Most of Alief is within the city limits of Houston, while a portion of the community is in unincorporated Harris County.

First settled in 1894 as a rural farm community, Alief experienced rapid population growth in the 1970s and 1980s. The community became one of the most ethnically diverse areas in Houston.

== History ==
=== Early settlement (1861–1917) ===
In 1861, Reynolds Reynolds claimed 1,250 acres (5.1 km^{2}) of land near Brays Bayou. The land was sold to Jacamiah Seaman Daugherty in 1888 and in the following year, he allowed the San Antonio and Aransas Pass Railway to build on his land. Daugherty sold his land in 1893 to Francis Meston who planned to engineer a community. Daugherty stayed to oversee land sales in Meston's Houston office. In 1894, the community was surveyed and recognized by Harris County. Surveyors named the town Dairy, Texas. The first two town settlers, Dr. John S. Magee and his wife, Alief Ozelda Magee, moved from Ellis County to Dairy the same year.

The Railroad Depot 1902

Alief Ozelda Magee, acting as the town's first postmistress, applied to open the first post office in 1895. On August 16, 1895, the post office opened. The postal service referred to the office as "Alief" in her honor to help avoid confusion with mail intended for the similarly named town of Daisy, Texas. The site of the post office, which was operated from her home, was honored with a Texas State Historical Marker in 1990. The marker (number 10644) is located on the south side of 7th Street between F Street and G Street.

Meston deeded property to Dr. John S. Magee, Newton Gentry, and Hardy Price for use as a cemetery in 1900. Alief Ozelda Magee, who died in 1899, is buried in the cemetery. The cemetery is located at what is now the intersection of Bellaire Blvd. and Dairy Ashford. The Texas Historical Commission recognized Alief Cemetery with a historical marker (number 10589) in 1984.

The Flood of 1899 and the Galveston Hurricane of 1900 destroyed the Methodist Episcopal Church along with the town's cotton and corn crops, forcing 24 of the 30 families that resided in Alief to relocate. The town reverted to prairie and wolves openly roamed during daytime. Daugherty found a positive side to the flooding; he persuaded the remaining six families that rice was better suited to grow in Alief's flood plains than previous crops and spent his own money to help cultivate the first rice crops. Daugherty succeeded: his rice became an instant cash crop that persuaded many to return to Alief. In 1901, Alief's first immigrant families, a small group of Germans arrived. In 1904, the majority of those who had left in the wake of the 1900 hurricane returned. The rapid growth period created a commercial district along the railroad tracks, convincing the San Antonio & Aransas Pass Railway to construct a depot.

Due to its propensity for flooding, the citizens established the Harris County Flood Control District in Alief in 1909. The chairman of the Harris County Drainage District was Daugherty. Trustees S.B. (Shorter) Burleson and Will and Eddie Garmond for the Prairie Grove Missionary Baptist Church purchased land in 1910 which would later become the church's home. The historic African American church's congregation met in the home of S.B. (Shorter) Burleson before the construction of the sanctuary. Credit for the church's name is primarily attributed to Mamie Burleson. In 1911, the Dairy School District was established and a three-story school was built.

The town was officially renamed "Alief, Texas" in 1917 and the Dairy School District became the Alief Independent School District (Alief ISD).

=== Development (1918–1969) ===
Automobiles arrived in Alief by 1920. The sanctuary for Prairie Grove Missionary Baptist Church was constructed between 1921 and 1922. The Cane Belt Canal, which "ran from the Brazos River, eight miles north of Richmond, through Alief and south to Alvin," according to the Westchase District, was completed in 1934. Daugherty promoted the canal, which was used for irrigation by rice farmers. The year after the canal was completed, Alief obtained electricity. Education in Alief was segregated. From 1927 to 1937, African American children used Prairie Grove Missionary Baptist Church's sanctuary as a schoolhouse. Previously, African American children attended school in a one-room schoolhouse. Alief ISD's three-story schoolhouse was condemned in 1939, and its students attended classes in a nearby building until a new school annex was added in 1940. Also in 1940, one of their 11 children, Melissa Outley, died at 19. She is the first to be buried at the Prairie Grove cemetery, which was adjacent to Prairie Grove Missionary Baptist Church. Parthenia Outley was married to David Outley, both of whom were born in 1886. Parthenia died in 1967, and David died in 1981.He was the first African American educator in Alief as he created the one room schoolhouse aforementioned.David E. Outley has a school named in his honor in Alief located at 12355 Richmond Ave., Houston, TX 77082. The church's sanctuary was demolished in the 1940s as attendance fell. Alief Community Church first opened its doors in 1941. Population fluctuated wildly, ranging from a low of 35 in the 1930s to 200 by 1942. Alief acquired telephone service in 1943. E.W.K. "Andy" Andrau opened Andrau Airpark in 1946. In 1964, Alief ISD built its oldest remaining school, Alief Elementary School (later renamed for teacher Cynthia Youens). By the same year, oilman Robert E. "Bob" Smith owned 11,000 acres of land including what is now the Westchase area.

=== Growth, diversification, and annexation (1970–1989) ===
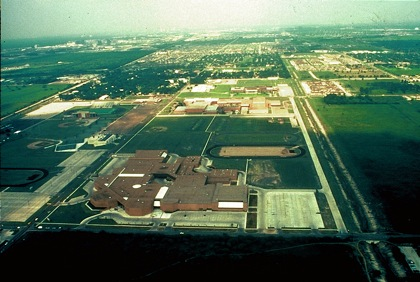
Aerial view of Alief in 1977

In 1970, Alief was still primarily pastureland and major thoroughfares, such as the Sam Houston Tollway, were still gravel roads. The 1970s were a prosperous time for Houston, and Alief continued to grow as people came to the area in search of housing. Houston began expanding westward with the development of River Oaks and Memorial, and the trend continued to Alief. Many of the new residents were low-income apartment dwellers. The community's population increased by a factor of four between 1970 and 1985. Between 1980 and 1985, approximately a third of the population growth experienced by Harris County occurred in the southwest quadrant of the county bounded by the Katy and South (288) freeways, with Alief accounting for half of that, or one-sixth of the overall growth of the county during that five-year time frame. The Alief Independent School District struggled to find room for all of the new students.

As the population of Alief increased in the 1980s, the community began to diversify. In 1978, close to 80% of the people in the community were white. Less than 4% of the people in the community were African American. The shift was primarily for socio-economic reasons. Many low-income Spanish-speaking immigrants settled in traditionally low-income areas of Houston inside Loop 610. Many African-Americans who could afford to left traditional African-American neighborhoods to move to Alief and other parts of Southwest Houston during the 1980s. White people who could afford to move to newer suburbs further from Houston than Alief began to leave the community. In addition, many people of Asian ancestry settled in Alief, Sharpstown, and Westwood, creating one of the largest Asian-American concentrations in Houston. Southwest Houston's Asian population included mainly immigrants from China, the Philippines, India, Pakistan, Vietnam, Cambodia, and Korea. In addition, Southwest Houston became home to many people from Taiwan, Bangladesh, Japan, Laos, and Indonesia. By the late 1980s, white students accounted for less than half of the students enrolled in Alief ISD.

In addition changes in population and demographic, the community underwent several other important changes. Robert E. "Bob" Smith died in 1973, and his widow sold 760 acres of land to the Westchase Corporation which began developing the Westchase District. Houston began annexing Alief in 1977. The City of Houston voted to annex the Alief-Fondren area on November 23, 1977. In 1978, Brown and Root built a large engineering complex at the corner of Bellaire Blvd. and Beltway 8. Houston continued to annex pieces of Alief into the 1980s. West Oaks Mall opened in 1984 and was annexed by the City of Houston the same year. The community feared that annexation would lead to neglect by Houston's government and protested further annexations. Despite these efforts, Houston succeeded in annexing most of the area. Agriculture began to fade. The last cotton gin in Alief closed in 1976, and the area ceased growing cotton altogether by 1982. Alief was one of the last places where cotton had been grown in Harris County. Dairy, cattle, vegetable production, and rice production also declined. Urban development took the place of agriculture. In the spring of 1985, Houston Fire Station #76 was opened to serve the Alief area. The Alief Branch Library (since renamed the David M. Henington-Alief Regional Library) was also opened in 1985. As a sign of the community's growing diversity, the Houston Chronicle noted that the library staff spoke, "a variety of languages, including Hindi, Mandarin Chinese and Farsi (referring to Persian)," when the library first opened. West Houston Medical Center was constructed in 1985 as well. The Alief General Hospital building was abandoned. The Fame City entertainment complex and water park (which later became Fun Plex and Adventure Bay) held its grand opening in 1986. Fame City featured roller skating, movie theaters, a sound studio, miniature golf, bumper-cars, bowling, alley, games, rides, an arcade, restaurants and shops indoors, and a 10-acre water park outdoors. The Alief Brown and Root building closed in May 1987, but was reopened in November 1988 when the industry saw increased growth. Andrau Airpark was sold to the Camden Trust in 1998, although the airport continued to operate.

=== Population boom (1990–2010) ===
The size and diversity of Alief's population continued to grow. Alief's population increased by 45% from 1990 to 2005. By 1991, Alief ISD was growing at a rate of approximately 1,500 new students per year. Houston City Council District F (which included Alief and Sharpstown) had a population that was approximately 46% white with quickly growing African American, Hispanic, and Asian segments. Previously, District F had a mostly white population. Alief ISD's student population was 24% African American by 1991. By 1993, there were 34% more Asian businesses than there had been in 1982. Canterbury United Methodist Church began offering services in Vietnamese in 1995. By 1996, Alief was one of the most ethnically diverse school districts in the country. The district's students spoke a total of 57 different languages. Christ the King Episcopal Church was offering an "African Thanksgiving Feast" since many of the church members had African heritage. The district's main high schools, Hastings and Elsik, were the two largest high schools in Texas. Alief ISD estimated a total enrollment of 39,000 students in the district, with 8,582 students attending either Hastings or Elsik. Mik Giglio of the Houston Press said in 2000 that in 1997 Alief "was a blend of its affluent, white former self and the predominantly poor, ethnic enclave it has since become." In the first 1991 Mayor of Houston election, most Alief voters voted for Bob Lanier. However, in the community Sylvester Turner, Lanier's opponent, had a large second-most following in terms of votes. In 2008, M. J. Khan represented the District F (which includes Alief). By December 3, 1991, increases in crime and changes of demographics in southwestern Houston neighborhoods led to many challengers desiring to fill the city council seat of District F. By 1997, street signs in Alief near Bellaire and Corporate were in both English and Chinese. The Chinese signs had the Chinese phonetic pronunciations of the English names so that English and Chinese speakers could understand each other. In 1997, Hong Kong Development announced plans to build a center called Hong Kong City at the corner of Bellaire and Boone. The developers hoped that building west of Beltway 8 would move the center of the growing Asian business community further west. The Hong Kong City Mall opened in 1999. At the same time that the African American, Hispanic, and Asian populations increased, the white population decreased. Researchers cited social class differences as the reason most white people moved away from Alief. People with greater financial means of all ethnicities moved to further outlying suburbs with greater amenities and better performing schools during the period, while people with lesser financial means moved into the area to take advantage of newer housing and better amenities and schools than those that they left behind. The change was seen disproportionately in the white population since the white population was disproportionately wealthier. Allen G. Breed of the Associated Press wrote: "Alief is an impoverished, multicultural enclave where many of the business and street signs are in both English and one of several Asian languages. The district's 47,000 students speak nearly 70 tongues, and the number of students qualifying for free or reduced lunch over 70%.".

Many developments in education took place in the 1990s in Alief. In 1993, Alief ISD instituted a rule which made passing the statewide standardized test, the Texas Assessment of Academic Skills (TAAS) Exit Exam, a requirement for high school graduation. Many parents protested the measure. In 1995, voters decided to allow Alief ISD to build the Hastings and Elsik Ninth Grade Centers. In 1998, voters approved funds for Alief ISD to use to build a new high school, which would later become Alief "Doc" Taylor. The period was also marked with political scandals. In 1991, a ballot box from the Boone Elementary polling location containing over 700 ballots went missing after the poll closed.

In late 1994, David M. Henington, the director of the Houston Public Library, retired. In an article about his retirement plans he told the reporter he wanted personal computers placed in all of Houston's branch libraries so that all Houstonians could access the internet "information superhighway" during their visits. In 1996, the Henington-Alief Library began offering free internet access to the public. The service was text-only and was limited to 20 minutes when other users were waiting to use the computers. The move by the Houston Public Library was intended to bring internet access to Houstonians who did not have a home computer and therefore did not have home access to the internet.

The City of Houston did limited purpose annexation in Alief after the year 2000.

In 2005, Alief became home to many Hurricane Katrina evacuees. More than 3,000 evacuees enrolled in Alief ISD schools. Alief ISD spent $12 million to accommodate Hurricane Katrina evacuees in 2005. The United States government promised to reimburse the district, but in 2006 Alief had not yet received the money. Many of the students who were displaced by the hurricane were academically behind their Texas peers. In 2006, former United States President George H. W. Bush and Houston Mayor Bill White led a fundraising campaign to help Alief ISD and other districts pay for educating the displaced students. Between 2005 and 2010 more than 30,000 evacuee families lived in section 8 based apartment complexes throughout southwest Houston. Alief had the biggest concentration of Katrina evacuees in the city. Shortly after Katrina refugees moved in, many areas containing apartment complexes began to rapidly decline. Residents stated, "the neighborhood already had problems with Hispanic gangs but nowhere near as bad as it is now with all the killings." With overcrowded apartments, many landlords were forced to stop leasing to evacuees after numerous violations such as noise, vandalism and domestic violence. Some apartments specifically around Woodfair and Bissonnet streets, became a hotbed for crime. The influx of evacuees caused a major uptick in shootings all across the Southwest region. According to HPD, homicide statics for the Southwest area from the previous ten years were mostly done by Latino men who were gang affiliated. Homicides compared to after evacuees arrived was 10 times higher. Houston's homicide rate has shot up 18% since the storm, and police statistics show that one in every five homicides in the city involved a Katrina evacuee as suspect, victim or both. Residents and community leaders began filing complaints to push out evacuees due to the rise in crime stating, "It's time for them to go home," In response, Houston Police Chief Harold L. Hurtt hired 400 additional officers to deal with the city's evacuee-fueled crime wave. HPD added the rise in murders were committed by New Orleans teenagers from rival housing projects, shooting at each other over long-standing beefs that had amongst each other.

== Cityscape ==
The Alief Community Association defines the boundaries of Alief as, "Westheimer on the north, Sam Houston Tollway on the east, Fort Bend County Line on the west and Interstate 69/U.S. Highway 59 on the south," while the Alief Independent School District boundaries extend as far east as Gessner in some places. The Alief Super Neighborhood Council (ASNC) and the International Management District (IMD) have their own boundaries.

== Government ==
=== Municipal ===
Alief is partially annexed by the City of Houston, and partially unincorporated. This section pertains only to the annexed portion of Alief. Please see the "County" section for unincorporated Alief.

As of 2011 Houston City Council District F covers the parts of Alief in Houston.

The portion of Alief in Houston is within Super Neighborhood #25 Alief. Its recognized council was established on June 25, 2000. Each super neighborhood represents a group of civic clubs, places of worship, businesses, and other institutions and community interests.

Represents	Name	First Elected	District Boundaries
District F	Tiffany D. Thomas	2019	Map of District F (after 2011 redistricting)
At-Large Position 1	Julian Ramirez	2023	All of Houston
At-Large Position 2	Willie Davis	2023	All of Houston
At-Large Position 3	Twila Carter	2023	All of Houston
At-Large Position 4	Alejandra Salinas	2025	All of Houston
At-Large Position 5	Sallie Alcorn	2019	All of Houston

=== County ===
Commissioner	Name	Party	First Elected	Current Term Ends	District Boundaries
Precinct 4	Lesley Briones	Democratic	2022	2026	Map of Precinct 4

=== State representation ===
Senators	Name	Party	First Elected	Current Term Ends	District Boundaries
District 13	Boris L. Miles	Democratic	2017	2027	Map of District 13
District 17	Joan Huffman	Republican	2008	2012	Map of District 17
Representatives	Name	Party	First Elected	Current Term Ends	District Boundaries
District 133	Mano DeAyala	Republican	2023	2027	Map of District 133
District 149	Hubert Vo	Democratic	2004	2027	Map of District 149

=== National representation ===
Senators	Name	Party	First Elected	Current Term Ends	Level
Senate Class 1	Ted Cruz	Republican	2012	December 2024	Junior Senator
Senate Class 2	John Cornyn	Republican	2002	December 2026	Senior Senator
Representatives	Name	Party	First Elected	Current Term Ends	District Boundaries
District 7	Lizzie Fletcher	Democratic	2018	January 2027	

== Demographics ==
In 2015 the Houston portion of the Alief Super Neighborhood had 106,657 people, with 7,544 people per square mile. 49% were Hispanic, 22% were non-Hispanic black, 19% were non-Hispanic Asians, 9% were non-Hispanic whites, and 1% were non-Hispanic others. The median income was $46,187.

The annexed portion of Alief had a population of 108,971 people which was growing at a rate of 1.15% annually in 2009. The City of Houston stated on its website that the "legendary diversity" in Alief "is evident in the large section of Asian residents and businesses along Bellaire Boulevard." According to the Alief Independent School District in 2011, "Virtually every culture of the modern world is represented in [the district's] 45,000 student enrollment; more than 80 languages and dialects are spoken" among its students.

In 2009, the population of the annexed portion of Alief was 11.1% white(non-Hispanic), 28.4% black(non-Hispanic), 21.2% Asian, and 37.9% Hispanic. The number of Asians and Hispanics in the annexed portion of Alief increased between the years 2000 and 2009 while the number of people from all other ethnic groups listed by the City of Houston Planning Department either declined or showed no change. The number of households in the annexed portion of Alief increased from 31,033 in 2000 to 33,654 in 2009. The average size of households in the area increased as well, from 3.15 to 3.22. The median age of residents in the annexed portion of Alief was 29.6 in 2009. The median household income in 2009 was $50,028 annually and the average household income was $54,295 annually for Alief households located in Houston. The unemployment rate increased significantly, from 7.4% in 2000 to 11.5% in the annexed portion of Alief.

In 2000 the Alief Super Neighborhood had 41,820 residents, with 2,962 people per square mile. 31% were Hispanic, 28% were non-Hispanic black, 21% were non-Hispanic Asian, 17% were non-Hispanic white, and 3% were non-Hispanic other.

== Media ==
The major citywide newspaper for Houston is the Houston Chronicle, and the Houston Post previously was a major daily newspaper.

== Education ==
=== Primary and secondary schools ===
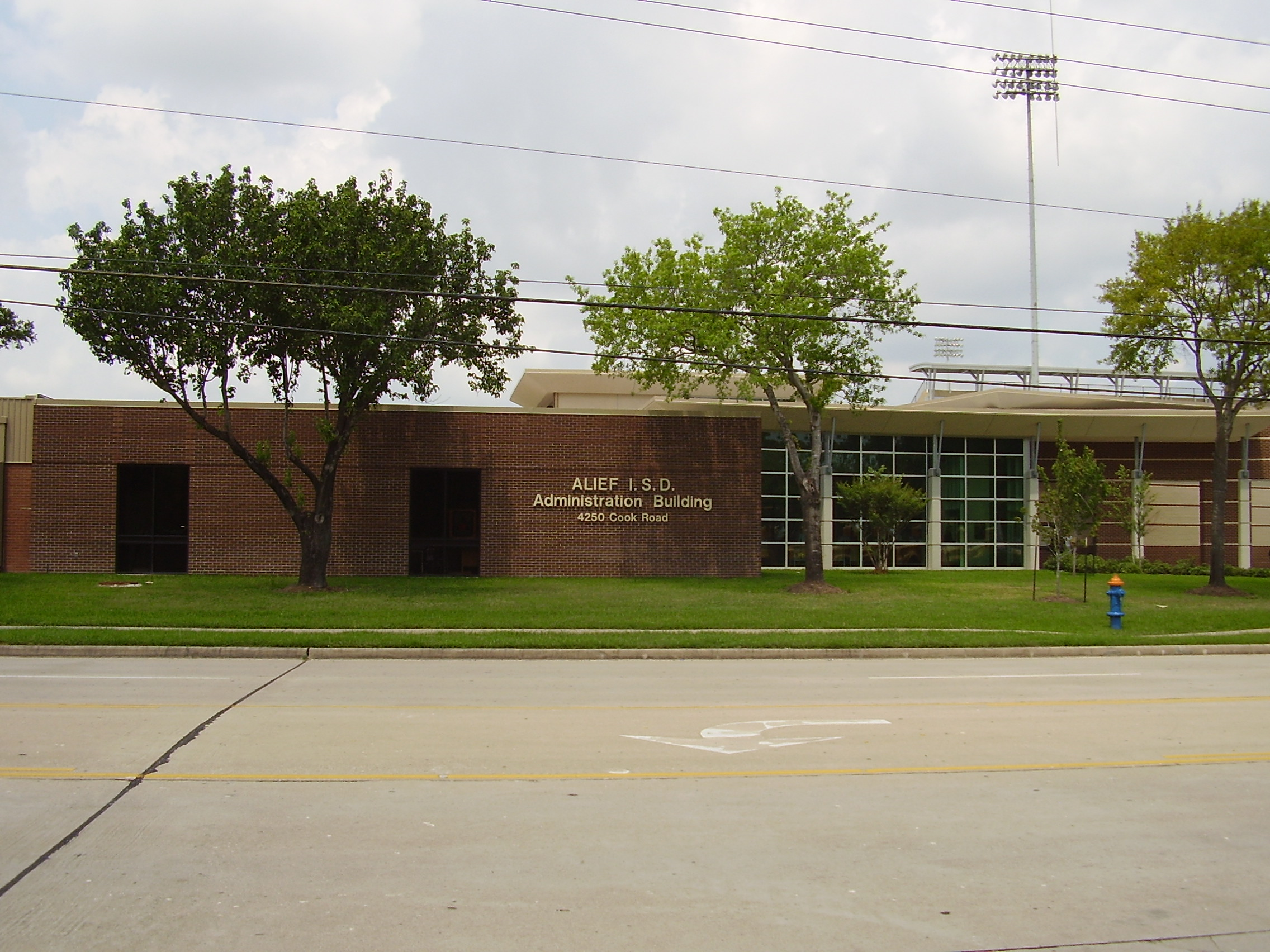
Alief Independent School District headquarters

==== Public schools ====
Public school students the vast majority of areas considered to be Alief are served by the Alief Independent School District (Alief ISD).

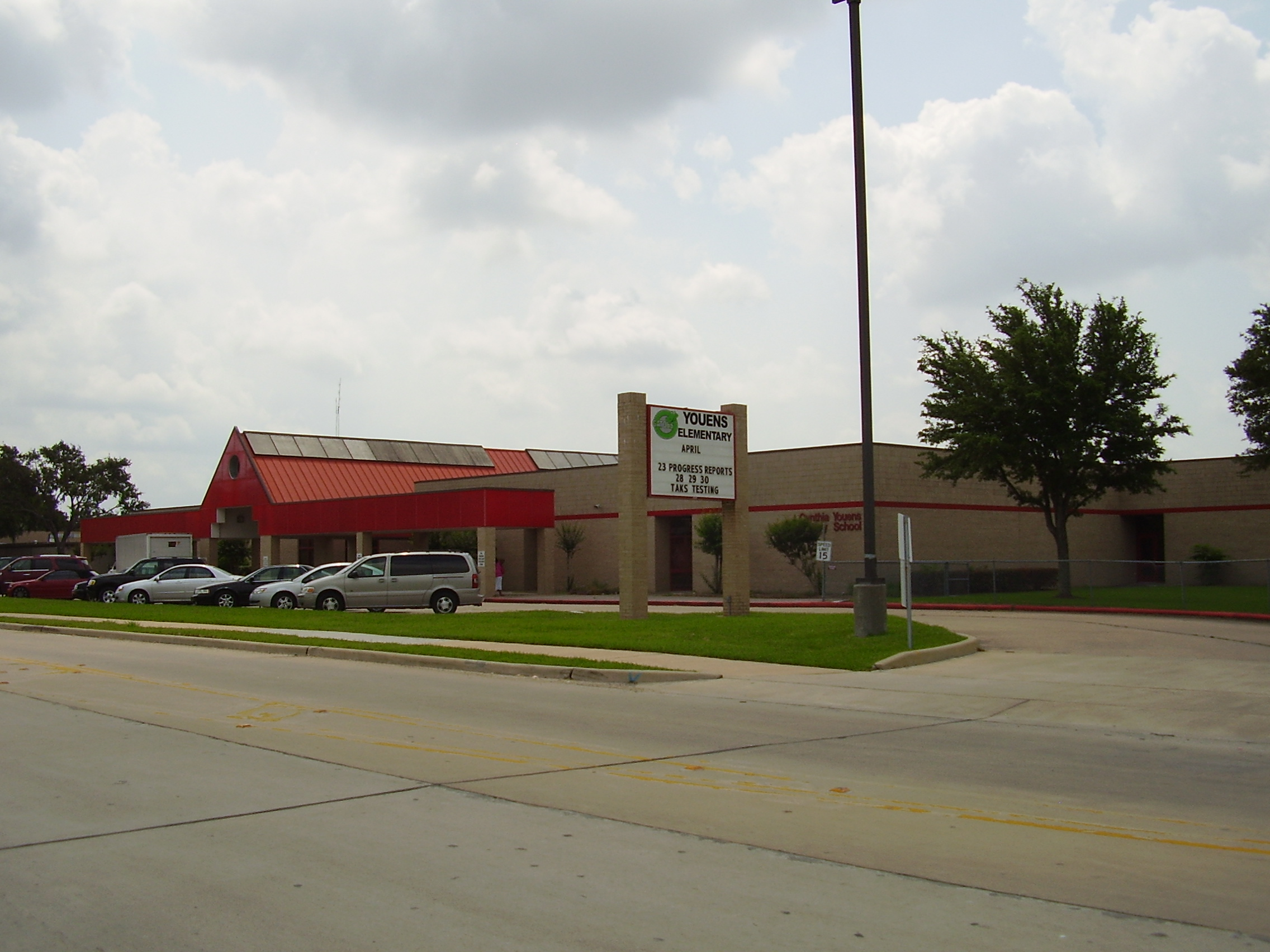
Youens Elementary School

As of 2011, the Alief Independent School District has 24 elementary schools. Youens Elementary and Chancellor Elementary go all the way to fifth grade, however most students are also zoned to an intermediate school for fifth and sixth grade. The district has six intermediate schools as of 2011. Students attend middle school for the sixth through eighth grades. The district has six middle schools as of 2011. High school students in Alief ISD are assigned by lottery to either Alief Elsik High School, Alief Hastings High School, or Alief Taylor High School during October of their eighth grade year. They can also choose to apply for admission to Alief Kerr High School. Students selected to attend Hastings High School attend the Hastings Ninth Grade Center during their ninth grade year, and students selected to attend Elsik High School attend the Elsik Ninth Grade Center during their ninth grade year. It also operates Alief Early College High School, which opened in 2010 and allows students to take courses for dual credit and graduate with both a high school diploma and the equivalence of an associate degree at the same time. The district also has two alternative schools. The Alief Learning Center has its own campus, while the Crossroads/ Night High School/ LINC/ SOAR (Crossroads) meets in the annex between Hastings and Elsik. The Crossroads program is designed for "at-risk students with discipline problems who are behind in academic credit and are at risk of not graduating from high school," as well students who are pregnant or parenting, emancipated minors, and students who have failed the TAKS/ TAAS tests.

A portion of the City of Houston-defined Alief Super Neighborhood within Fort Bend County is in the Fort Bend Independent School District. Some residents are zoned to Meadows Elementary School in Meadows Place along with Dulles Middle School and Dulles High School in Sugar Land, while others are zoned to Townewest Elementary School, Sugar Land Middle School, and Kempner High School.

==== Charter schools ====
Alief is served by multiple charter schools, which are not affiliated with Alief ISD nor Fort Bend ISD.

Alief Montessori Community School is a pre-kindergarten through fifth grade school following Montessori philosophy. Students are typically between 3 and 12 years old. The school is located on 6th Street in the historic townsite of Alief. As of July 2011, the school is undergoing an expansion. Groundbreaking on the expansion was held on March 26, 2010. In 2011, Children at Risk, an education advocacy non-profit, ranked the Alief Montessori among the ten best Houston-area elementary schools. The school has been recognized as an "exemplary school" by the Texas Education Agency every academic year since 1999 and was a recipient of the Honor Roll School Award from the Texas Business and Education Coalition. Its 2011 per-pupil spending of $3,587 was one of the lowest in Houston.

Harmony Public Schools offers two campuses in the Alief area, Harmony School of Innovation (grades K-8) and Harmony Science Academy High (grades 9-12).

Knowledge Is Power Program (KIPP) operates charter schools which serve Alief, including KIPP SHINE Preparatory (pre-kindergarten through grade 4), KIPP Academy Middle School (grades 5-8), KIPP Houston High School (grades 9-12), and KIPP Unity (pre-kindergarten through grade 2).

==== Private schools ====
Christ the Lord Lutheran School is located at 4410 S. Kirkwood Rd. The school instructs preschool through the eighth grade as part of the 4th largest private/parochial school system in the United States, Wisconsin Evangelical Lutheran Synod (WELS). The school has been in operation since 1972.

Strake Jesuit College Preparatory and St. Agnes Academy are located in proximity to Alief.

The Darul Arqam Schools Southwest Campus is located in Alief, Houston, with a Sugar Land postal address.

=== Colleges, universities, and higher education ===
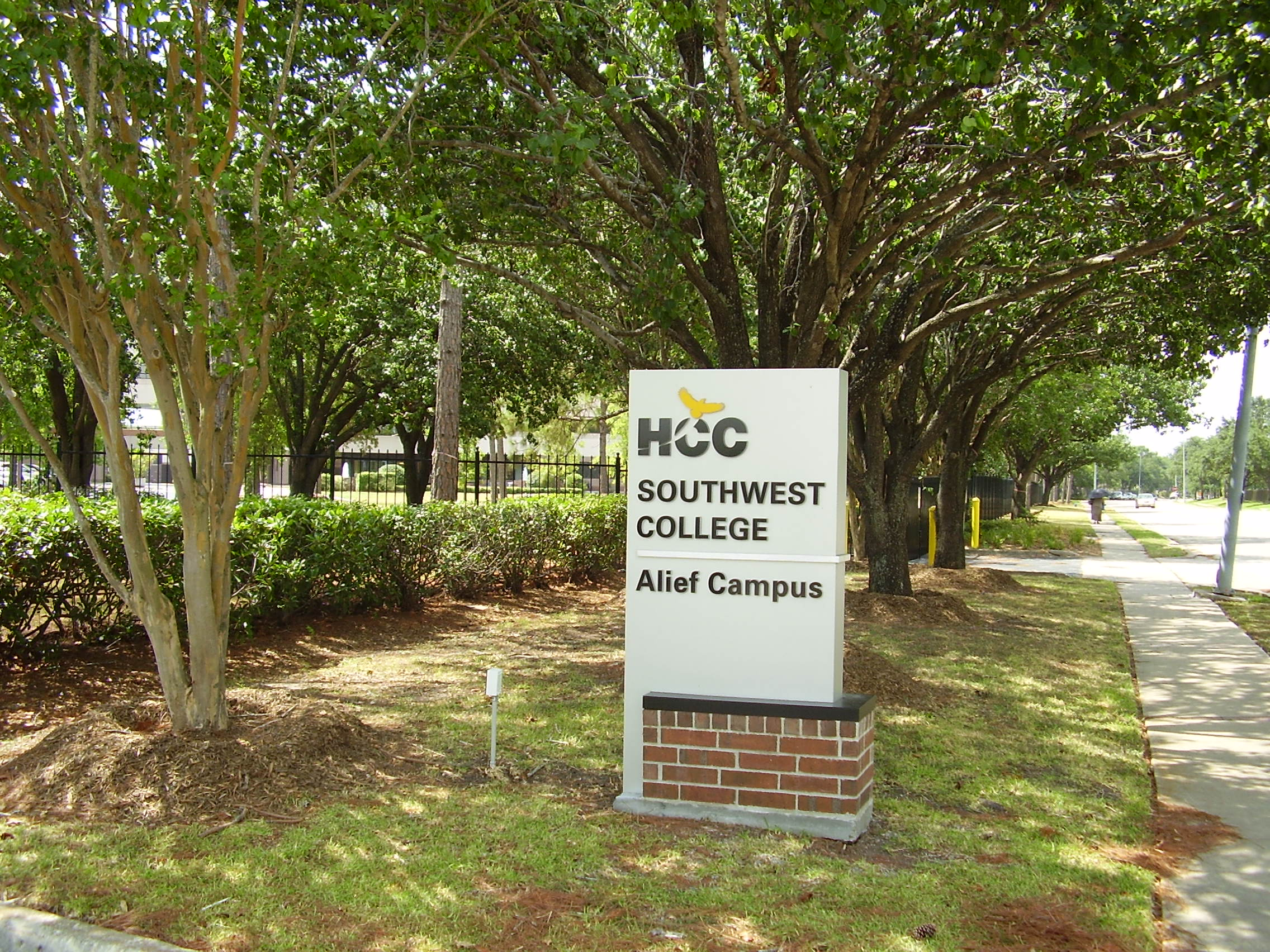
HCC Alief Campus in Westchase

The Houston Community College System (HCCS) has served the Alief area since 1982. The HCC Alief Campus, a part of the Southwest College, is located at 2811 Hayes Road in the Westchase area of Houston. The HCC Alief Continuing Education Center is located at 13803 Bissonnet Road in an unincorporated area in Harris County. In 1982, HCCS expanded classes to Alief Elsik High School. In 2001, HCCS opened the Alief Center on Bissonnet. In 2007, the new Alief Campus in Westchase opened. In 2008, the former Alief Center became the Continuing Education Center.

=== Public libraries ===
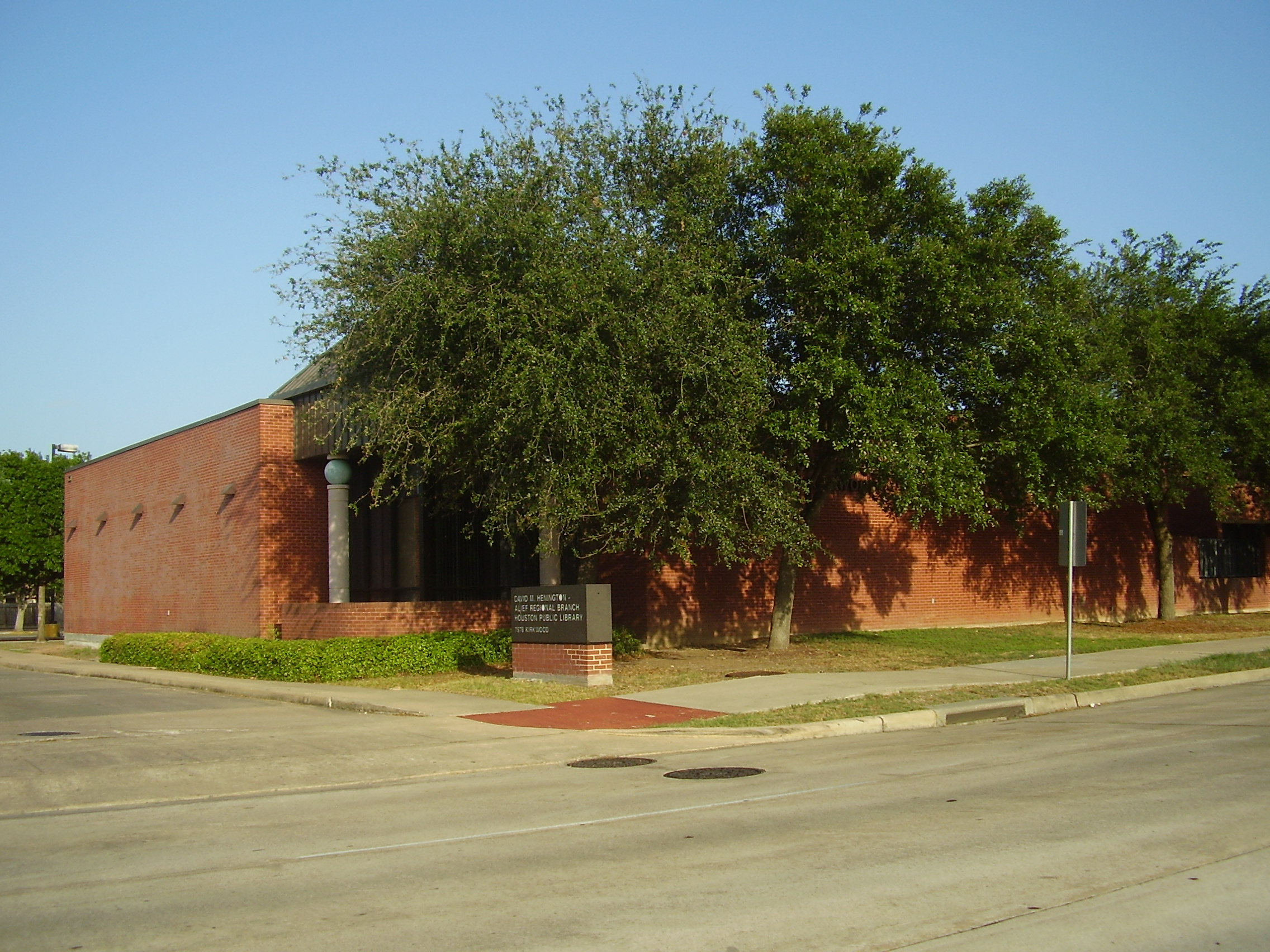
David M. Henington-Alief Regional Library

Alief is served by both the Houston Public Library and the Harris County Public Library.

The David M. Henington-Alief Regional Branch of Houston Public Library is in Alief. The branch is located at 7979 South Kirkwood Street and was originally named the Alief Branch Library when it opened in 1985. The library was later named for David M. Henington, who served as the Director of the Houston Public Library for 26 years. It's now a part of Alief Neighborhood Center. The area is also served by the Judson W. Robinson-Westchase Neighborhood Library of HPL at 3223 Wilcrest Drive, within the Alief ISD boundaries.

Residents of Alief within Harris County may obtain library cards for the Harris County Public Library (HCPL) system. There are no HCPL branches in the Alief area. Fort Bend County Libraries serves the Fort Bend County areas.

== Emergency services ==
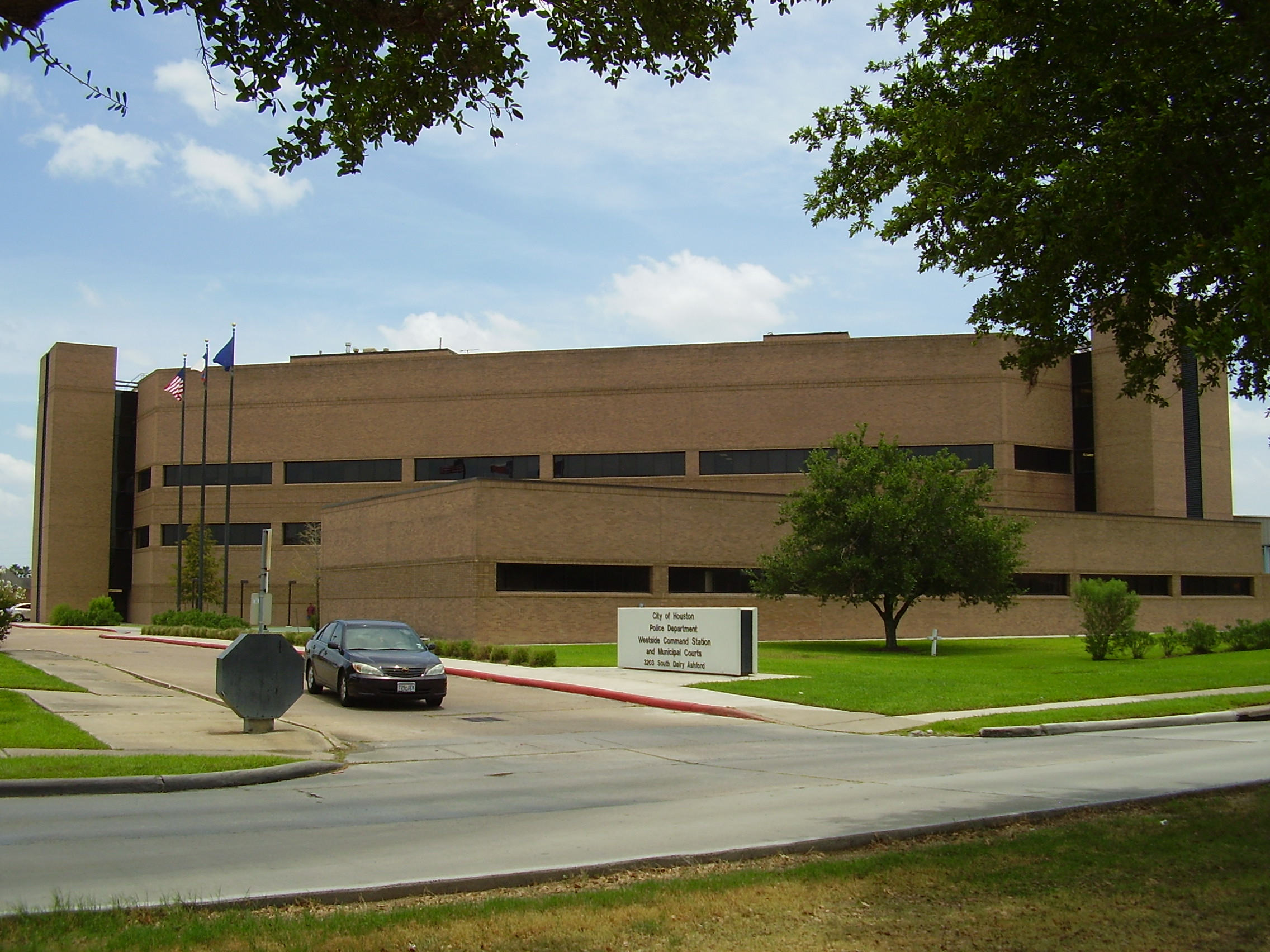
Houston Police Department Westside Division Police Substation and Municipal Courts

=== Fire service ===
Alief residents in Houston receive fire services from the Houston Fire Department. The Houston Fire Department has operated Station 76 Alief Community since 1985. A part of Fire District 83 is also in Alief.

For residents of unincorporated Harris County, emergency medical services (EMS) and fire service are provided by a volunteer fire department, the Community Volunteer Fire Department (CVFD). CVFD is a combination career and volunteer fire suppression and EMS provider which operates two stations in the Alief area. CVFD also has a training center in the Alief area, where a bi-yearly cadet program takes place. A new training center is proposed next door to the current Station 1.

=== Police services ===
Alief is served by the Houston Police Department, which has Alief in the Westside Patrol Division, headquartered at 3203 South Dairy Ashford Road, in the Alief area. In 2000 the police department's Westwood Storefront in the Westwood Mall was scheduled to open before May 2000; it is the first police storefront to open in Alief. Construction delays foiled plans to open the storefront at the end of 1999 and in March 2000.

Harris County Sheriff's Office serves unincorporated sections of Harris County. The Alief area outside of Houston is within the District IV Patrol Bureau, headquartered at the Clay Road Substation at 16715 Clay Road. The Mission Bend Storefront is located at 7043 Highway 6 South.

Alief ISD Police Department serves the Alief Independent School District as its law enforcement agency. Alief ISD Police keep staff, students, facilities and the public safe. Alief ISD Police respond to other agencies in need of assistance in the surrounding Harris County and Houston area.

== Medical services ==
=== Hospital ===
West Houston Medical Center is located on West Houston Center Blvd. The current location was constructed in 1985. West Houston Medical Center is an HCA member hospital. The facility has 410 physicians, 742 total employees, and 195 beds. The center houses an emergency room which had annual visits of 47,156 in the year which was most currently reported as of July 2011. The center also has a cardiovascular services area, a women's center, a cancer center, a gamma knife, and many other services. US News & World Report Health ranked West Houston Medical Center the #18 hospital in Houston as of July 2011.

=== Government-funded healthcare ===
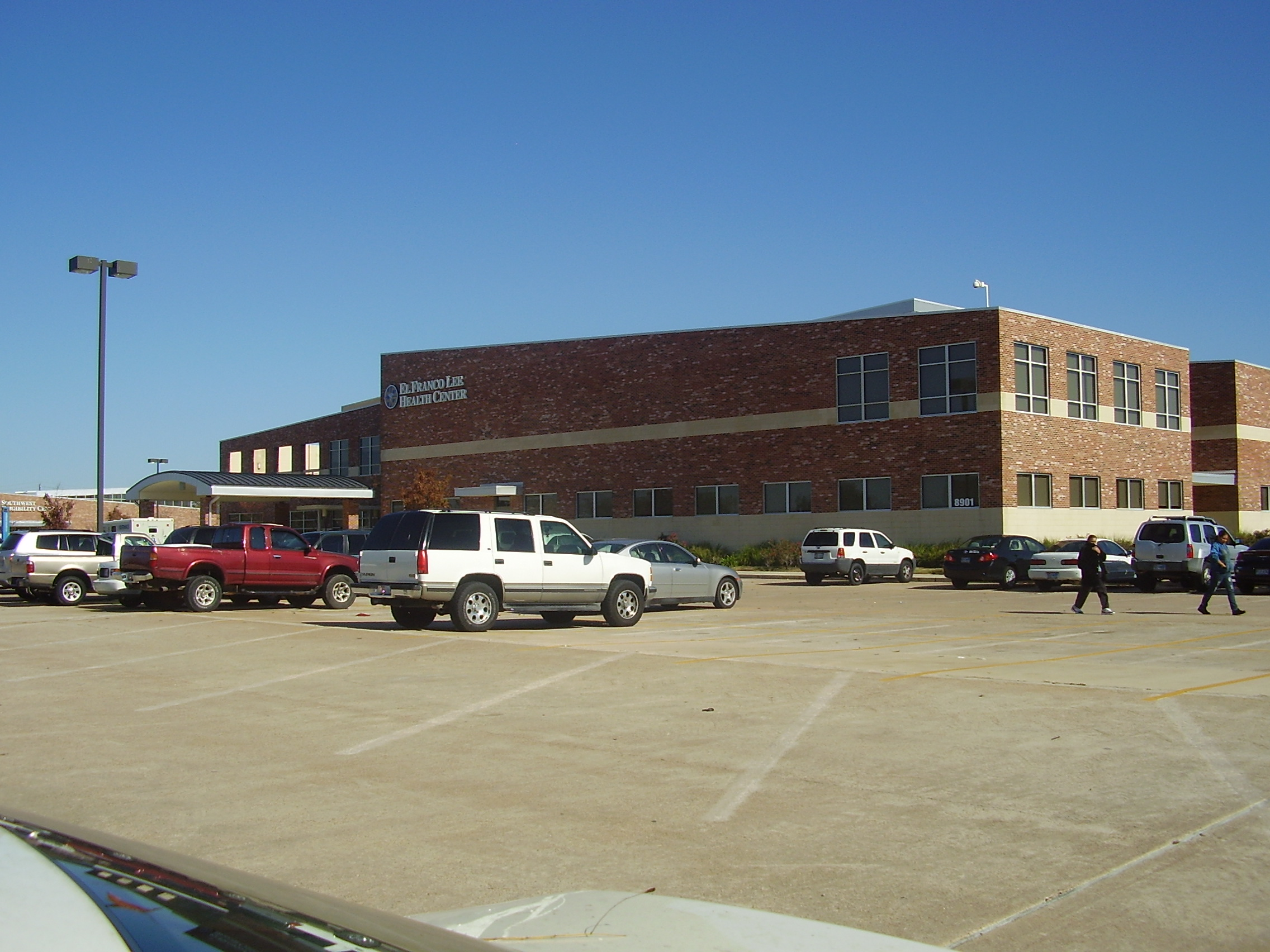
El Franco Lee Health Center

The El Franco Lee Health Center in Alief, operated by Harris Health System (formerly Harris County Hospital District), opened on May 19, 2009. Prior to the opening, the closest facility was the People's Health Center. The district said in a 2006 Houston Chronicle article that it planned to build a health care facility in Alief. The center has 66,000 square feet (6,100 m^{2}) of space. The previous designated health care center was People's Health Center, now Valbona Health Center. The nearest public hospital is Ben Taub General Hospital in the Texas Medical Center.

== Transportation ==
=== Mass transit ===
The Metropolitan Transit Authority (METRO) provides local bus services to the area.

METRO Park & Ride locations in Alief include:

- Gessner Park & Ride located at Westpark at Gessner, Houston, TX 77036 (Considered to be located in Alief when Gessner is considered the boundary line for Alief)
- Mission Bend Park & Ride located at 13855 Alief Clodine Rd. (at METRO Blvd.), Houston, TX 77083
- Westchase Park & Ride located at 11050 Harwin Dr., Houston, TX 77072
- Westwood Park & Ride located at 9990 Southwest Fwy. (south of Bissonnet), Houston, TX 77036 (Considered to be located in Alief when Gessner is considered the boundary line for Alief)

=== Major highways ===
- Westpark Tollway
- Interstate 69 / U.S. Highway 59
- Beltway 8
- State Highway 6

=== Airports ===
Andrau Airpark operated in Alief from 1946 to 1998, when it was closed to make room for the Royal Oaks Country Club and subdivision.

== Parks and recreation ==
The Alief Community is home to public parks maintained by Harris County, public parks maintained by the City of Houston, and private parks and venues.

=== Harris County parks ===
Harris County operates parks throughout Alief which is in Precinct 3. Harris County parks are maintained by the Precinct's Parks Division.

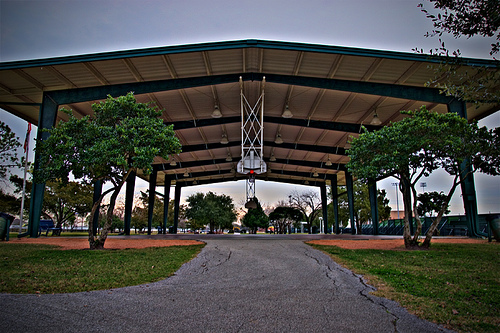
Basketball Courts at Alief-Amity Park

- Alief-Amity Park, an 11-acre (45,000 m^{2}) park located along Westpark Tollway adjacent to Alief Elsik High School. In 1975, the county acquired what is now the park site from the Cloud family. The park was dedicated in the early 1980s. The park, once upon a time, was the site of the original Alief railroad depot.
- Archbishop Joseph A. Fiorenza Park is located north of Westpark Tollway along Eldridge Road in northwest Alief. This park includes a 0.6-mile (0.97 km) trail. Located on part of a Harris County Flood Control District site acquired in 1988, the park was dedicated in June 1999. It is named after Roman Catholic Archdiocese of Galveston-Houston archbishop Joseph Fiorenza.
- Arthur Storey Park is a 175-acre (0.71 km^{2}) green space along Brays Bayou at the intersection of Bellaire Boulevard and State Highway Beltway 8, immediately west of Chinatown. In August 1995, the Harris County Flood Control District began acquiring land along the bayou, and in October of that year it agreed to allow the establishment of a park. The commissioner's court voted to rename the park in January 1997 after Arthur L. Storey Jr., who worked for the Harris County Flood Control District. Storey is credited with "modernizing and streamlining the county's flood control district operations while simultaneously considering [the district's operations'] environmental implications." The park opened and was dedicated on September 26, 1997.
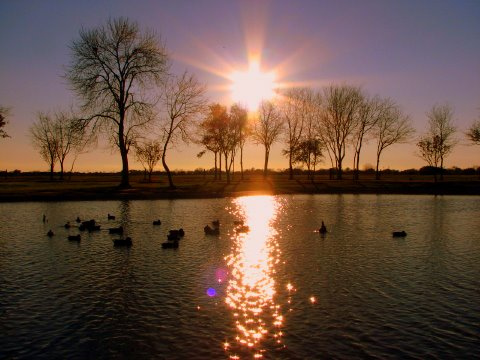
  The duck pond at Arthur Storey Park
- Mike Driscoll Park is a 46-acre (0.19 km^{2}) park located on West Center Boulevard between Westpark Tollway and Brays Bayou. The park hosts a playground and a 1.13-mile (1.82 km) asphalt walking trail.

=== City of Houston parks ===
The City of Houston operates parks in the annexed portion of Alief. City of Houston parks are maintained by the City of Houston Parks and Recreation Department.

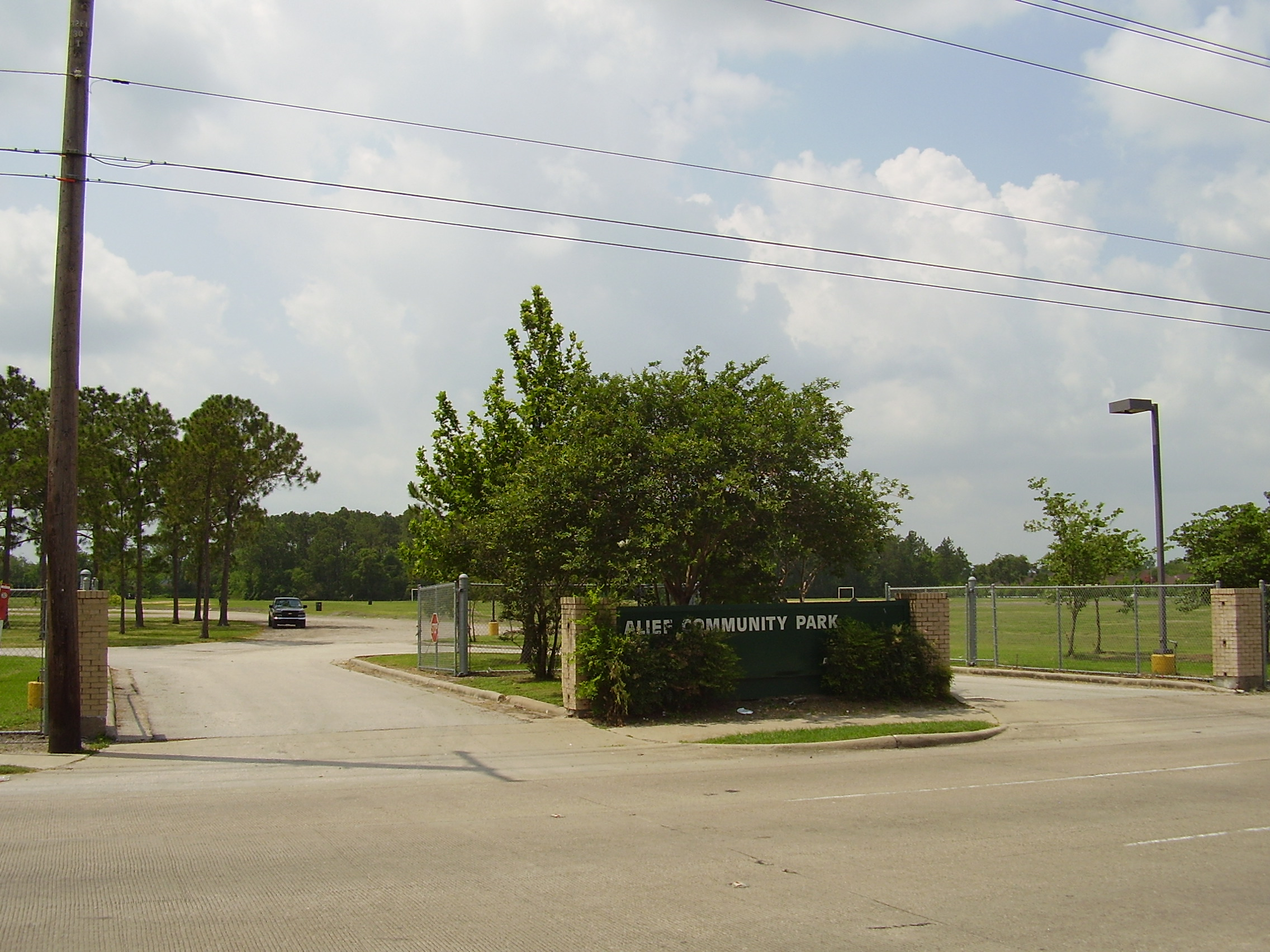
Alief Community Park

- Alief Community Park is a 37.3-acre (0.151 km^{2}) park located at the southwest corner of Bellaire Boulevard and Kirkwood Road. The park was acquired by the City of Houston in 1993 from the First United Methodist Church of Houston for $3.5 million. The city originally named the park Southwest Park, but changed the name to Alief Community Park in 1997. It is home to Alief Community Center and Alief Pool. The park also boasts basketball courts, tennis courts, baseball fields, playgrounds, paved trails, and multi-purpose fields. In 2011, a new hike and bike trail funded by a Texas Department of Transportation grant was constructed. Alief Pool was nearly closed in 2011 due to city budget cuts; however, corporate donors Marathon Oil and ConocoPhillips agreed to sponsor the pool. A new Alief Community Center, with 70,000 square feet (6,500 m^{2}) of space, was being developed in 2022. It was scheduled to have a WIC program center, a skate part, and a public library, the Alief-David M. Henington Regional Library of the Houston Public Library.
- Boone Park is located on Boone Road between Bellaire Boulevard and Beechnut Street. It was created by the City of Houston in 1984, and has since been improved by the city, oil companies, and volunteers. The park's amenities include a 1.06-mile (1.71 km) walking trail system, cricket field, playground, picnic pavilion, and multi-purpose fields, as well as a nature preserve recognized by the Texas Forestry Department.
- Hackberry Park is located 1.5 miles (2.4 km) west of Boone Park on South Dairy Ashford Road between Bellaire Boulevard and Kirkwood Road. The park features a 1-mile (1.6 km) outer-loop trail. In addition, the park has a community center, a sprayground, and a playground. The park is the former home of Hackberry Golf Course and occupies 22.5 acres (0.091 km^{2}). The park was acquired in 2007, at a cost of $5 million, and dedicated in 2009.
- Harwin Park is located in northeast Alief along Harwin Road near the intersection with Wilcrest Drive. It contains multi-purpose fields, a trail system, and a playground. The park is a 8.3-acre (0.034 km^{2}) property and was established in 1989.

== Religion ==
=== Christianity ===
The Roman Catholic Archdiocese of Galveston-Houston operates Notre Dame Church in Alief. It opened in 1969 with 173 families and a 5,000-square-foot (460 m^{2}) church structure with room for 750. From 1970 to 1975 the Continuing Christian Education and parish hall structures were built. By 2008 the church had 2,600 families. It previously used a 13,000-square-foot (1,200 m^{2}) sanctuary. By 2008 it struggled to cope with the demand, so it began building a new sanctuary and day chapel as part of a $5.7 million capital campaign, with 20,280 square feet (1,884 m^{2}) of space. The South Continuing Christian Education structure previously on the site was to be razed. The church's site has 10 acres (4.0 ha) of land.

Ascension Chinese Mission (traditional Chinese: 美華天主堂; simplified Chinese: 美华天主堂; pinyin: Měi Huà Tiānzhǔ Táng; lit. 'US-China Catholic Church') is in the Alief super neighborhood. It originated from a Chinese worship service that was established in the 1970s. The parish was created in 1988, initially operating out of a commercial center in the southwest Houston Chinatown area. It relocated to its current site in Spring 1991.

Christ, The Incarnate Word Church (Vietnamese: Giáo Xứ Đức Kito Ngôi Lời Nhập Thể), also in the Alief super neighborhood, opened in 1998. It is one of five Vietnamese Catholic churches in the Houston area. The archdiocese operates another Alief church, St. Justin Martyr.

Wilcrest Baptist Church is in the area.

=== Other religions ===
Shri Krishna Vrundavana has a Sugar Land postal address, but is physically in the Alief super neighborhood in the Houston city limits. It occupies the 450-person, 9,000-square-foot (840 m^{2}) former La Festa Hall. It was established in 2011 with about 200 people in its congregation; originally the temple rented its property. In October 2015 the temple organizers bought the current site for $1.3 million. In December 2015 its congregation had numbered over 800.

The Islamic Society of Greater Houston (ISGH) operates Masjid At-Taqwa (Synott Islamic Center), which has a Sugar Land postal address but is in the Alief super neighborhood in Houston. By the 2000s Alief had the highest percentage of Muslims in Houston and the Greater Houston area overall.

== Community events and festivals ==
=== Lunar New Year Festival ===
The Lunar New Year Festival is an annual event which was first held in 1996. The event has featured dancing, cooking, and a beauty contest. The festival claims to be the "largest international celebration in the southwest."

=== International Parade ===
The International Parade was first held in 2008. The parade is held annually near the end of September. The parade strives to include many different ethnic groups and promote the diversity of the community. The route travels down Bellaire Blvd.

== See also ==
- Alief Independent School District
- Wilcrest Baptist Church
