= Lakeway Airpark =

Private airport in Travis County, Texas, US

- IATA: none; ICAO: none; FAA LID: 3R9

Summary
- Airport type: Public
- Owner/Operator: Lakeway Airpark, Inc.
- Serves: Lakeway, Texas
- Location: Lakeway, Texas
- Elevation AMSL: 909 ft (277 m)
- Coordinates: 30°21′27″N 097°59′40″W
- Website: www.3r9.org

Map
- Location within Texas

Runways
Direction	Length		Surface
Direction	ft	m	Surface
16/34	3,930	1,198	Asphalt

Statistics (2024)
- Aircraft operations: 9,855
- Based aircraft: 61
- Source: Federal Aviation Administration

Lakeway Airpark (FAA LID: 3R9) is a privately owned, public use airport in Travis County, Texas, approximately 17 nautical miles (31 km) west of downtown Austin. The airport serves general aviation and is owned and operated by Lakeway Airpark, Inc., a Texas nonprofit corporation. It features a single asphalt runway and primary accommodates privately owned single-engine airtcraft.

== History and Ownership ==
The present-day Lakeway Airpark originated as a private airstrip constructed sometime between 1929 and 1936 on the Clifton George Ranch. In the early 1960s, the property was acquired by the Lakeway Company as part of its planned resort development, and the runway was paved and improved in 1964. During the late 1970s, the airport evolved into a residential airpark with the construction of hangar homes connected to the runway by private taxiways. The runway was extended to approximately 3,930 feet in 1986, and displaced thresholds were added.

Following the dissolution of the original Lakeway development, the airpark property was acquired by Hillwood Development Corporation before being sold in 1995 to a group of local airpark homeowners, who established Lakeway Airpark, Inc., a Texas nonprofit corporation to own and operate the airport. In 2003, the runway thresholds were modified to accommodate an RNAV (GPS) approach to Runway 16.

The airport briefly had scheduled passenger airline service during the mid 1970s when Bee Line (air carrier), a small commuter air carrier based in the Houston area, was operating flights on the weekends with small twin prop aircraft from both Houston Hobby Airport and Andrau Airpark in the west Houston area and the Lakeway Airpark. Today, by airpark rules and city ordinance, scheduled service is not allowed and the size of aircraft is restricted to 12,500 lbs., resulting in 95% of operations being small single and twin engine aircraft.

== Facilities and Aircraft ==
Lakeway Airpark covers an area of 39 acres (16 ha) at an elevation of 909 feet (277 m) above mean sea level. It has one runway designated 16/34 with an asphalt surface measuring 3,930 by 70 feet (1,198 x 21 m). The airpark has aviation fuel for sale, a pilot building and a public restroom. The Airpark maintains an asphalt ramp that has 32 marked parking spots and 3 additional grass tie downs and 2 additional helicopter parking spots.

As of 2025 it counted 32 residences surrounding the airpark with 30 of them having attached taxiways and hangars on residential properties. In addition there are six freestanding condo style hangar buildings on airpark property that can each house four small aircraft. Additionally there are three larger non-residential hangars on AV (Aviation District) zoned adjoining property not owned by the Airpark. There is also a single "Hail Shed" on the ramp which is leased out annually.

For the 12-month period ending December 31, 2024, the airport had 9,855 general aviation aircraft operations, an average of 27 per day or about 1 take off and 1 landing each hour during the roughly 12 hours of daylight opening hours (closed at night). During this same period there were 61 aircraft based at this airport: 95% single-engine and 5% multi-engine.

== Community & Safety ==
The Lakeway Airpark is open for visitors from sunrise to sunset 365 days a year. It boasts a "Pilot Shack" with a public restroom, picnic tables and a grass area for visitors along with a small auto parking lot with about 25 spaces. The Airpark focuses on maintaining open, permeable space, trees, bushes, grass and bluebonnets. Landscaping is ongoing. Members of the community are welcome to visit. Children must be accompanied by an adult.

The Airpark hosts open house events to showcase aircraft and allow visitors to meet pilots on the 2nd Saturdays of April, July and October. During these events the public can be educated about becoming a pilot, what it's like to own and fly an aircraft, flight safety and the value of general aviation. Guided field trips for students and clubs are available. The Airpark web site notes that it is especially sensitive to its neighbors and works to address any questions.

The runway should always be considered active and for aircraft only. Posted rules remind visitors to stay away from the runway and to be extremely vigilant on the ramp; aircraft can (and do) start at any time. The taxiways are active and for aircraft only. Auto traffic is allowed only to transit to and from the parking lot; no standing at the entrance or on the ramp unless loading/unloading an aircraft. The airpark is closed from Sunset to Sunrise.

The airpark has an excellent safety record. According to the NTSB and FAA, the airpark has (approximately) a 50% lower accident rate than similar airports in the U.S., registering a total of 5 accidents (aircraft not airworthy after the event) and 11 incidents (reported to NTSB but aircraft can be flown) since 1964. The national safety rate for general aviation aircraft has been improving since 1989, according to the NALL report, which compiles NTSB statistics. GA (General Aviation) is now 18% safer than in 1990.

== Benefits to Lakeway ==
The Lakeway Airpark provides access to general aviation from within the City of Lakeway, making it easy for pilots and their family and friends to enjoy the benefits of aviation locally or throughout Texas. As a destination city with vacation amenities, the airpark attracts visitor pilots and their guests. The economic activity associated with the airpark is estimated to be in the millions per year. Overnight stays at the Lakeway Resort and other hotels along with golf outings, Lake Travis boating, dining, sports and more all contribute to the local economy. The airpark also processes sales tax. Residents who buy aircraft in Lakeway pay sales tax, some of which goes to the City of Lakeway.

The airpark is also an entry point for children and young adults (and adults of any age) who wish to pursue a career in aviation through airline, military or private commercial flying. While primary training is not allowed at the airpark (except for aircraft owners and their family), being able to access pilots firsthand, observe aircraft operations and listen to the radio chatter on the speaker at the 'Pilot Shack' has sparked more than one person to pursue their private pilot license. Many birthday parties and special events are held at the visitor area each year, at no charge.

The airpark is used for medical flights, firefighting, and can be used for emergency command and staging by disaster services (if needed). It is an important 'first responder' asset for the City of Lakeway and Travis county.

The airpark takes no money from any government, including the City of Lakeway. It is self funded. It pays annual property tax and pays sales tax collected from fuel sales, some of which goes to the City of Lakeway.

Notable airpark pilots: Famed Dallas Cowboys coach Tom Landry was based at the airpark in the 1970s and 1980s. Astronaut Alan Shepard flew in and out of the airpark all through the 1970s, keeping a blue station wagon at the ramp. WWII veteran bomber pilot, winner of several Reno Air races and co-founder of the Commemorative Air Force (CAF), Lefty Gardner lived off the 16 end of the runway until 2006 and kept his Stearman, P-38 Lightning and P-51 Mustang in his backyard. Famed oil firefighter Red Adair lived just across the street from the airpark.

== Governance and Membership ==
The Lakeway Airpark Corporation was formed in 1995 as a Texas not-for-profit with the purpose of maintaining the airpark and access to it for airpark members. Members consist of homeowners with taxiways that connect to the runway, stand alone hangar owners, aircraft owners with tie down leases and booster members. Each member has certain voting rights to affect who is on the seven member board, make changes to the Charter and vote on other matters that the board sees fit. The Board of Directors consists of seven airpark members who are all volunteers, are elected on a rotating schedule and who serve two year terms. The board has open meetings once a month at the airpark. These meetings are focused on good airpark stewardship with safety a top priority. Topics such as general airpark safety, rules enforcement, maintenance, public education, pilot education, signage, FAA rules, airpark rules and so forth are regularly discussed. An annual meeting is held in June.

The mission of the Airpark is to "Provide safe access to the benefits and joys of general aviation for its member homeowners & pilots, Lakeway residents and the Lake Travis area."

== See also ==
- List of airports in Texas
