= Wilcrest Baptist Church =

Church in Houston, Texas, USA

Coordinates: 29.6998°N 95.5697°W

Wilcrest Baptist Church is a Baptist church in Houston Texas. It is affiliated with the Southern Baptist Convention.

== History ==
Wilcrest was founded in 1970 in what was then the primarily Caucasian suburb of Alief, Texas, later annexed as part of Houston. The congregation matched the racial make-up of the community. However, during the 1980s the neighborhood had changed due to a phenomenon sometimes called white flight and had become primarily African-American.

In 1989, the New York Times profiled a wedding conducted in Mandarin, between two graduate students from China whose parents could not attend because of travel restrictions in the wake of the Tiananmen Square Massacre By the early 21st Century the neighborhood around Wilcrest had not only multi-generational blacks, whites, and Latinos, but also new immigrants from Mexico, Nigeria, Cuba, Haiti, and Vietnam.

Former pastor Rodney Woo took over the church in 1992, by which time church membership was only 180 members and attendance was down to 200 per service. Himself interracial (his mother is white; his father part Chinese-American), Woo attended an all-black high school in Port Arthur, Texas. Although there were some calls from members to keep the church segregated, Woo quickly convinced the church to reach out to Christians from many backgrounds, and eventually built attendance up to about 500, including members from 47 nations. Dr. Woo left the church in 2010 to become pastor of International Baptist Church in Singapore.

In 2009, Dr. Rodney Woo wrote, The Color of Church: A Biblical and Practical Paradigm for Multiracial Churches, a book that documents the story of Wilcrest Baptist Church and how other churches can learn to develop more multi-ethnic church congregations.

In June 2011 Jonathan Williams became the senior pastor of Wilcrest Baptist Church.

Since August 2022 Dr. Timothy Melton now serves as the senior pastor at Wilcrest Baptist Church.
