= Andrau Airpark =

Former airport in Houston, Texas, U.S.

- IATA: none; ICAO: KAAP

Summary
- Airport type: General Aviation
- Operator: Closed
- Serves: Houston, Texas
- Elevation AMSL: 80 ft / 24.38 m
- Coordinates: 29°43′00″N 95°35′00″W
- Interactive map of Andrau Airpark

Runways
Direction	Length		Surface
Direction	ft	m	Surface
16/34	4,750	1,447.8	Concrete
11/29	3,000	914.4	Concrete

Andrau Airpark (ICAO: KAAP) was a public use airport located in the Alief community of Houston, Texas, United States, formerly an unincorporated section of Harris County, from the late 1940s through 1998. The airport was southeast of the intersection of Old Westheimer Road (since renamed West Houston Center Boulevard) and Richmond Avenue. The airport closed in 1998 and as of 2008 is the Royal Oaks Country Club subdivision.

== Airport History ==
The first known photo of the area is from 1953. The 700-acre (280 ha) tract of land that included the airport, which was one of the oldest private airfields in Greater Houston, was owned by descendants of the Andrau family.

The airport served general aviation for west Houston, but a Douglas DC-3 and an A-26C Invader are known to have landed there. The airport had two runways, the longest at 4,750 feet, and a seaplane landing and takeoff pond on the east end of the airpark.

Bee Line, a small commuter air carrier based in the Houston area, operated scheduled passenger flights on the weekends with small twin prop aircraft during the mid-1970s between the airport and Lakeway Airpark near Lake Travis in central Texas.

The airport was closed on December 23, 1998, when a Houston real estate firm paid Andrau Airpark Inc., the airport's owners, 53 million dollars for the land. The tract went under contract to the Camden Property Trust. The airport was quickly demolished and the Royal Oaks Country Club subdivision and a golf course replaced the field.
