= West Oaks Mall (Houston) =

- Location: Alief, Houston, Texas, U.S.
- Coordinates: 29.73217°N 95.6483°W
- Address: 1000 West Oaks Mall
- Opened: 1984 (42 years ago)
- Closed: August 2024 (indoor only) (anchor is still open)
- Developer: JMB Realty
- Manager: PRCP Management
- Owner: Mehta Investments, Ltd
- Num. of stores: 6
- Num. of anchor tenants: 7 (4 open, 3 vacant)
- Floor area: 1,100,000 sq ft (100,000 m^{2})
- Floors: 1 (2 in anchors)
- Public transit: METRO Routes 75 & 82
- Website: www.shopwestoaksmall.com, Archived June, 2016

West Oaks Mall is a regional shopping mall located in the Alief area of the west side of Houston, Texas, United States, that opened in 1984. It has now been boarded up and shutdown. With a trade area serving far western parts of Houston including a business clientele in the Energy Corridor and suburban neighborhoods west of George Bush Park in the Greater Katy and Fulshear areas, the mall is located at Texas State Highway 6 and Westheimer Road and can easily be accessed south on Highway 6 via Interstate 10.

The anchors are Dillard's Clearance Center, Crazy Boss, The Outlet at West Oaks, and Fortis College. There are 2 vacant anchors, formerly housing Sears and Toby Keith's I Love This Bar & Grill. Pacific Retail Capital Partners owned the mall as a joint venture with Square Mile Capital Management, and was managed by PRCP Management. In 2017, it was sold to Mehta Investments, Ltd.

== History ==
=== Early years (1984-1996) ===
West Oaks Mall has its roots in the opening of a branch of Houston-based department store chain Foley's in 1982 – two years before the mall opened. In the foyer of the north entrance to the store, on both walls, there are handprints of children on terra-cotta tiles with a plaque dated May 22, 1982. The mall itself opened in 1984 with a single-level floorplan designed in a "Mission style", and replete with earth tone interiors, numerous fountains and skylights. Originally, the mall targeted higher-end consumers on Houston's western fringes and surrounding suburban areas, with anchor tenants Foley's, Saks Fifth Avenue, Lord & Taylor, and Mervyn's, along with over 120 inline stores, a six-screen Plitt Theatres (later Cineplex Odeon) cinema, and a food court dubbed the "Fiesta Food Court". West Oaks served as a direct competitor to nearby Town & Country Mall and Memorial City Mall in Houston's Memorial area – targeting shoppers in Houston's Energy Corridor and the Greater Katy area, as well as a newer alternative for shoppers in rapidly growing Fort Bend County who otherwise would have gone to Sharpstown Mall or Westwood Mall.

In 1985, Macy's announced that it was building a fifth Houston store at West Oaks Mall, which would have been located on the mall's last remaining anchor pad directly opposite Lord & Taylor and would have opened in late 1987, a year after the flagship Houston Galleria store (later dubbed "Macy's at Sage" after the 2006 merger) opened. The proposed Macy's ultimately never materialized. As Houston's economy suffered in the aftermath of the 1980s oil glut, demand for upscale retail declined sharply and by the spring of 1990, Saks Fifth Avenue and Lord & Taylor closed their West Oaks locations, replaced respectively by Sears and JCPenney (both stores of which would fill a large gap in Greater Houston) as part of a repositioning of the mall as a mainstream middle-class suburban regional mall. Macy's intended space at West Oaks would eventually be filled by Dillard's in 1991, making it the first such store in Houston to be built as a Dillard's (the rest having been converted from the former Joske's in 1988). By the early 1990s, West Oaks emerged as one of Houston's top performing regional malls, in large part due to the decline of Town & Country and rapid suburban growth in the aforementioned areas.

=== 1996-2003 ===
The mall would receive its first serious challenge in 1996 when First Colony Mall opened in nearby Sugar Land. Though First Colony's opening had done more economic damage to the Sharpstown and Westwood malls in Southwest Houston (the latter of which would close over one year later), the new mall drew away many of West Oaks' customers from rapidly growing Fort Bend County, but still continued to draw some shoppers from this area due to the presence of stores that did not have locations at the new mall including Sears and some specialty stores which did not open locations at First Colony Mall. To compete with First Colony, West Oaks underwent a renovation that removed several features including a tall clock at the intersection of the Arcade and the Dillard's/JCPenney concourse, an elevated seating area in the food court used as a smoking area, all of the mall's fountains, and the original dark brown tile in the mall's inline corridor. In July 2003, Somera Investment Partners and Coastwood Capital Group purchased the mall from an affiliate of CB Richard Ellis Investors. That same year, the first Alamo Drafthouse in Houston opened in the mall after Alamo Drafthouse's Austin-based owners granted the franchise location in the former Cineplex Odeon cinema.

=== Since 2004 ===
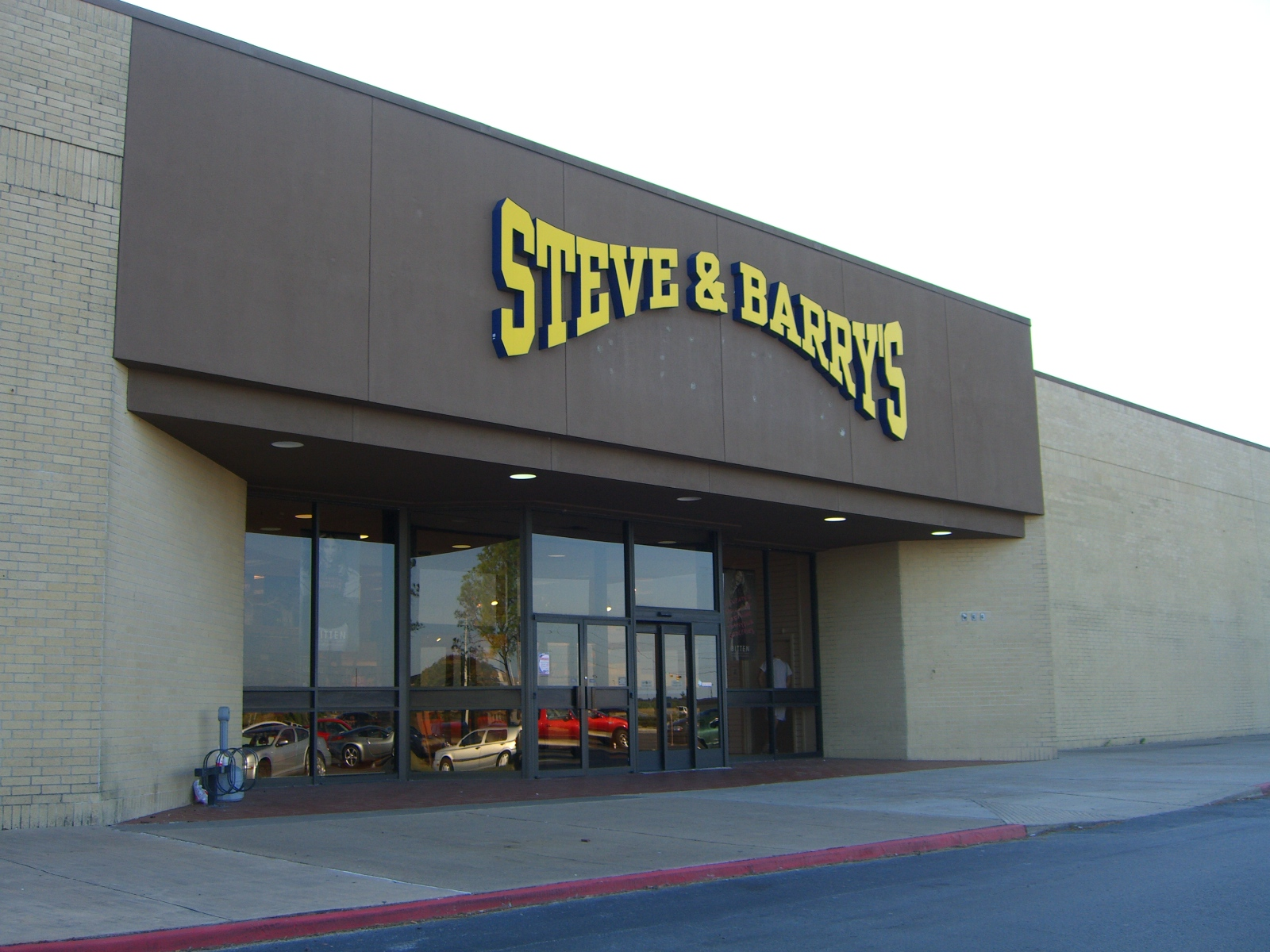
Steve & Barry's store (now demolished)

In 2004, the mall was renovated at a cost of ~$9.3 million in a "Texas ranch style" to compete with recent renovations at the Galleria and Memorial City Mall, as well as the impending expansion of First Colony Mall (which completed in 2006).The interior was extensively renovated, including the filling of the sunken part of the Park Court with concrete and the addition of a fireplace to the food court, and replacement of the tile from the 1996 renovation with marble, and the mall would be sold again in 2005 to Investment Properties of America, which bought the mall from the Somera/Coastwood partnership.

By this time, West Oaks faced increasingly stiff competition from Katy Mills which opened in 1999 with a lineup of outlet retail and entertainment options, as well as from a resurgent Memorial City Mall that completed a multimillion-dollar renovation in 2002. Both malls effectively lured shoppers from the rapidly growing and prosperous Greater Katy area away, with Memorial City's resurgence also hastening the decline of Town & Country Mall which closed in 2004 and would be redeveloped as CityCentre. The openings of the CityCentre and LaCenterra lifestyle centers in the Memorial area of Houston and Cinco Ranch, respectively, also further contributed to the mall's decline in prominence.

In 2009, the property's value was in steep decline. Pacific Retail Capital Partners bought the mall from LNR Partners Inc. for $15 million – $87 million less than it did when it was sold four years earlier. In 2011, Regal Entertainment Group agreed to open a 14-screen Edwards Theatres multiplex as a new anchor for the mall, replacing the Alamo Drafthouse cinema which continued to operate until the completion of construction on the Edwards multiplex that resulted in the demolition of much of the former Mervyn's wing, which was briefly anchored by Steve & Barry's before the latter chain went bankrupt in 2009. Other anchor changes during this time included Fortis College filling the former JCPenney anchor space (which closed in 2005) and Dillard's converting its store to a clearance center only utilizing the first floor in 2010. Palais Royal opened one of the anchor slots in November of 2011 and closed it along with the rest of the chain on September 5, 2020.

On January 4, 2017, Macy's announced it would close its West Oaks Mall store after 35 years. The store closed on March 27, 2017. On January 4, 2018, Sears announced it would close its West Oaks Mall store after 28 years. The off-site Auto Center closed in late-January 2018 and the store closed in early-April 2018. In May–June 2018, The Outlet moved in to fill the former Macy's location. The Palais Royale location closed in 2019.

The West Oaks Bed Bath and Beyond closed in 2020. In September of 2022, Regal closed at the mall due to Cineworld's bankruptcy. By June of 2023, only Dillard's Clearance Center, The Outlet, Fortis College, Crazy Boss and two inline tenants remained open with the majority of interior corridors closed to the public. On September 25, 2022, Edwards Stadium closed due to bankruptcy.

As of August 2024, the interior of the mall is boarded off, with only Dillard's Clearance Center, The Outlet, Fortis College, and Crazy Boss remaining accessible.
