= PlazAmericas =

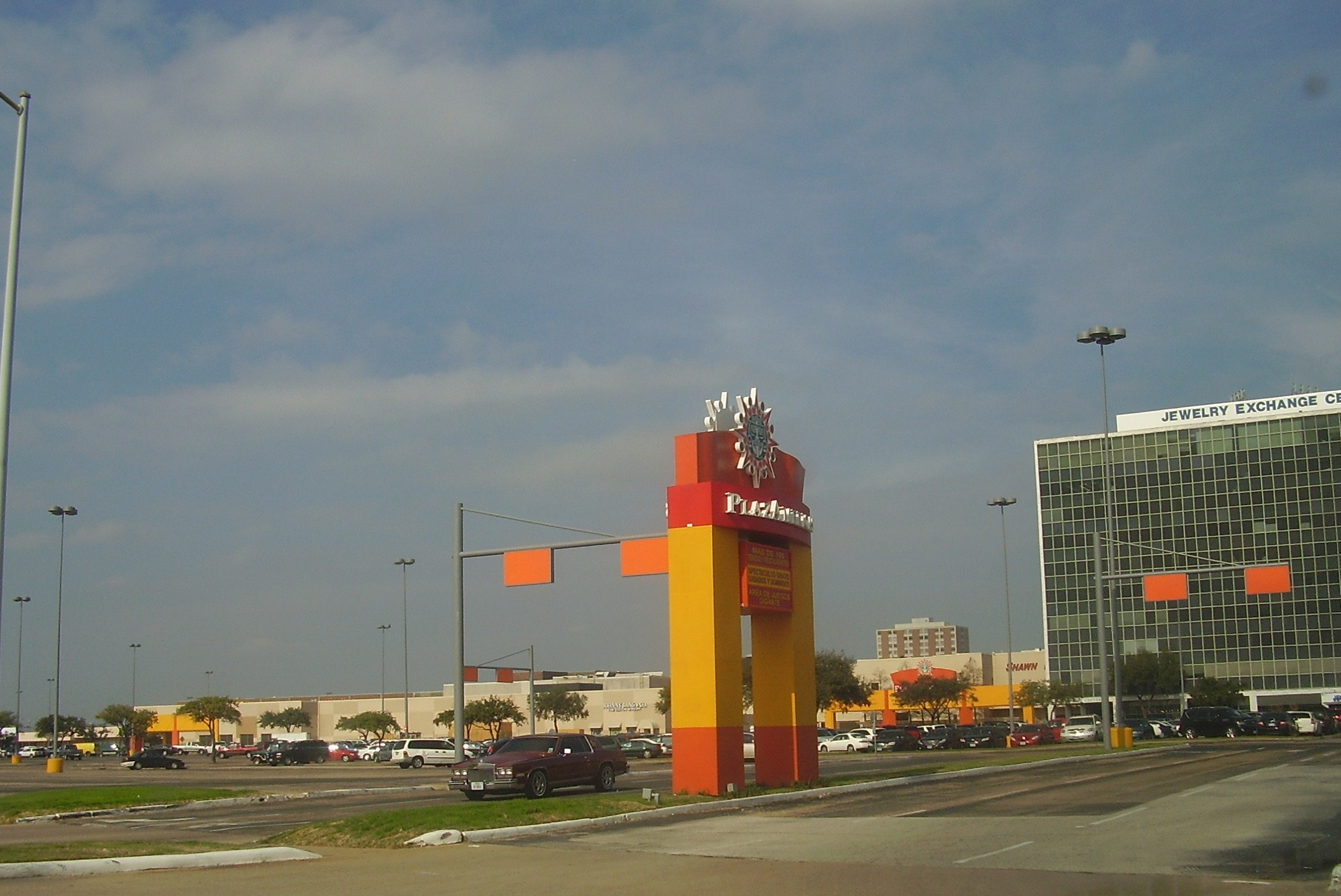
- View along Bellaire Boulevard
- Location: Sharpstown, Houston, Texas, United States
- Coordinates: 29°42′27″N 95°30′55″W
- Address: 201 Sharpstown Center
- Opened: September 14, 1961 (65 years ago)
- Developer: Frank Sharp
- Owner: Baker Katz Management
- Architect: Sidney H. Morris & Associates
- Num. of anchor tenants: 6
- Floors: 2 (3 in former Macy's)
- Public transit: METRO Routes 2, 9, 402/QL2 Quickline
- Website: www.plazamericas.com

PlazAmericas, formerly known as Sharpstown Mall and earlier Sharpstown Center, is a shopping mall located in the Sharpstown development in Greater Sharpstown, Houston, Texas. The mall is located on the northwest corner of Interstate 69/U.S. Route 59 and Bellaire Boulevard. This is the third mall to be built in Houston after Gulfgate Mall opened in 1956 and Meyerland Plaza in 1957, but the first fully air-conditioned mall in Houston. The area includes the Jewelry Exchange Center, a ten-story building. After the mall was renamed PlazAmericas, it took a Latin American theme and catered to Hispanics. The anchor stores are Burlington, SuperNova Furniture, America Cinemas, La Sorella, Gold Factory & Imports, and Clarewood Supermercado.

It was built in Sharpstown Industrial Park Section 12.

== History ==
=== Beginnings and prime years (1961–1990s) ===
The mall opened as Sharpstown Center, on September 14, 1961, mere days after Hurricane Carla affected Houston, with future United States Senator Ted Kennedy appearing during the opening ceremony as the main speaker. A 1970 Houston Chronicle article stated that Frank Sharp decided not to delay the opening; therefore the morale of Houstonians would be increased. Not surprisingly, the first day of business brought only 8,000 shoppers (a number that was affected by the hurricane).

At the time of its opening, the mall consisted of 43 stores on one level including the first suburban branch of the Houston-based Foley's department store chain, as well as the first suburban locations of Houston Trunk Factory, Battelstein's and Florsheim Shoes. In addition to Foley's, Montgomery Ward also opened as an anchor, along with the Sharpstown State Bank—later shuttered in the wake of the Sharpstown scandal which significantly involved Sharpstown developer Frank Sharp and many members of the Texas Legislature. The former bank building would later become home to the Jewelry Exchange Center, with three "motor bank" drive-throughs in the middle of the front parking lot as the only present-day reminder of the former bank.

Early on, transportation concerns became a threat to the mall's success, and consequently Frank Sharp decided to donate a 300 ft (91 m) wide strip of land to build the Southwest Freeway (Interstate 69/U.S. Route 59) through his development. Because it was Houston's first air conditioned mall—a luxury given Houston's historically unpredictable weather, many Houston residents residing in the central part of the city wanted to experience the "mall of the future", hence the traffic concerns. Another unique aspect of the mall within its corridors was the Clock of Texas diorama, an animated look at the history of Texas through the centuries. Sharp would also place a time capsule in the cornerstone of the mall.

When Sharpstown Center opened, it was located on the edge of Houston's southwest suburbs. As the Houston area grew rapidly over the next three decades, with Houston itself becoming the nation's fourth-largest city, numerous other developments throughout southwest Houston began to emerge. These developments included countless new apartment complexes home to young professionals in Houston's energy industry, residential developments as far south as Missouri City, the construction of Houston Baptist University, Memorial Hermann Southwest Hospital, numerous car dealerships, and a new studio complex for the city's NBC television affiliate, KPRC-TV and its sister radio station KPRC-AM. By 1970, Sharpstown Center had 57 stores and was fully leased.

The 1970s also saw the opening of The Galleria and Westwood Mall, which became Sharpstown's two strongest competitors over the next two decades. While the Galleria was unique in its strong focus on upscale retailers such as Neiman Marcus, Westwood was a more direct competitor to Sharpstown with anchor stores Joske's and Sears, which complemented Sharpstown's aforementioned anchors, and a closer location to rapidly growing Fort Bend County, home to a growing base of upper-middle class suburban shoppers. Beginning in 1979, construction of a second floor began (effectively doubling the mall's store count to over 200) and the mall was extensively renovated from its original 1950s appearance to better compete with Westwood Mall and the Galleria. The 15-month project concluded in May 1980 when the second floor opened to the public. Also during this time, a third anchor in JCPenney was added as well as a food court in the former Battelstein's department store. The mall was also re-branded as Sharpstown Mall, and would be referred to as such until reverting to the original name in 1993.

By February 1989, Sharpstown Mall was 97% occupied, making it the mall with the highest percentage of occupied space in the Houston area. In 1993, the mall underwent a $50 million renovation, with the largest addition being a new ten-screen Cineplex Odeon movie theater. The renovations effectively deterred Foley's from leaving for nearby Westwood Mall, which prior to the renovation was courting the department store as a third anchor following its own renovation in 1988. During this time, Sharpstown Mall also had to compete with West Oaks Mall for customers out of Fort Bend County.

=== Decline (1990s–2000s) ===
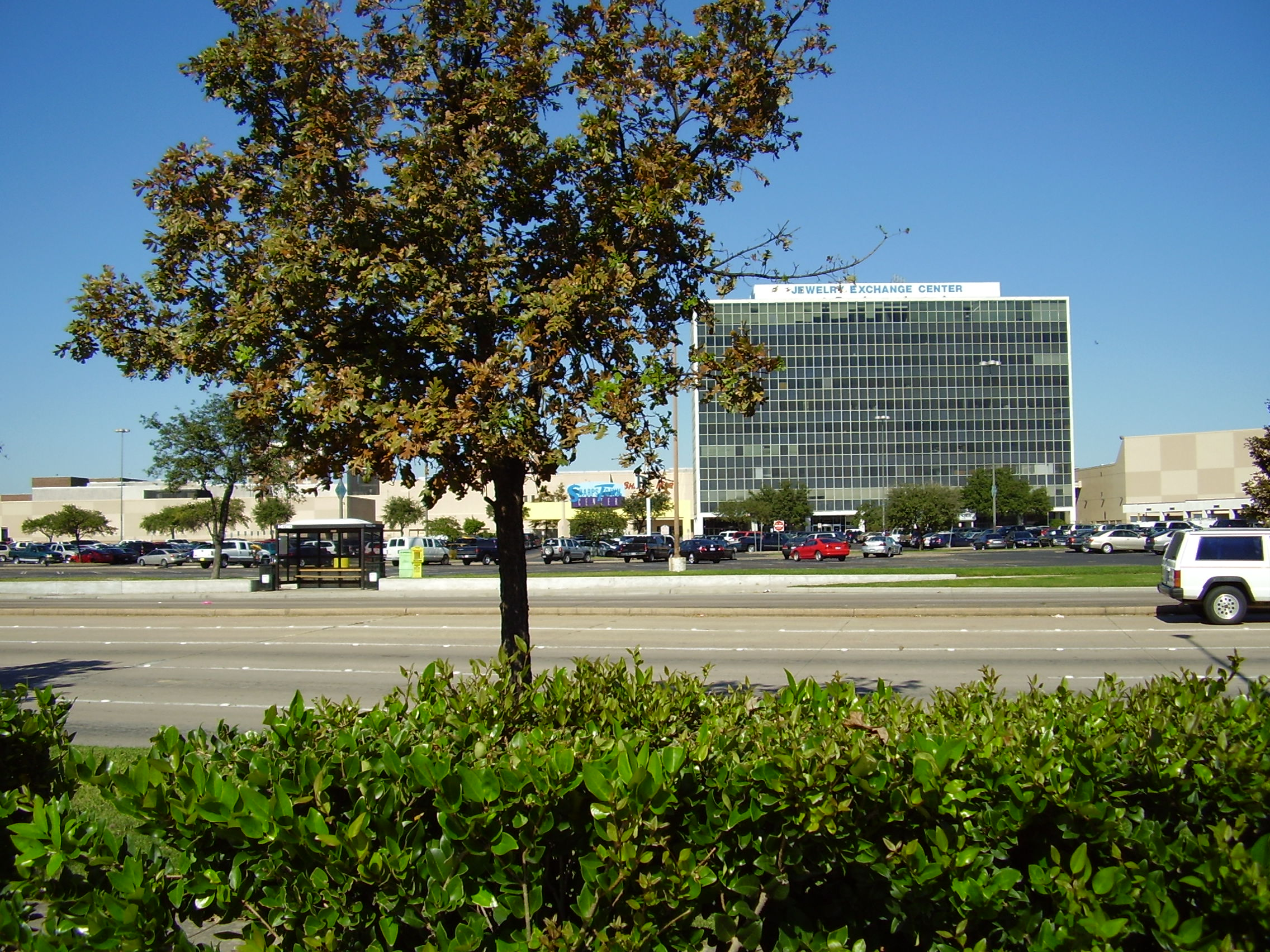
Sharpstown Center in 2006

Ralph Bivins and Greg Hassell of the Houston Chronicle said that the mall's decline began in the late 1980s. The mall's decline began as many of the nearby apartment complexes, once dominated by young professionals and single adults, became notorious as residential arrangements for low-income dwellers, which in turn resulted in an increase in criminal activity. This was accelerated by the 1980s oil glut which affected Houston's economy. Sam Wisialowski, president of the Y'alls Texas Store chain, stated that sales were declining annually by about 25 to 30 percent at its Sharpstown store when the chain decided to close said store in 1990. While Sharpstown managed to gain back some shoppers after the addition of the Cineplex Odeon movie theater, Sharpstown would suffer its most significant blow within the decade.

In 1996, First Colony Mall opened in the suburb of Sugar Land, which resulted in Sharpstown losing many of its national retailers and a core customer base in Fort Bend County that had long been critical to the mall's survival. Tom Estus, a shopping center broker of the Shelby/Estus Realty Group, said "It's a classic case of being passed up by newer, better malls. First Colony clipped it the hardest. The other places were more exciting to shop in. They were new. They were easier to get in and get out of." First Colony would also eventually seal the fate of Westwood Mall, which closed in 1998 and converted to a technology-focused office center, and eventually would impact West Oaks Mall as well. Finally, Sharpstown also had to compete with a redeveloped Meyerland Plaza, whose remodeled JCPenney location would serve as an anchor for the reborn shopping center. The aforementioned crime issues also continued to take their toll on Sharpstown Center, as the crime rate in the area surrounding the mall increased in the late 1990s and early 2000s due to white flight and urban decay.

Consequently, customers even within the surrounding area were deterred, and major retailers who desired a low crime, middle class, and wealthy area for profitable support began to leave. Oshman's Sporting Goods closed its store in 1997, around the same time it opened a store in the nearby suburb of Stafford to serve the Sugar Land area that once frequented Sharpstown for retail business. In 1998, JCPenney would close its store at Sharpstown, having lost much of its clientele to its First Colony store, with much of its remaining business going to its Meyerland Plaza store. In addition to the loss of businesses and customers to the Sugar Land area, further compounded by many big box retailers opening new locations in and around said area, such aforementioned big box stores as well as discounters including Walmart and Target have grown on the loyalties of customers who used to frequent shopping malls. Online shopping began and started to take away from mall shoppers as well. Shopping center developer Ed Wulfe, whose Wulfe & Co. redeveloped Meyerland Plaza as well as Gulfgate Mall, said that the loss of the major tenants negatively affected Sharpstown Center.

As 2000 dawned, a New York investment group named Sharpstown Center Associates owned the mall. By 2001, the mall was seized in a foreclosure, and Travelers Insurance took ownership of the mall, whose JCPenney anchor space remained vacant when it was announced that Montgomery Ward would close all its locations, including the Sharpstown store, as part of its liquidation process. The loss of Montgomery Ward would leave Foley's as the mall's only remaining anchor tenant, if not the only remaining original tenant from the mall's 1961 opening. Burlington Coat Factory would move from an adjacent shopping center to fill the former Montgomery Ward space.

In 2006 the Houston Press alternative weekly newspaper awarded Sharpstown Center "Best Hip-hop Mall," and Sharpstown began to bill itself as "Houston's Premiere Urban Mall" on its website. By May 2007, Sharpstown was nearly 75% occupied, mostly local tenants which now dominated the mall's retail base. Further cementing its status amongst its newfound "urban" clientele, on October 20, 2007, local hip hop radio station KPTY, owned by Univision (whose studio complex is located near the Galleria), opened a broadcast studio called Studio 104.9 where the station broadcast on a regular basis.

On December 28, 2007, Macy's announced that it would close its location in Sharpstown, the last remaining original anchor from the mall's 1961 opening. After the conclusion of its liquidation sale on March 15, 2008, employees were moved to other Macy's stores. Mere days after the Macy's announcement, on January 9, 2008, Finger Furniture announced that it would also be closing its Sharpstown location. By January 11, 2008, Sharpstown was operating under Chapter 11 bankruptcy protection and was up for sale. The then owner of the mall, Urban Mall Houston, was over $53 million in debt.

=== Renaming to PlazAmericas (2010–present) ===
In 2009, with the mall under the ownership of Philadelphia-based RAIT Financial Trust, the manager of the mall's interior core, Boxer Property, announced that the mall would be renamed "PlazAmericas." Chris Chumley, a spokesperson for PlazAmericas, stated that "Anybody who knows the back story to the mall knows that it's been distressed for a number of years." Chumley also stated that the mall would cater to the Hispanic population (which now constituted 52% of the population of the mall's three-mile trade area), would undergo a $10 million renovation to boost its appeal to Hispanic shoppers, and would have 350 stores by the time renovations were completed. The property would include an 83,000 square feet (7,700 m^{2}) "mercado" (marketplace) that would have many smaller businesses, a large family lounge, live entertainment stages, and a children's play area. The redevelopment into PlazAmericas was expected to create 500 jobs. Signs indicating the renaming appeared by January 29, 2010. But on December 21, 2018, Houston-based Baker Katz LLC, would purchase the main portion of the mall, as the anchors have different owners.

== Current Status of Anchor Sites ==
- Burlington Coat Factory (181,477 square feet, opened in former Montgomery Ward 2002)
- "Latino City Jewelry Market" (177,229 square feet, first opened as JCPenney in 1981. Closed 1998, and reopened in 2010 as a marketplace, with shops, grocery store, laundromat as Clarewood Mercado, was renamed around 2016.)
- Vacant (360,846 square feet, opened as Foley's in 1961, became Macy's 2006, closed March 15, 2008)
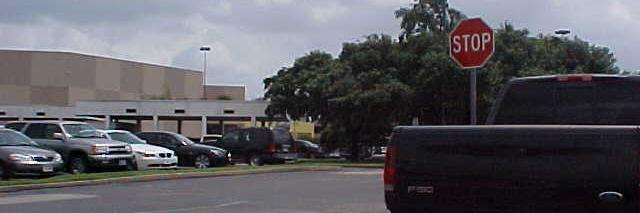
The remains of the bank are three drive-throughs in the middle of the front parking lot that are still standing to this day.

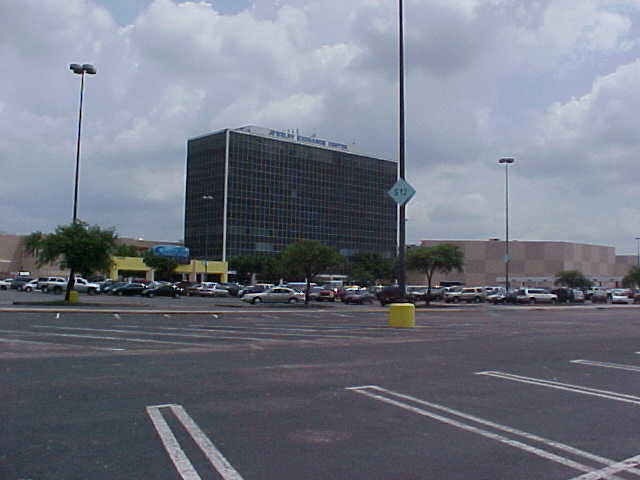
Jewelry Exchange Center
