= New Territory, Sugar Land, Texas =

New Territory, Texas
- Neighborhood of Sugar Land, Texas; Former Census-designated place
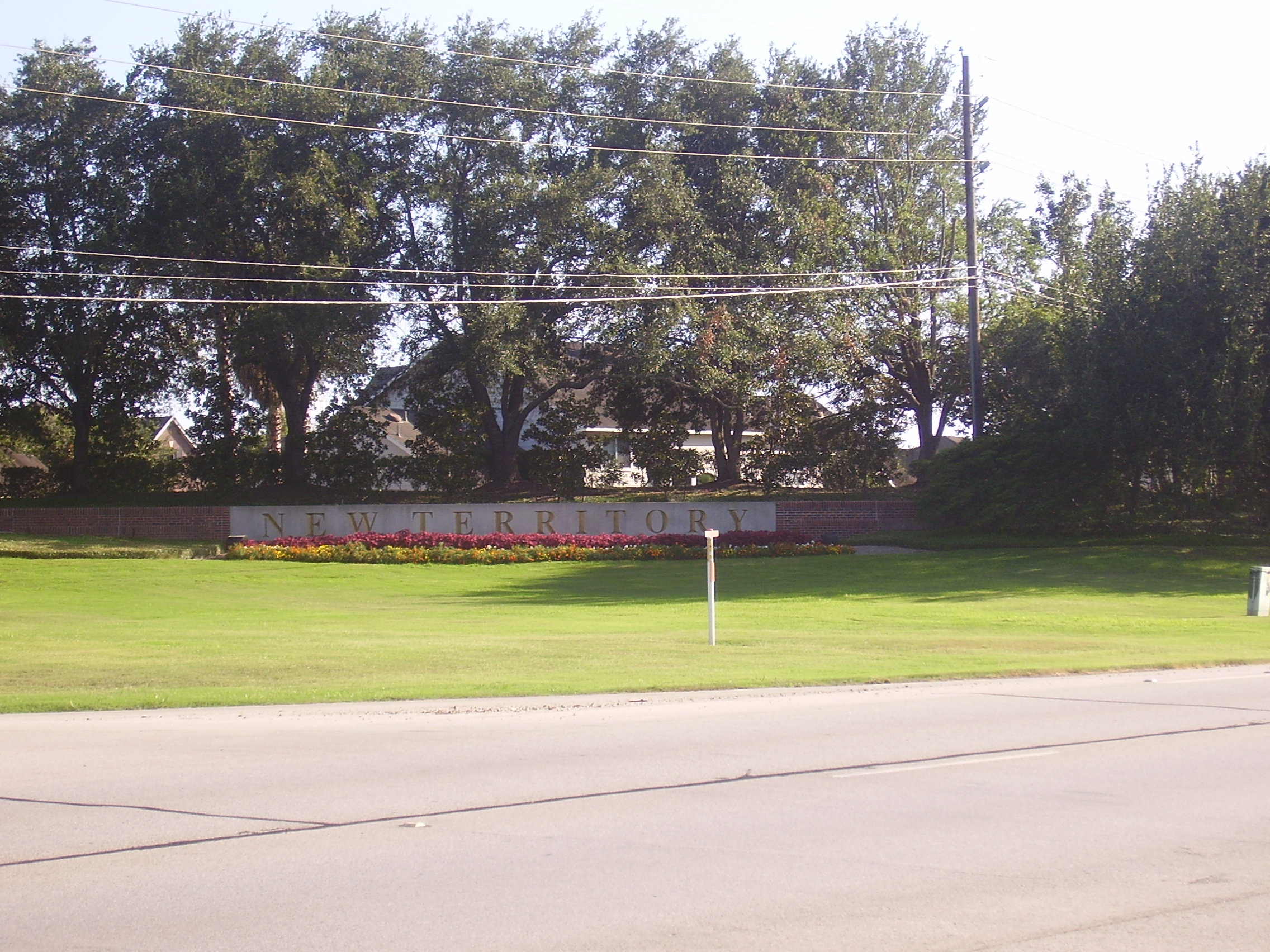

- Coordinates: 29°35′41″N 95°40′39″W
- Country: United States
- State: Texas
- County: Fort Bend

Area
  - Total: 4.78 sq mi (12.38 km^{2})
  - Land: 4.64 sq mi (12.01 km^{2})
  - Water: 0.14 sq mi (0.37 km^{2})
- Elevation: 75 ft (23 m)

Population (2010)
  - Total: 15,186
  - Density: 3,270/sq mi (1,264/km^{2})
- Time zone: UTC-6 (Central (CST))
  - Summer (DST): UTC-5 (CDT)
- FIPS code: 48-51366
- GNIS feature ID: 1852742

New Territory is a master-planned community within the city of Sugar Land, Texas, United States. It was formerly a census-designated place (CDP) and in the extraterritorial jurisdiction of Sugar Land, in unincorporated Fort Bend County. It was annexed into Sugar Land on December 12, 2017. The population was 15,186 at the 2010 census, up from 13,861 at the 2000 census.

== History ==
New Territory opened in 1989. In November 2016 the Sugar Land city council voted in favor of the city annexing New Territory, along with Greatwood, by the end of 2017. The annexation was effective December 12, 2017.

== Geography ==
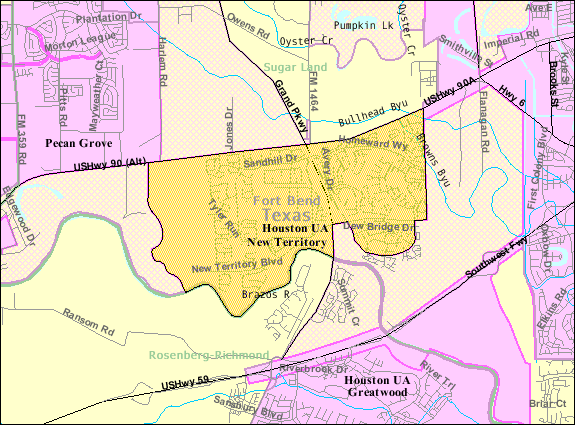
Map of the New Territory census-designated place, pre-annexation

New Territory is located in eastern Fort Bend County at 29°35′41″N 95°40′39″W (29.594657, -95.677561). It is bordered to the east and south by the city limits of Sugar Land. The Brazos River forms part of the southern boundary of the CDP. U.S. Route 90 forms the northern edge of the CDP.

According to the United States Census Bureau, the New Territory CDP has a total area of 4.8 square miles (12.4 km^{2}), of which 4.6 square miles (12.0 km^{2}) is land and 0.2 square miles (0.4 km^{2}), or 2.96%, is water.

== Demographics ==
As of the census of 2000, there were 13,861 people, 3,708 households, and 3,422 families residing in the CDP. The population density was 2,746.1 person per square mile (1,059.8/km^{2}). There were 3,805 housing units at an average density of 753.8 per square mile (291.0/km^{2}). The racial makeup of the CDP was 57.56% White, 10.02% African American, 0.22% Native American, 26.07% Asian, 0.04% Pacific Islander, 3.14% from other races, and 2.94% from two or more races. Hispanic or Latino of any race were 8.35% of the population.

There were 3,708 households, out of which 67.6% had children under the age of 18 living with them, 85.9% were married couples living together, 4.3% had a female householder with no husband present, and 7.7% were non-families. 6.5% of all households were made up of individuals, and 0.6% had someone living alone who was 65 years of age or older. The average household size was 3.47 and the average family size was 3.63.

In the CDP, the population was spread out, with 34.8% under the age of 18, 7.1% from 18 to 24, 39.3% from 25 to 44, 16.3% from 45 to 64, and 2.5% who were 65 years of age or older. The median age was 31 years. For every 100 females, there were 117.0 males. For every 100 females age 18 and over, there were 120.8 males.

The median income for a household in the CDP was $93,972, and the median income for a family was $96,863. Males had a median income of $71,250 versus $46,537 for females. The per capita income for the CDP was $29,341. About 1.3% of families and 2.0% of the population were below the poverty line, including 2.1% of those under age 18 and none of those age 65 o

== Culture ==
New Territory has a club with a gymnasium and an exercise room.

A large portion of the independent comedy The Legend of Action Man was shot in and around New Territory. It was where the creators of Dingoman productions (Andy Young, Derek Papa & James McEnelly) lived and met before they formed the sketch group and made their feature film.

== Government and infrastructure ==
Fort Bend County does not have a hospital district. OakBend Medical Center serves as the county's charity hospital which the county contracts with.

== Education ==
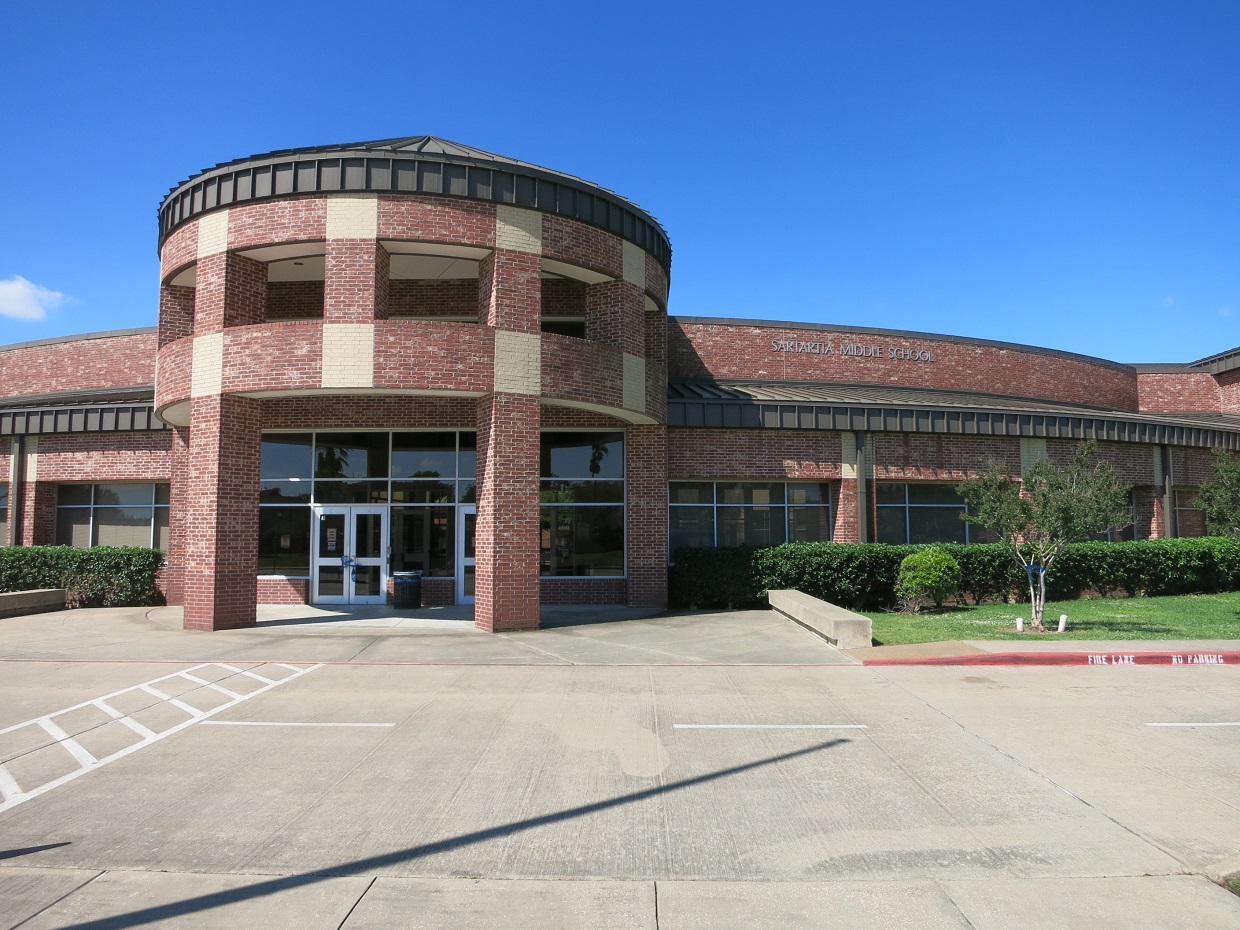
Sartartia Middle School

New Territory is within the Fort Bend Independent School District. The community is within the West Division, controlling school board slots 1 through 3.

Some of New Territory is zoned to Walker Station Elementary School, and some is zoned to Brazos Bend Elementary School.

All of New Territory is zoned to Sartartia Middle School.

Prior to 2001, Garcia Middle School served all of New Territory.

Some of New Territory is zoned to Austin High School, other parts are zoned to Travis High School. Prior to 2006 all territory was zoned to Austin; in the fall of that year Travis opened. At the time of the rezoning, the present 11th and 12th graders remained at Austin, while 9th and 10th graders were immediately rezoned; the Travis zoning was phased in each year.

The Texas Legislature designated Wharton County Junior College as the college for the city and extraterritorial jurisdiction of Sugar Land.

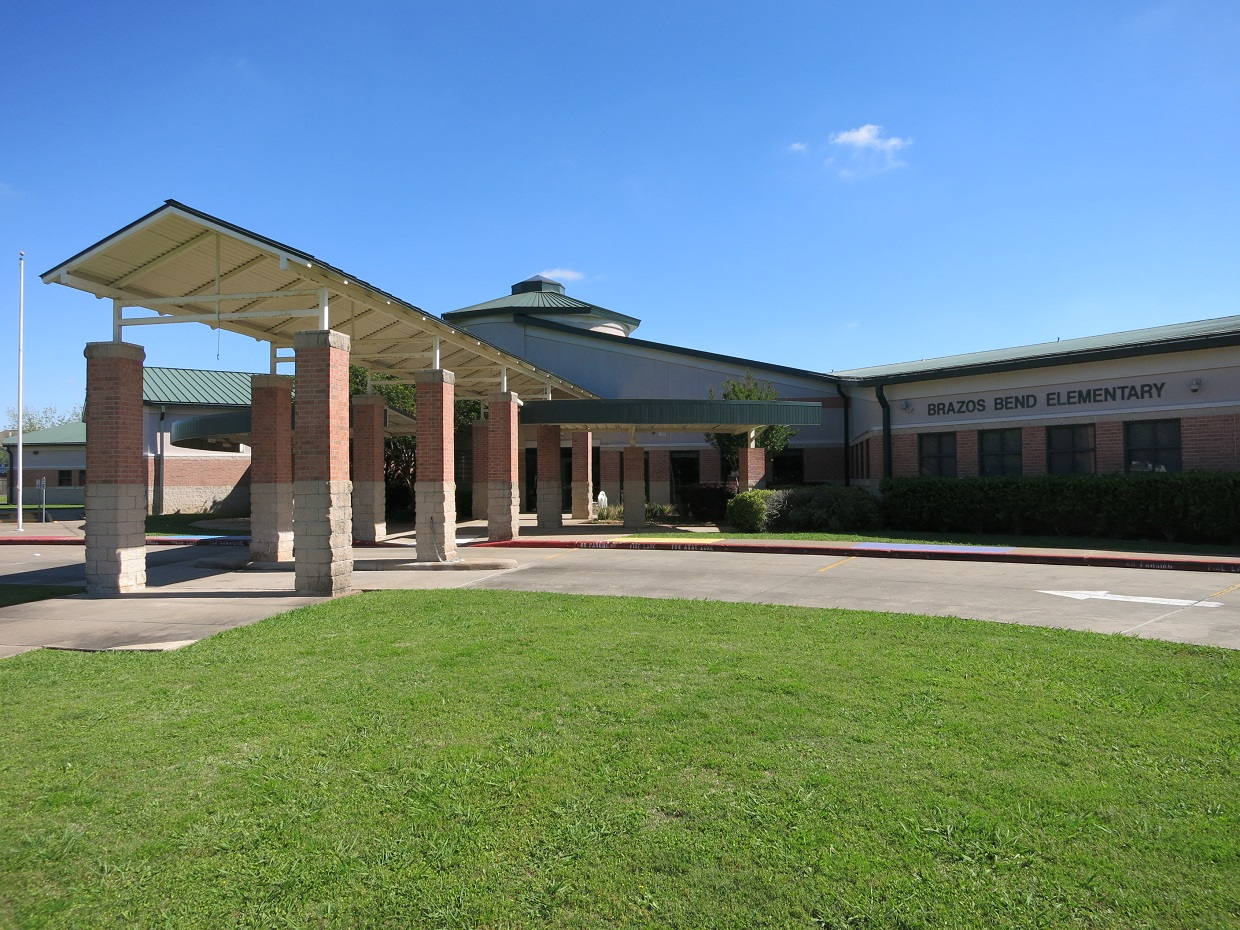
Brazos Bend Elementary School

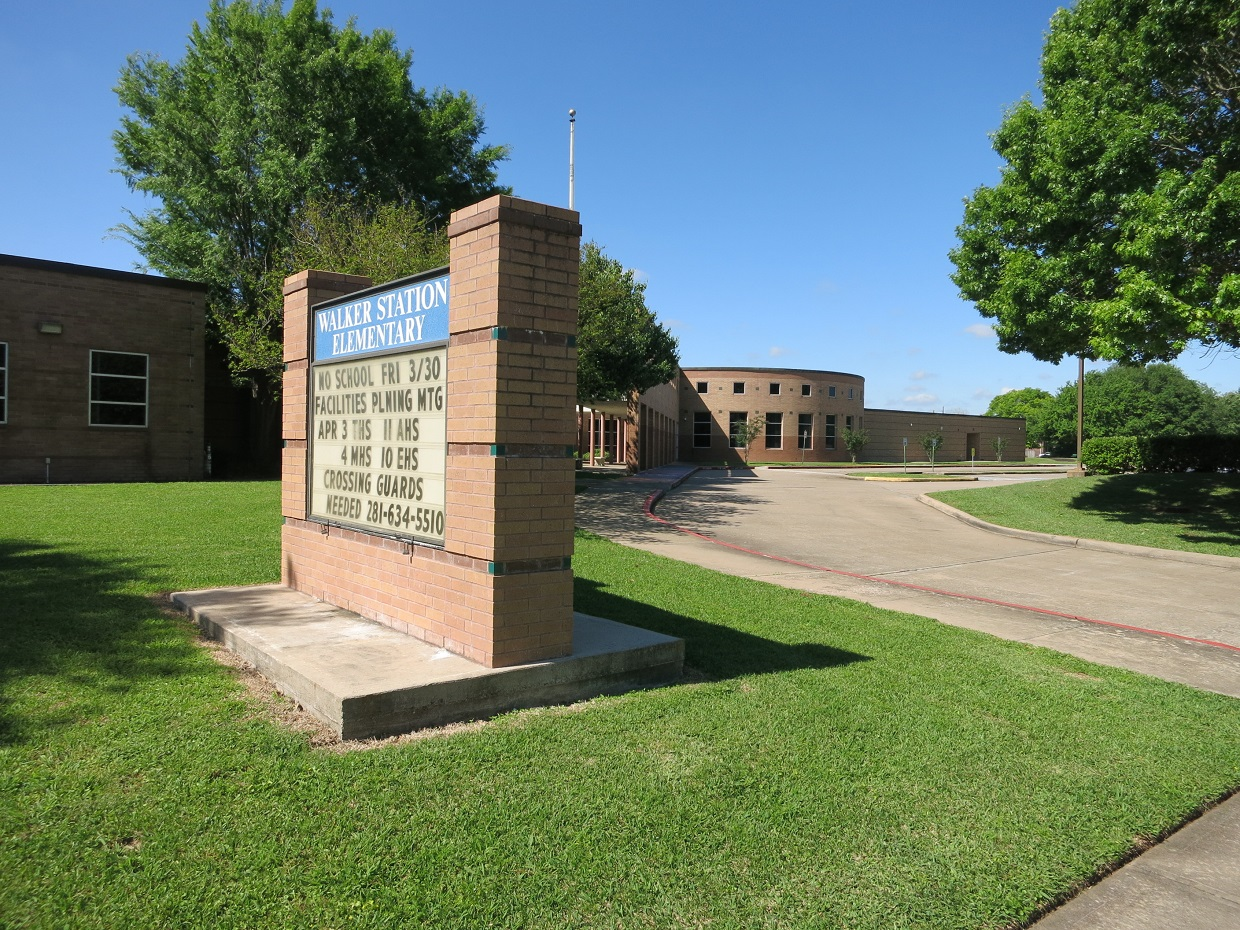
Walker Station Elementary School
