= Southwest Management District =

District in Houston, Texas

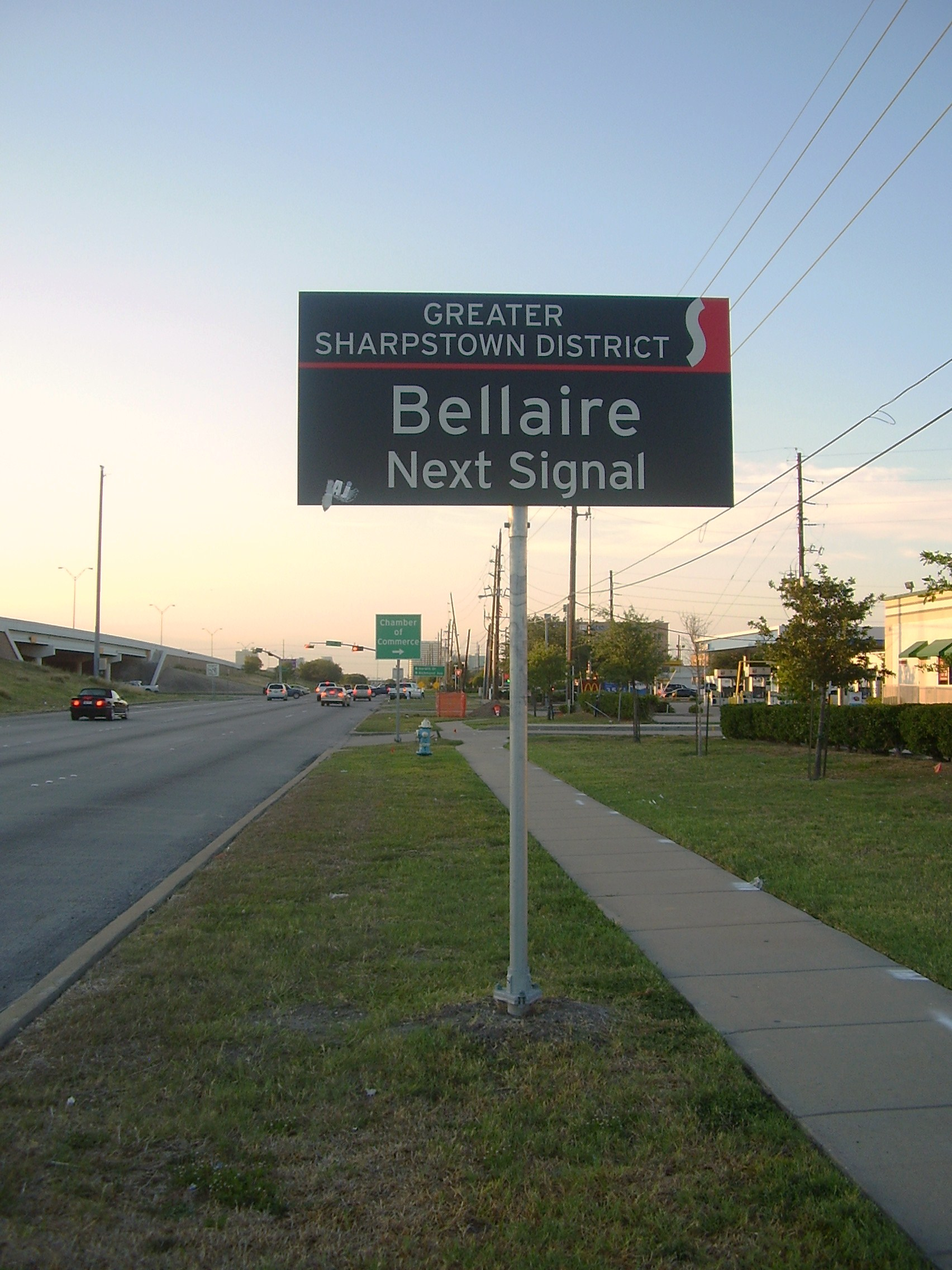
Sign stating that Bellaire Boulevard is ahead

Southwest Management District, formerly Greater Sharpstown Management District, is a district in Houston, Texas, United States. The district is split into 6 neighborhoods: Sharpstown, Chinatown, Mahatma Gandhi District/Little India, Westwood, Harwin, and University.

It is governed by a management district which is created by the Texas Legislature.

== History ==
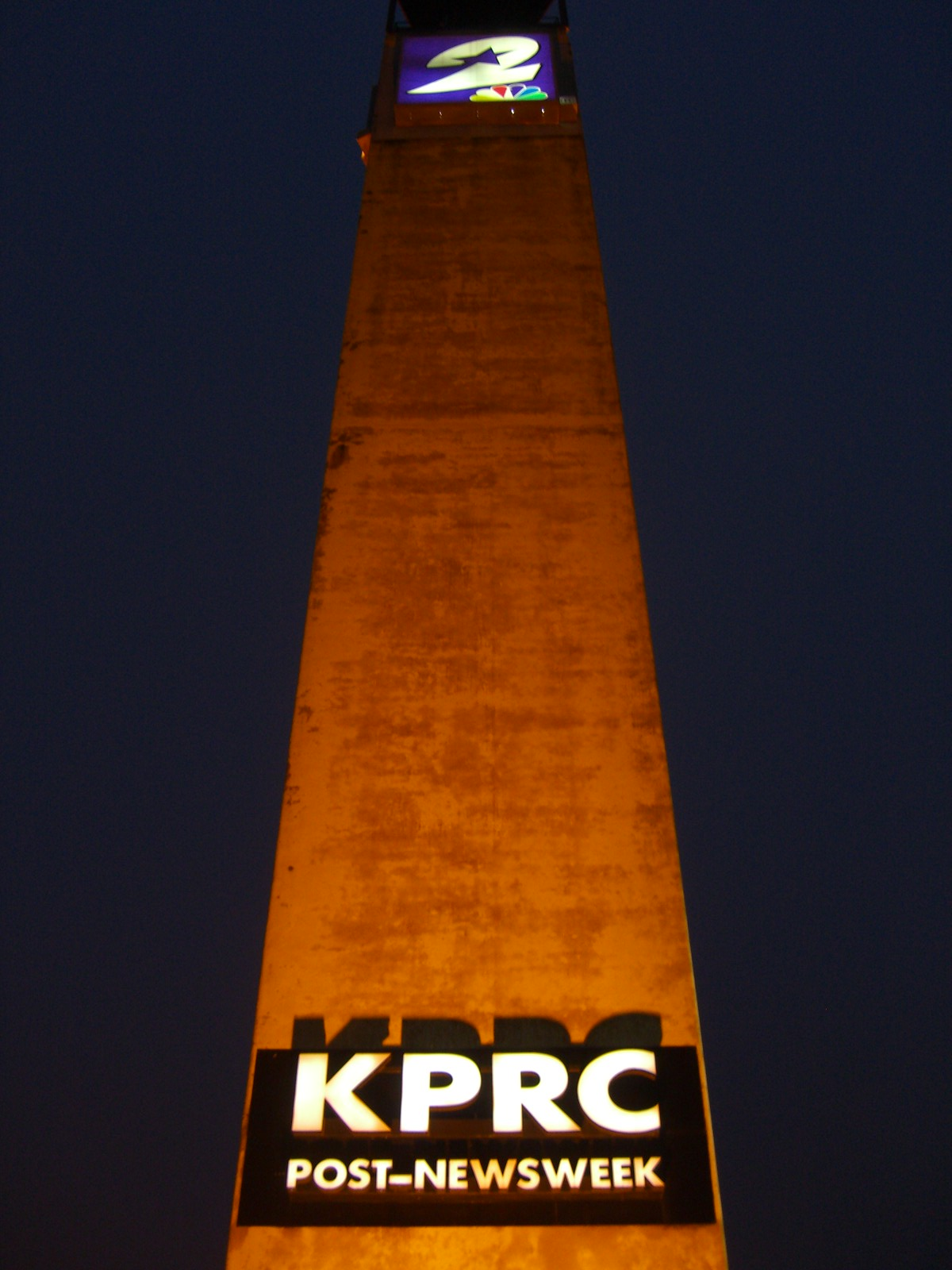
KPRC-TV STL tower off of Interstate 69/U.S. Route 59 in Greater Sharpstown

Construction of the Sharpstown community, the namesake of the district, began circa 1955. The Texas Legislature approved the formation of the Greater Sharpstown Management District in 2005.

On August 20, 2000, Houston METRO provided its first 24-hour bus service from Downtown to Sharpstown Center. However, due to financial difficulties in building light rail, they had to discontinue the 1:35 am, 2:35 am, and 3:33 am eastbound trips. The last trip from Downtown would leave at 1:05 am, and the First trip at Harwin and Reims would start at 4:00 am Effective January 26, 2003. They have not brought back 24 hour service since then.

After Hurricane Katrina struck New Orleans, Louisiana, the zip code 77036 received the largest concentration of Katrina evacuees of any area in the city. 5,991 Katrina evacuees moved into over 2,600 apartment units. Within a wider area, from the 610 Loop to the Houston city limits and from Westpark Drive to U.S. Highway 90A (South Main), 23,000 Katrina evacuees settled there.

On May 31, 2013, the Houston Fire Department suffered its largest casualty in a single event, the Southwest Inn fire, with four firefighters killed and 13 others were injured while fighting a 5-alarm fire at Southwest Inn, located in Greater Sharpstown.

== Cityscape ==
The district consists of around 10 square miles (26 km^{2}) of land, bounded by the Westpark Tollway to the north, Interstate 69/U.S. Route 59 and Bissonnet to the south, Beltway 8 to the west, and Hillcroft to the east. I-69/U.S. 59, the Westpark Tollway, and Beltway 8 are the main transit arteries. The main commercial arteries of the district are Bellaire Boulevard and Interstate 69/U.S. Route 59. The management district government estimates that the district is 15 minutes driving time from Downtown Houston. The district has about 8,000 single-family houses and 7,000 condominiums and townhouses. Greater Sharpstown includes the Sharpstown subdivision, the portion of Chinatown inside Beltway 8, a portion of Forum Park, and other nearby subdivisions. The district is divided into several zones, including:

- Chinatown (the portion of Chinatown within Greater Sharpstown)
- Harwin
- Sharpstown
- South Asia
- University
- Westwood (Westwood Mall area)

In 2010 the district announced that it will implement new and distinctly designed street signage to mark the various zones within Greater Sharpstown (replacing the existing standard city of Houston signage); installation began in the late winter of 2011.

== Demographics ==
As of 2010 Greater Sharpstown has about 94,500 residents. Among the district residents are African Americans, Chinese Americans, Hispanic Americans, Vietnamese Americans. Up until the late 1980s White Americans were the majority. Many former residents left, going to First Colony, Missouri City, Pearland, Stafford, and Sugar Land as the City of Houston expanded.

== Economy ==
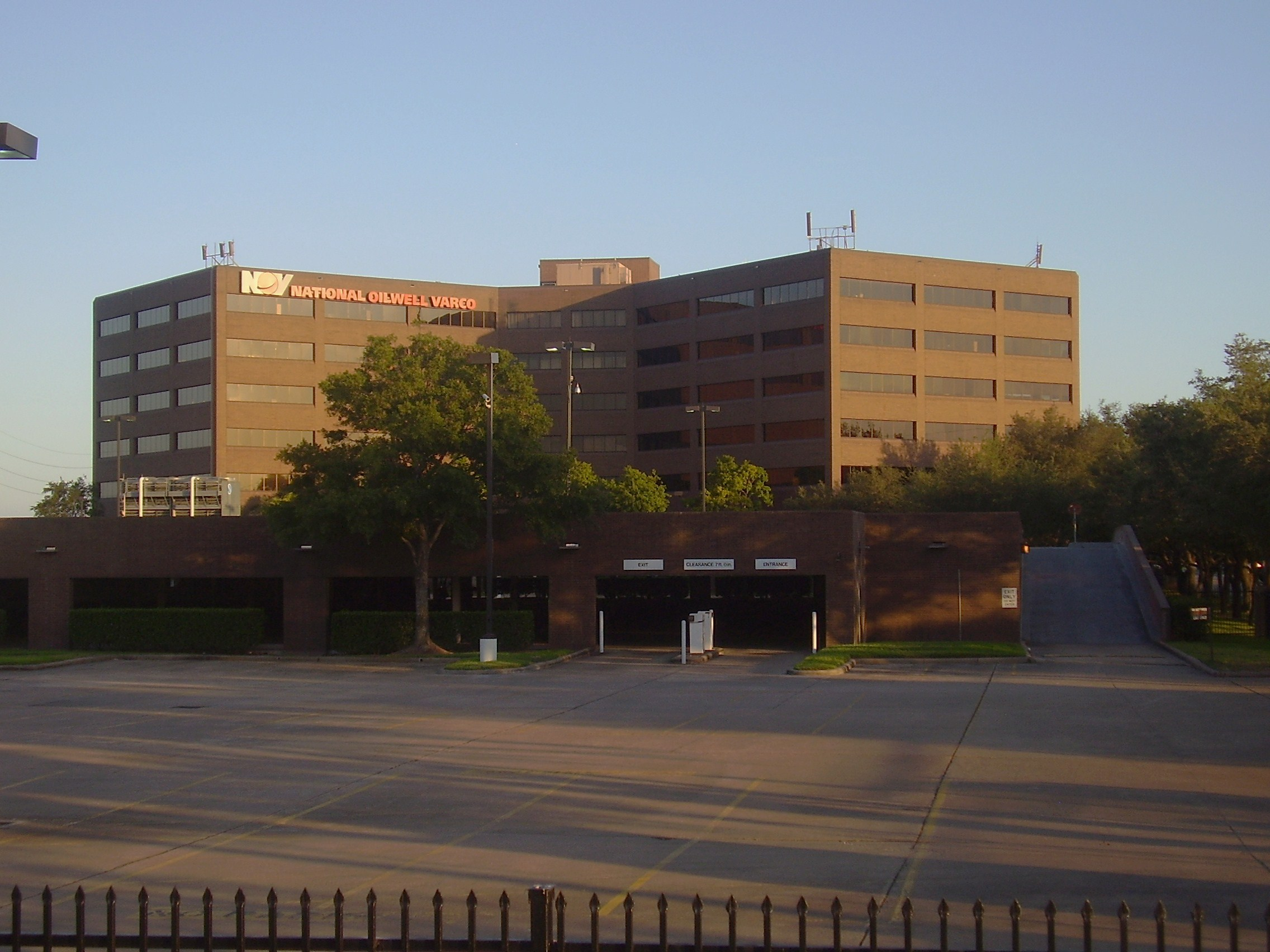
National Oilwell Varco headquarters

National Oilwell Varco has its headquarters in Greater Sharpstown. MetroCorp Bancshares and subsidiary MetroBank have their headquarters in Greater Sharpstown and in Chinatown. Southwestern National Bank also has its headquarters in Chinatown and Greater Sharpstown. La Subasta Inc. (formerly El Día, Inc.), which publishes La Subasta and which published El Día, has its offices in Greater Sharpstown.

KPRC-TV has its studios in Greater Sharpstown. The China Airlines Houston Mini Office (Chinese: 休士顿营业所, Pinyin: Xiūshìdùn Yíngyèsuǒ) is located in 2 Arena Place in the Arena Place complex in Greater Sharpstown.

Prior to its dissolution, A.D. Vision, an anime and manga company, was headquartered in Greater Sharpstown.

== Government ==
=== Management district ===
The district headquarters are located in Suite 109 at 9788 Clarewood Drive. The management district is governed by a board of directors, and board meetings are held once every month in the district headquarters.

=== Municipal government ===
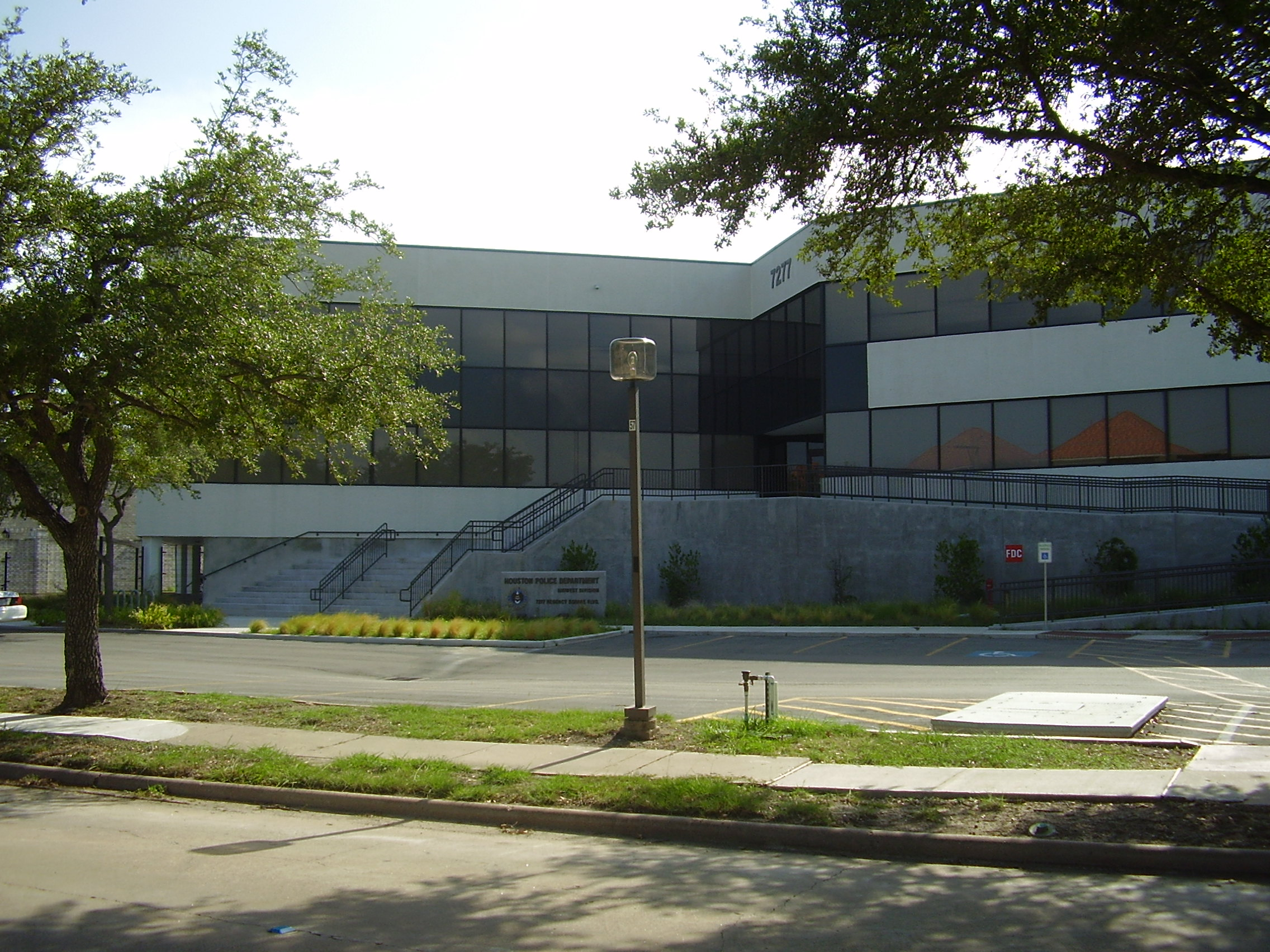
Mid-West Police Substation

Most of Greater Sharpstown is in Houston City Council District J. District J was created to allow Hispanics to more easily elect representatives who cater to them. Some of it is in city council district F.

The Houston Fire Department operates fire services in Greater Sharpstown, with the primary run area of Fire District 68 covering a lot of territory in Greater Sharpstown. Fire stations located within the district boundaries include Station 51 Sharpstown, a part of Fire District 68, and Station 10 Bellaire, a part of Fire District 83. Station 51 opened in 1962. Since then it had two facelifts and a renovation in the financial year of 1999. Station 10, previously located in what is now East Downtown, relocated to its current location in the new Chinatown and in Greater Sharpstown in 1985. Station 68 Braeburn Glen, adjacent to the district, opened in 1973.

The neighborhood is served by three Houston Police Department patrol divisions. Most areas north and west of U.S. Route 59 are served by the Midwest Patrol Division, while the far western portion of Greater Sharpstown is served by the Westside Patrol Division. Areas south and east of U.S. 59 are served by the Fondren Patrol Division. The portion that is now in the Midwest Patrol Division was formerly in the Westside Patrol Division. The Midwest division operates the Ranchester Storefront along Bellaire Boulevard in the new Chinatown and in Greater Sharpstown.

The Midwest Patrol Division headquarters are located in a 60,000-square-foot (5,600 m^{2}) building in the district. The city purchased the building, a former business college, in November 2007. The operations in the facility began on March 1, 2010. The process of the purchase and renovation was a two-year project. The official grand opening of the station was held on April 27, 2010. The station has 159 police officers and civilians assigned to the patrol division, one investigative first responder (IFR) squad, and two narcotics squads. The facility has available furnished space for two additional investigative squads and 20,000 square feet (1,900 m^{2}) of unfurnished space for future expansion. The building has a room which functions as a public meeting room and an in-service training room which seats up to 80 people. The facility has a gymnasium, a jail lockup for class C prisoners, down rooms for men and women, a break room, a kitchenette, full-sized lockers for the employees, an emergency generator, an ice machine, and hurricane supplies.

The City of Houston Health Department operates the Sharpstown Health Services clinic.

=== County government ===
Harris Health System (formerly Harris County Hospital District) designated Valbona Health Center (formerly People's Health Center) in Greater Sharpstown for ZIP code 77074. The nearest public hospital is Ben Taub General Hospital in the Texas Medical Center.

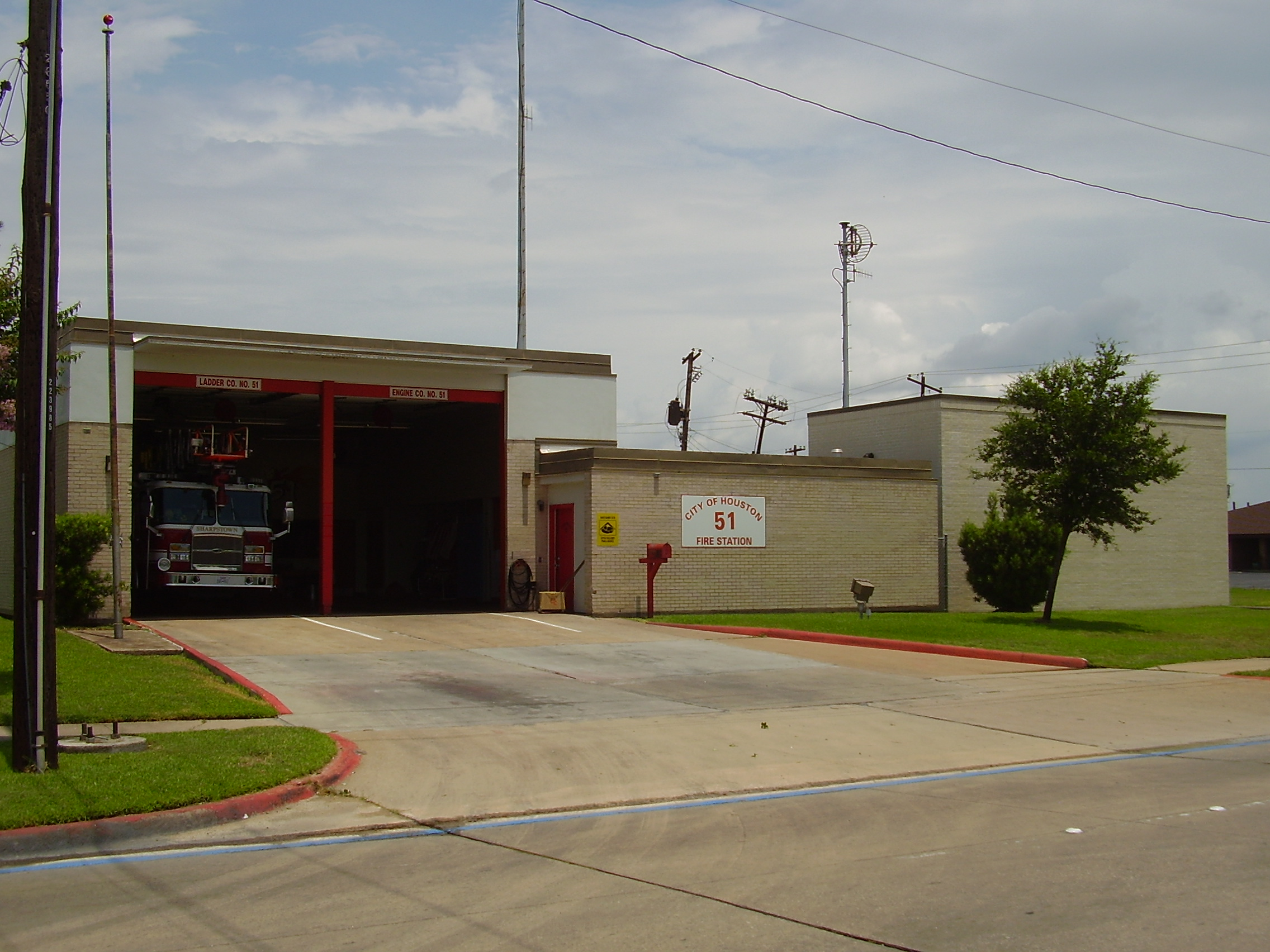
Fire Station 51 Sharpstown

=== State representation ===
The Texas Juvenile Justice Department (formerly of the Texas Youth Commission) Houston District Office is located in Greater Sharpstown.

== Culture ==
In 2007, the group Neighborhood Centers Inc. announced that it would build the Gulfton Neighborhood Campus at the intersection of Rookin Street and High Star Drive when it raises $20 million. The Baker-Ripley Neighborhood Center, the neighborhood center at the intersection in Greater Sharpstown, was scheduled to open in December 2009.

== Education ==
=== Primary and secondary schools ===
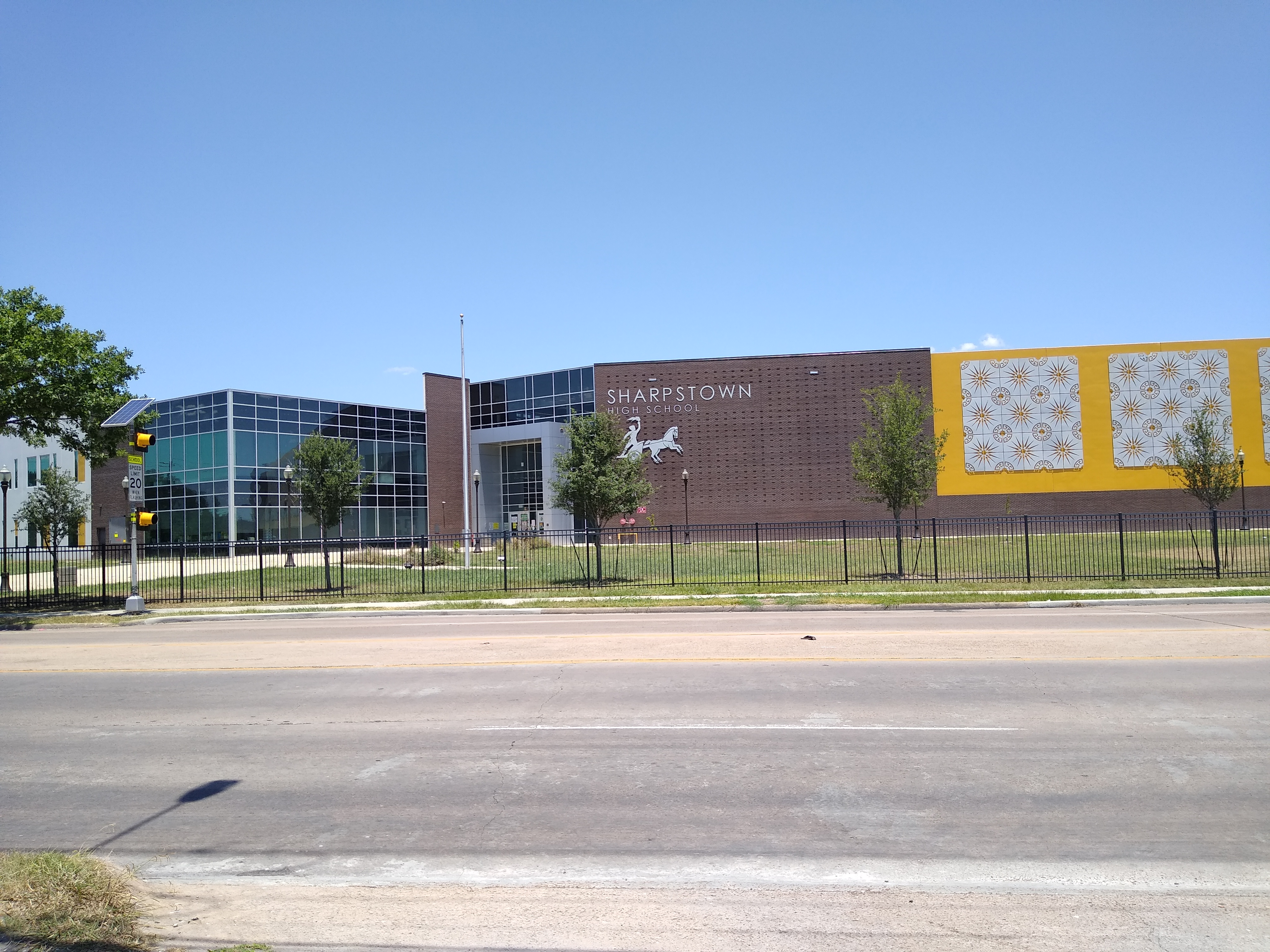
Sharpstown High School

About 73% of the area of Greater Sharpstown is in the Houston Independent School District (HISD), while the remaining 27% is within the Alief Independent School District (AISD).

The HISD section is served by multiple schools. Bonham, Neff, Sutton, and Ed White elementary schools are in the district. Secondary schools in that district in the SWMD are Sugar Grove Middle School, Jane Long Academy (6-12), Sharpstown High School, and Sharpstown International School (6-12). A portion of the district is zoned to Sharpstown High. A portion of the district is served by Margaret Long Wisdom High School (formerly Robert E. Lee High School) outside of the district. The Long campus houses the Las Américas Newcomer School. Sharpstown International is a magnet school. Liberty High School, an alternative high school for recent immigrants, was from 2017 on the campus of Sharpstown International. In 2022 it moved to the Houston Community College (HCC) Gulfton Campus.

There are three Alief ISD elementary schools in the district: Best, Audrey Judy Bush, and Collins. Chancellor, Gladys Birdwell Horn, Landis, and Sneed serve other sections of the district; Chancellor has no bilingual students, and the ones in the district go to Sneed instead. For intermediate school Alief Middle, Budweig, Klentzman, and Owens serve sections of the district; Alief Middle does not have bilingual students, and they go to Owens instead. Middle schools serving sections include Alief Middle, O'Donnell, and Olle. For senior high school Alief ISD residents are randomly assigned to Alief Elsik, Alief Hastings, or Alief Taylor high schools.

YES Prep Public Schools has its headquarters in Greater Sharpstown. In addition YES Prep operates YES Prep Gulfton (originally YES Prep Lee), YES Prep West, and YES Prep South at the Revolution Campus in Greater Sharpstown.

Harmony Public Schools also has its headquarters in Greater Sharpstown. In addition, it has Harmony Science Academy High School, which was ranked in the top ten schools in the Greater Houston area by Children at Risk, and the Harmony School of Innovation in Greater Sharpstown. Girls and Boys Preparatory Academy, a charter school, was in Greater Sharpstown.

Greater Sharpstown also has three private schools. St. Francis de Sales Catholic School (grades K-8), Strake Jesuit College Preparatory and Saint Agnes Academy, are located in Sharpstown.

Islamic Education Institute of Texas (IEIT) is headquartered in Southwest Management District.

=== Public libraries ===
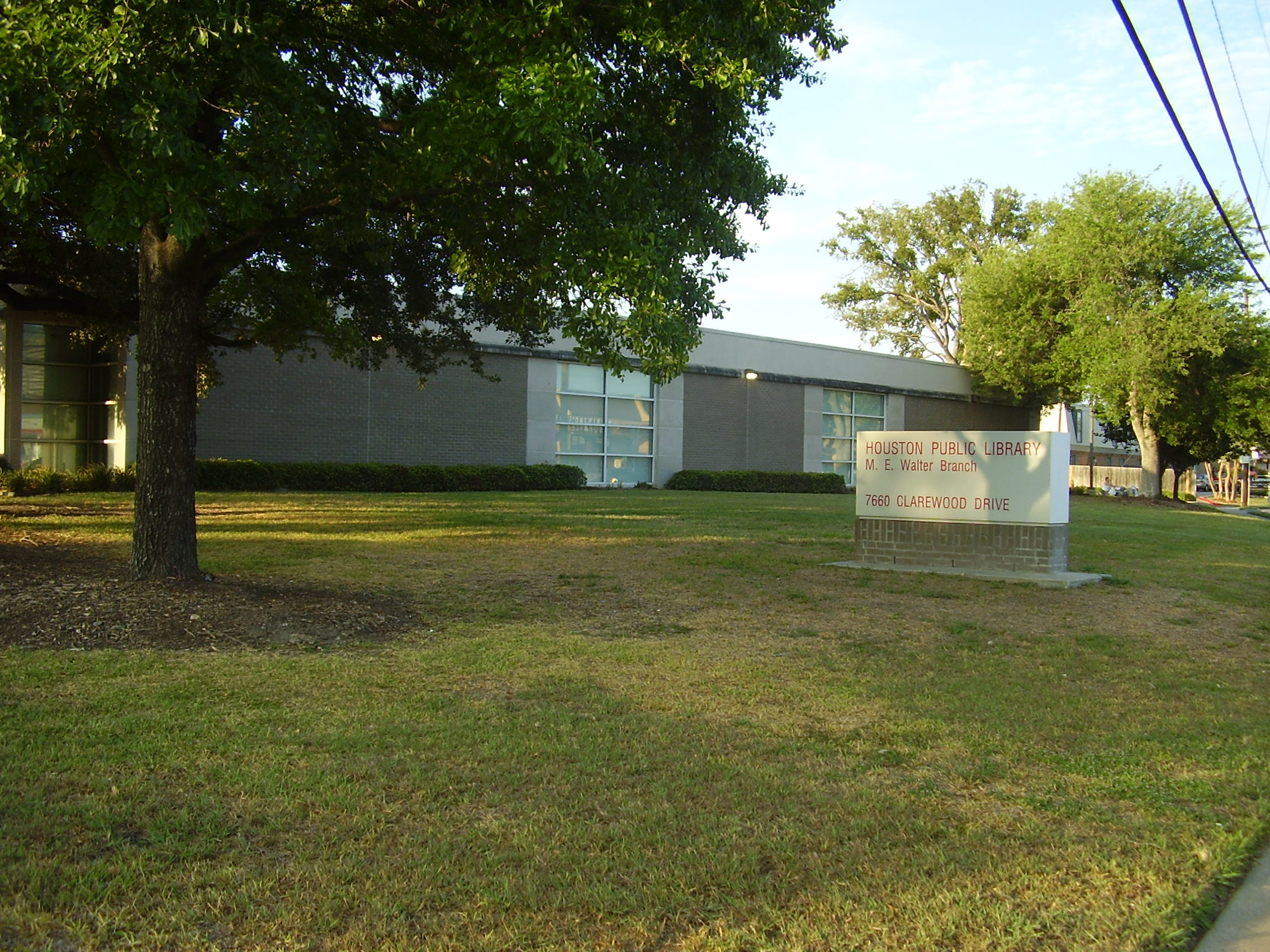
M. E. Walter Neighborhood Library

Two Houston Public Library facilities, the M. E. Walter Neighborhood Library and HPL Express Southwest, are in Greater Sharpstown.

=== Colleges and universities ===
Houston Christian University (renamed from Houston Baptist University in September 2022) is located in Greater Sharpstown.

Houston Community College provides the district's residents with community college services.

Westwood College's Houston South Campus was located in One Arena Place in Arena Place in Greater Sharpstown.

== See also ==
- Memorial Hermann Southwest Hospital
