= YES Prep Public Schools =

Charter schools in Texas, United States

Location
- Houston, Texas United States
- Coordinates: 29.6981918°N 95.3842968°W

District information
- Type: State charter
- Grades: K-12
- Established: 1997
- Superintendent: Mark DiBella
- Schools: 26

Students and staff
- Students: 12,650

Other information
- Founder, former President: Chris Barbic (SVP)
- Website: www.yesprep.org

YES Prep Public Schools, Inc. is a network of public, open-enrollment charter schools located in Greater Houston. Its headquarters are located at its Southside campus. The YES program is a university-preparatory program for grades K-12.

== History ==
YES Prep (Youth Engaged in Service) began in 1995 as Project YES. The program was founded at Rusk Elementary School in the Houston Independent School District by Chris Barbic. Since 1998, YES Prep has been operating under a state charter. In 2020, they began serving elementary education.

Previously, the headquarters were in the Greater Sharpstown Management District.

== District Partnerships ==
=== SKY Partnership ===
In 2011, YES Prep partnered with KIPP-Houston Public Schools and Spring Branch ISD, becoming the SKY Partnership. YES Prep Northbrook Middle School began in the 2012–2013 school year with only 6th graders. They added 7th graders in the 2013–2014 school year and 8th graders in the 2014–2015 school year. It's co-located with Spring Branch ISD's Northbrook Middle School, which also has 6th through 8th graders. Along with KIPP-Courage, which has 5th through 8th graders, YES Prep Northbrook Middle School feeds into YES Prep Northbrook High School, located within Spring Branch's Northbrook High School, which has 9-12th graders. YES Prep Northbrook High School opened in the 2015–2016 school year with only 9th graders. They added 10th graders in the 2016–2017 school year, 11th graders in the 2017–2018 school year, and 12th graders in the 2018–2019 school year. KIPP Courage College Prep opened in the 2012–2013 school year with only 5th graders. They added 6th graders in the 2013–2014 school year, 7th graders in the 2014–2015 school year, and 8th graders in the 2015–2016 school year. KIPP Courage is located within Spring Branch ISD's Landrum Middle School, which has 6-8th graders. Due to budget issues with Spring Branch ISD, in December 2023, it was stated that they had to close down the SKY partnership. YES Prep Northbrook High's Class of 2024 was the sixth and final graduating class.

=== Aldine and YES Prep Partnership ===
In 2013, YES Prep partnered with Aldine ISD. YES Prep Hoffman opened in the 2013–2014 school year with 6th graders. It's located within Aldine ISD's Hoffman Middle School. YES Prep Hoffman students feed into YES Prep Eisenhower, which is located within Aldine's Eisenhower High School, which has 10th through 12th graders. YES Prep Hoffman added 7th graders in the 2014–2015 school year and added 8th graders in the 2015–2016 school year. YES Prep Eisenhower opened in the 2016–2017 school year with only 9th graders. They added 10th graders in the 2017–2018 school year, 11th graders in the 2018–2019 school year, and 12th graders in the 2019–2020 school year where Class of 2020 was the first graduation. YES Prep Hoffman dissolved in 2022. After Class of 2023 graduated, YES Prep decided to close the partnership.

== Schools ==
As of the 2025-2026 school year, YES Prep operates twenty-six schools in Houston. Hoffman and Eisenhower, the Aldine partnership campuses, are closed down. Northbrook Middle and Northbrook High, the SKY Partnership were also forced to close down. :

- Airline Elementary (2022;PK-5th)
- Bray Oaks Secondary, home of the Cavaliers (2009;6-12th)
- East End Secondary, home of the Explorers (2006; 6-12th)
- East End Elementary (2022;PK-5th)
- Fifth Ward Secondary, home of the Titans (2011;6-12th)
- Gulfton Secondary, home of the Force (2007;6-12th)
- Hobby Secondary, home of the Aviators (2019;6-12th)
- Hobby Elementary (2024;PK-3rd)
- North Rankin Elementary (2024;PK-3rd)
- North Central Secondary, home of the Trailblazers (2003;6-12th)
- North Central Elementary (2020;PK-5th)
- North Forest Secondary, home of the Legends (2010;6-12th)
- North Forest Elementary (2021;PK-5th)
- Northline Secondary, home of the Revolutionaries (2017;6-12th)
- Northside Secondary, home of the Pride (2011;6-12th)
- Northwest Secondary, home of the Hawks (2018;6-12th)
- Southeast Secondary, home of the Wizards (1998;6-12th)
- Southeast Elementary (2020;PK-5th)
- Southside Secondary, home of the Giants (2015;6-12th)
- Southside Elementary (2021;PK-5th)
- Southwest Secondary, home of the Mavericks (2004;6-12th)
- Southwest Oaks Elementary (2024;PK-3rd)
- West Secondary, home of the Marvels (2009;6-12th)
- White Oak Secondary, home of the Owls (2013;6-12th)

In 2018, YES Prep also opened Thrive, an alternative school with students who had issues in their campuses.

== Recognition ==
As of 2017, all of YES Prep's eligible high schools earned a gold ranking by U.S. News & World Report. Two campuses are ranked in the top 100 in the nation and four are in Texas's top 20.

Seven of YES Prep's high schools were named among the nation's most challenging high schools by The Washington Post.

In 2010, Oprah Winfrey donated 1 million dollars each to six charter school systems, including YES Prep.

In 2013, Senator Ted Cruz gave up his salary during the government shutdown by donating $7,627.40, "equal to 16 days of gross pay," to YES Prep, which "he and Heidi support."

== Athletics ==
=== Records ===
- In 2014, YES Prep Southeast participated in the Texas Charter School Academic & Athletic League and won the state championship for boys' cross country team competition while the girls' team also placed second.

== See also ==
- Teach for America
- List of state-chartered charter schools in Houston
