= St. Agnes Academy (Texas) =

Private all-female school in Houston, Texas, United States

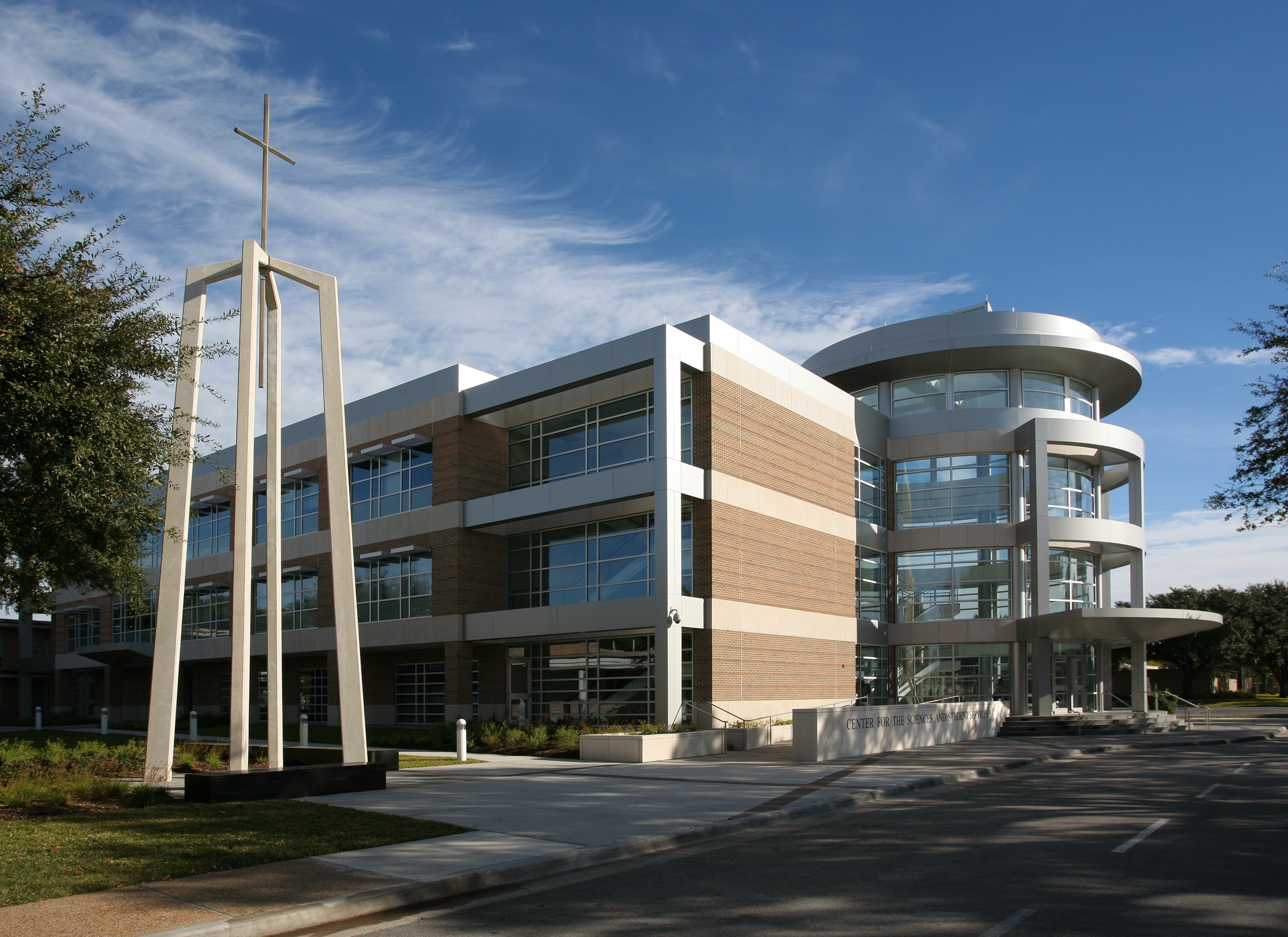
- St. Agnes Science Building

Location
- 9000 Bellaire Boulevard; Houston, (Harris County), Texas 77036; United States; 29°42′23″N 95°32′32″W

Information
- Type: Private, All-Female
- Motto: Latin: "Veritas" ("Truth")
- Religious affiliations: Roman Catholic, Dominican Order
- Patron saint: St. Agnes of Rome
- Established: 1906
- Dean: Courtney Orsak (Dean of Students)
- Principal: Carleen Raymond
- Head of school: Dr. Karen Jakuback
- Grades: 9–12
- Gender: Female
- Enrollment: 927
- Average class size: 19
- Student to teacher ratio: 12:1
- Hours in school day: 8:00 a.m. - 2:55 p.m.
- Colors: Black, Gold and White
- Athletics conference: TAPPS 6A
- Sports: Cross Country, Volleyball, Water Polo, Basketball, Swimming, Soccer, Field Hockey, Lacrosse, Softball, Golf, Track & Field, Tennis
- Mascot: Tigers
- Team name: Tigers
- Accreditation: Southern Association of Colleges and Schools
- Publication: Reflections (literary magazine)
- Newspaper: The Columns, Veritas Magazine
- Yearbook: Veritas
- Tuition: $28,400
- Website: www.st-agnes.org

St. Agnes Academy is a Dominican college-preparatory school for young women grades 9 through 12 in the Chinatown area and in the Greater Sharpstown district of Houston, Texas. The school operates within the Roman Catholic Archdiocese of Galveston-Houston.

== History ==
Pauline Gannon, a Dominican Sister, founded St. Agnes Academy in 1905. St. Agnes opened on February 11, 1906, at 3901 Fannin Street in what is now considered to be Midtown. The school was named after Saint Agnes of Rome. The school was founded as a grade one through 12 school with boarding facilities. The University of Texas and the Texas State Board of Education accredited St. Agnes in 1917. In 1939, boarding was discontinued. In 1952, St. Agnes began to serve grades 9 through 12 only. In 1963, the school moved from its Fannin Street location to its current location at 9000 Bellaire Boulevard in the Sharpstown area of Houston, Texas.

== Location ==
In September 1963, the school moved across town to its current location at 9000 Bellaire Boulevard (near the intersection of Gessner Drive and Bellaire Boulevard). St. Agnes Academy is located adjacent to Strake Jesuit College Preparatory, a Jesuit boys' high school.

== Culture ==
In 1974 Texas Monthly stated that St. Agnes had an image of being for "older Catholic families" since many alumnae of the school sent their daughters to attend St. Agnes. The magazine stated that students from both St. Agnes and Duchesne, another Houston-area Catholic girls' school, originated from "mostly business and professional people with money."

== Notable alumnae ==
- Hanan Alattar (Class of 1994), operatic soprano
- Alexis Bledel (Class of 1999), actress
- Patricia Gras (Class of 1979), journalist
- Leah Klenke (Class of 2022), soccer player
- Monica Youn, poet, lawyer, and professor

== See also ==
- Christianity in Houston
