= Metrobank =

Metrobank may refer to:

- Metropolitan Bank and Trust Company (Metrobank), a Philippine bank founded in 1962
- MetroBank, the subsidiary of MetroCorp Bancshares, an American bank based in Houston, Texas
- Metro Bank (United Kingdom), a British retail bank established in 2010
