= Chinatown, Houston =

Neighborhood of Houston, Texas, United States

Chinatown New Chinatown
- Neighborhood of Houston
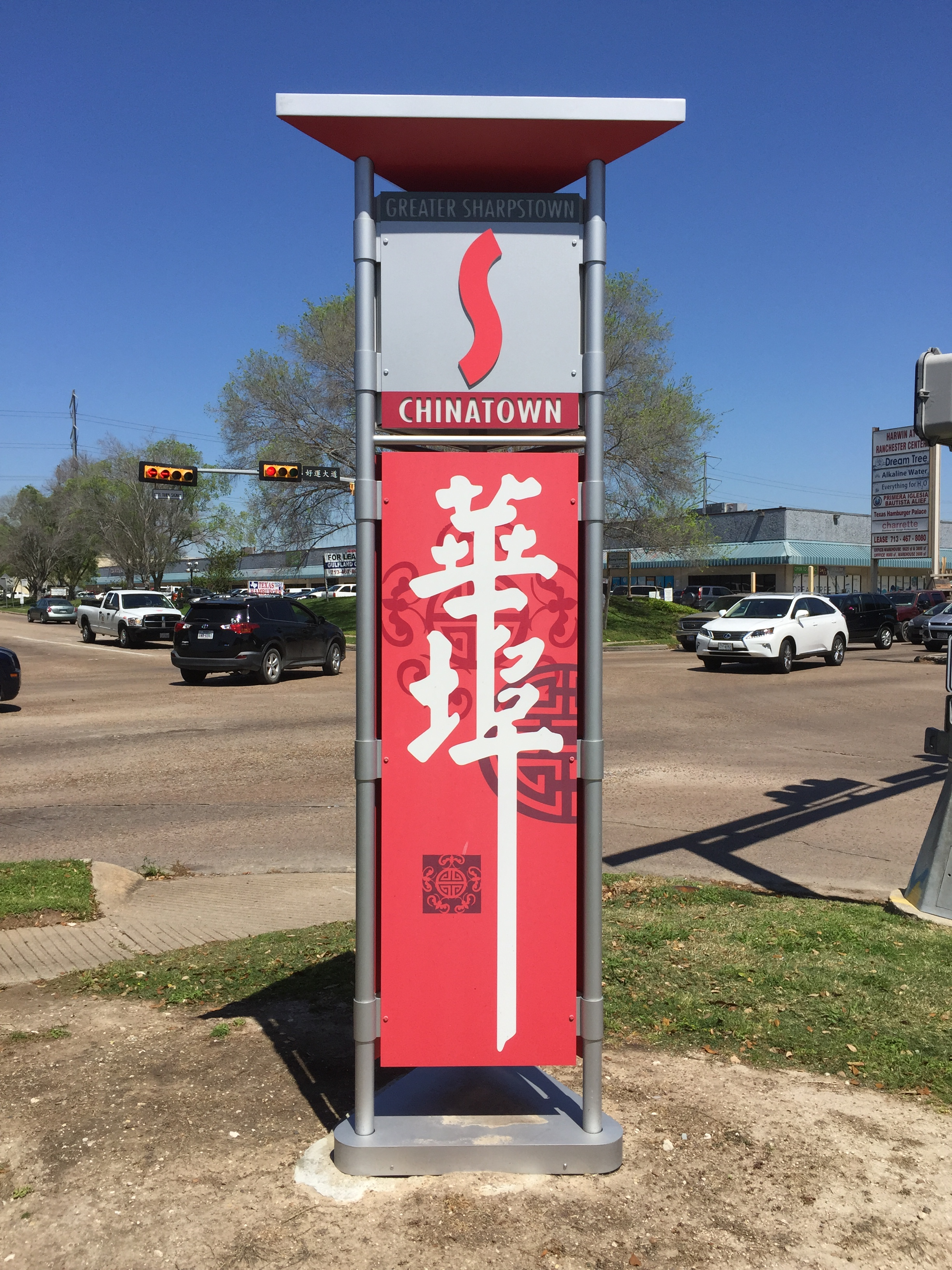
- Sign marking the Chinatown division of Greater Sharpstown (Chinatown logo designed by Willie Yang)
- Interactive map of Chinatown; New Chinatown
- Coordinates: 29°42′18″N 95°32′42″W
- Country: United States
- State: Texas
- County: Harris County
- City: Houston

Area
  - Total: 2.37 sq mi (6.1 km^{2})

Population
  - Total: 29,993
  - Density: 12,655/sq mi (4,886/km^{2})
- ZIP Code: 77036
- Area code: 713

Chinatown, Houston
- Traditional Chinese: 華埠
- Simplified Chinese: 华埠
Transcriptions
Standard Mandarin
- Hanyu Pinyin: Huábù

Alternative Chinese name
- Traditional Chinese: 中國城
- Simplified Chinese: 中国城
Transcriptions
Standard Mandarin
- Hanyu Pinyin: Zhōngguóchéng

Chinatown (Chinese: 華埠 or 中國城) is a community in Southwest Houston, Texas, United States. It is the third Chinatown to develop in Houston; the first was in Downtown, and the second was in East Downtown, near the George R. Brown Convention Center. It is also called "Bellaire" (after Bellaire Boulevard), not to be confused with the city of Bellaire. It is part of the city-designated Sharpstown Super Neighborhood. It is adjacent to Sharpstown, Westchase, and Alief.

== History ==
=== Old Chinatown and beginnings of New Chinatown ===
Houston's Chinatown began to coalesce in the early 20th century, but became more organized in 1951 with the Chinese Merchant's Association. Chinese supermarkets and restaurants opened in what is now called East Downtown or "EaDo" and most spoke Cantonese. Chinatown wasn't just a cluster of businesses for economic purposes, rather it was a social and cultural meeting place with a cohesive and complex identity that prospered from the 1950s to 1970s. However, Chinatown was not limiting the boundaries of Chinese life. Eventually, the Chinese community spread, which contributed to Chinatown's new location. Old Chinatown began declining and many Chinese businesses moved to around Bellaire Boulevard not only because of downtown urban development projects such as the George R. Brown convention center but also because of internal community decentralization.

The first businesses of the new Houston Chinatown opened in 1983. In the 1980s increasing numbers of Chinese were living in Southwest Houston and Fort Bend County and those residents were further away from the Chinatown in central Houston. Diho Square (traditional Chinese: 頂好廣場; simplified Chinese: 顶好广场; pinyin: Dínghǎo Guángchǎng), home to a Diho Supermarket chain outlet, was built, followed by Dynasty Plaza (王朝商場; 王朝商场; Wángcháo Shāngchǎng) in 1986 and 1987, a 120,000-square-foot (11,000 m^{2}) complex developed by a Singaporean friend of Diho Supermarket operator Tsang Dat Wong; the latter invited the former to build in Houston. Developers at the time bought land, inexpensive due to the recession, in hopes of prosperous development later. From the 1980s until the 2000s, the census tracts housing sections of Chinatown saw decreasing income levels and real estate values.

=== Prosperity and further changes ===
The new Chinatown began to expand in the 1990s when Houston-area Asian American entrepreneurs moved their businesses from older neighborhoods, especially the "Old Chinatown" on the eastern end of Downtown Houston (in the process of redevelopment), in a search for more inexpensive properties and lower crime rates. Hong Kong City Mall (香港城; Xiānggǎngchéng), owned by an ethnic Vietnamese man named Hai Du Duong, opened in 1999. In 2004 Nancy Sarnoff of the Houston Chronicle described it as a westward shift for Chinatown.

In 2005, Christy Chang, a tour operator who operated tours into Chinatown, said, "This area is not just Chinatown anymore. If anything, it's Asia Town" due to the presence of various ethnic groups that began establishing themselves in the community. The Asian American Business Council estimated that between 2004 and 2008 the land values along Bellaire Boulevard (百利大道; Bǎilì Dàdào) in Chinatown increased between 25 and 50 percent. In 2008, the group estimated that 2,000,000 square feet (190,000 m^{2}) in construction would appear within two years, including high-end condominiums. Lisa Gray of the Houston Chronicle wrote that the development of the remaining acreage would likely cause rents to increase and that, compared to many other Chinatowns in the United States, the Houston Chinatown is still relatively inexpensive.

In 2007, there was a debate on what to call the community, as it had multiple ethnic groups.

In 2008, the Asian American Business Council placed a contest to design a "landmark monument" to be placed on Bellaire Boulevard between Beltway 8(八號公路; 八号公路; Bāhào Gōnglù) and Gessner Road (吉順路; 吉顺路; Jíshùn Lù) to increase visibility among Asian Americans and non-Asian Americans and to beautify the area.

Xenophobia stoked during the COVID-19 pandemic caused a steep decline in customers, as malicious people spread rumors about Chinese-Americans in Houston. Jusgo owner said to KTRK-TV (ABC 13) that grocery stores and restaurants in Chinatown were deeply affected by false rumors that one of his employees had COVID-19. He reported declining foot traffic and lower sales.

By 2025 it also became known as Asiatown; Erica Cheng of Houstonia reported that this alternate name is controversial.

== Cityscape ==
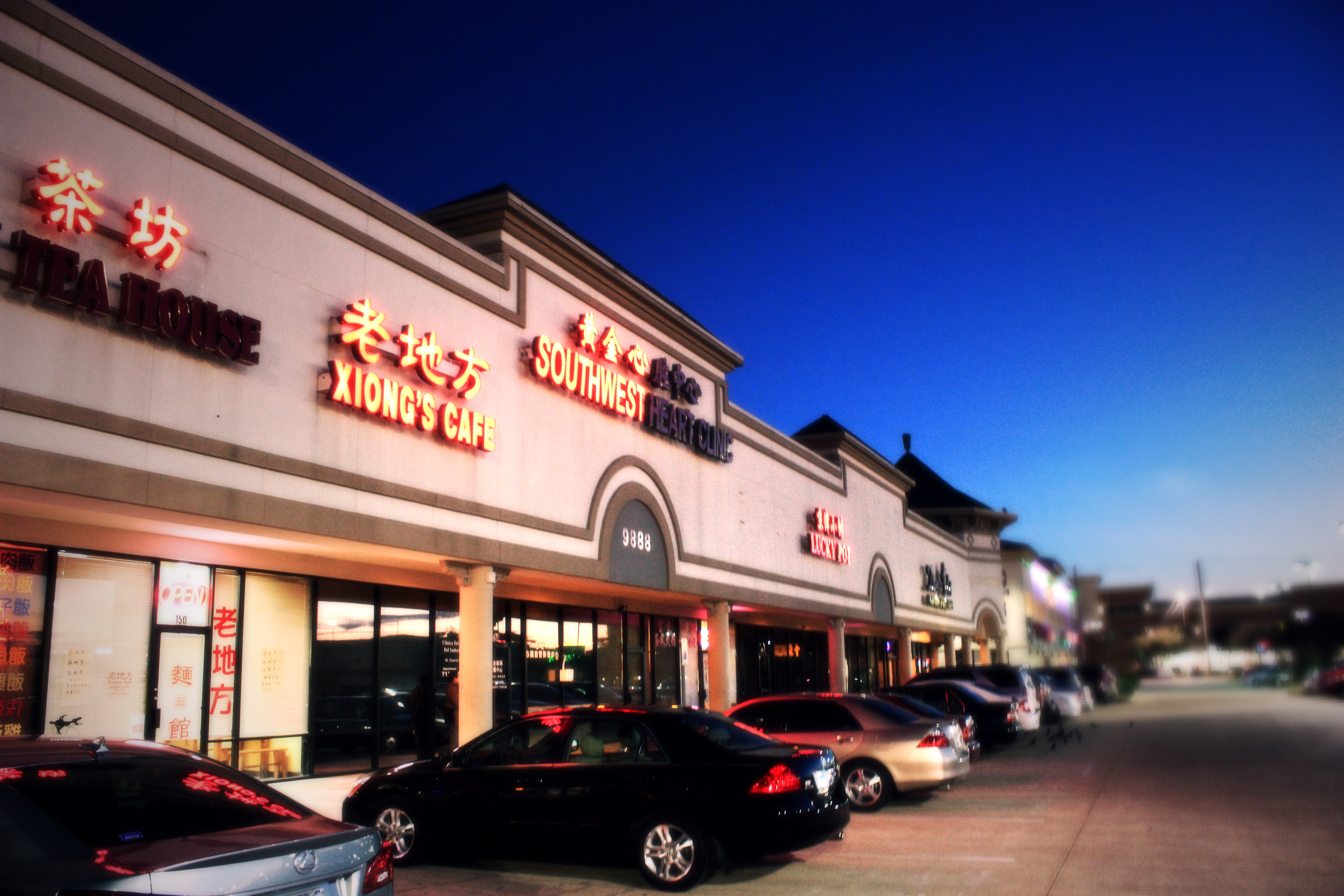
A retail center in Chinatown in southwest Houston, where restaurants serving authentic Chinese food are located.

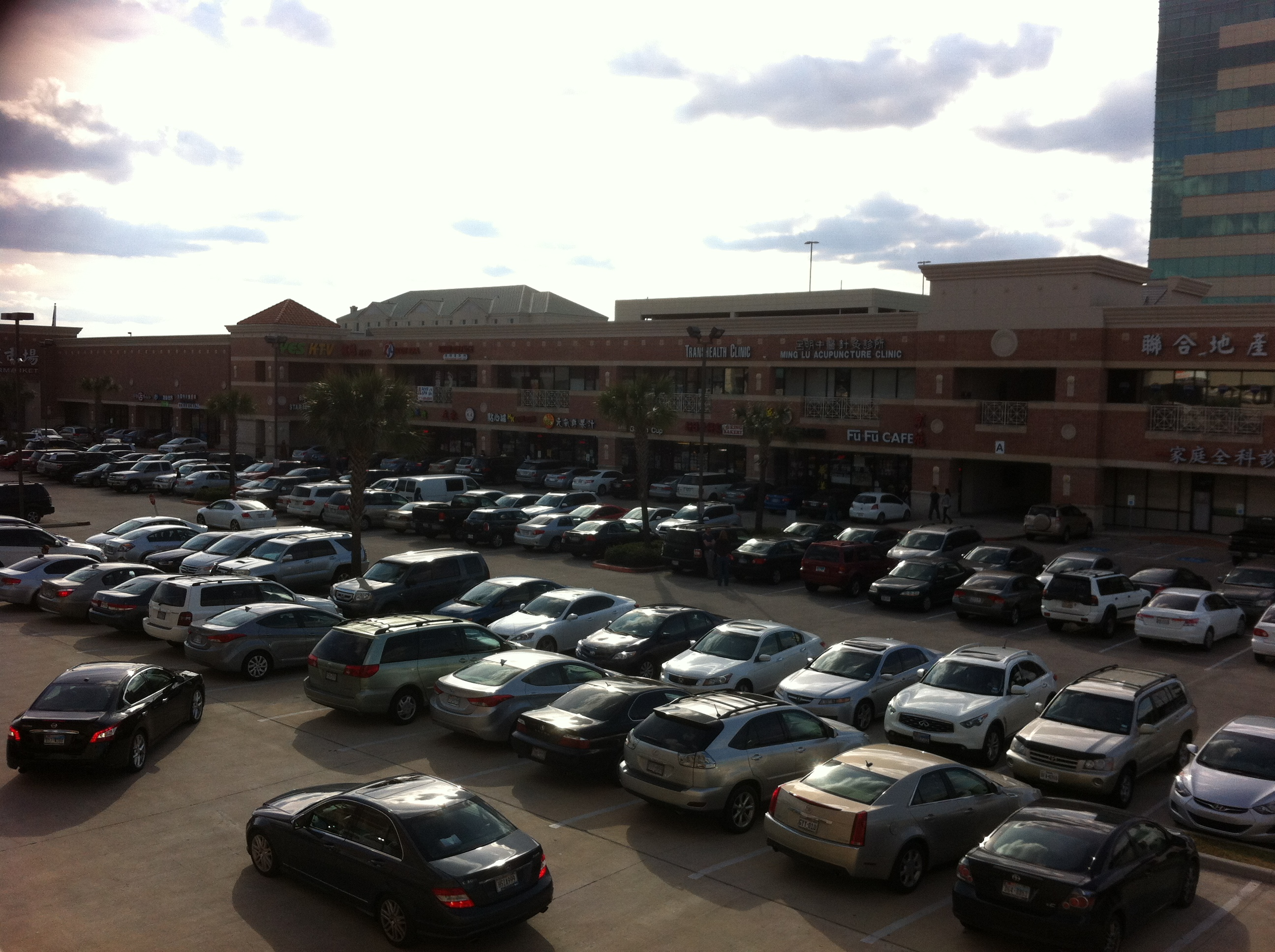
Another view of Chinatown, Houston, TX, USA

=== Geography and neighboring areas ===
The Southwest Management District (formerly Greater Sharpstown Management District) defines it as being roughly bounded by Redding Rd and Gessner Rd to the East, Westpark Dr to the North, Beltway 8 to the West, and Beechnut St to the South. The Greater Sharpstown Management District defines Chinatown within its borders as being a 2.37-square-mile (6.1 km^{2}) area.

The Bellaire Chinatown is about 12 miles (19 km) southwest of Downtown Houston. It is over 6 square miles (16 km^{2}), making it among the largest automobile-centric Chinatowns in the Southern United States. Chinatown is located on a mostly treeless plain. The community is between Westchase and the City of Sugar Land. Katharine Shilcutt of the Houston Press said that Chinatown was "straddling Beltway 8 on the southwest side like an entire city unto itself." Sarnoff said that historically the intersection of Bellaire and Corporate Drive (合作路; Hézuò Lù) served as the center of Chinatown, though that this was moving to the west by 2004.

Much of the land of Chinatown is owned by private entities, so there are relatively few public areas. The new Chinatown is located within a residential area of single-family houses and apartments, and its spread-out nature differs from the East Downtown Chinatown, which was in a relatively compact area. Many of the surrounding residential areas and office developments were built in the 1990s and 2000s.

=== Presence of other East Asians ===
Lisa Gray of the Houston Chronicle stated that this Chinatown resembles newer Chinatowns that opened in automobile-oriented metropolitan areas in the United States such as suburbs in Greater Los Angeles and the Silicon Valley, as opposed to older, uniformly Chinese, pedestrian-oriented Chinatowns in New York City and San Francisco. Gray said that in older Chinatowns immigrant businesses cluster together by ethnic group, while in newer automobile oriented Chinatowns retail operations from different ethnic groups move in next door to each other.

According to the Greater Houston Convention and Visitors Bureau (GHCVB), Chinatown along with Little Saigon (just west of the neighborhood) combine to form a combined Asiatown. The combined border roughly bounded by Fondren Road, Beechnut Street, State Highway 6, and Westpark Drive, and lies between Alief and the city of Bellaire. The naming is disputed as other ethnic groups are within the expanded boundaries. Chinese businesses tend to be inside the Beltway while Vietnamese businesses tend to be outside of the Beltway.

=== Asian businesses ===
The businesses within the new Chinatown include a mall, supermarkets, shopping centers, restaurants, and bakeries. The street signs have Chinese characters. Knapp and Vojnovic identified Hong Kong City Mall as the "symbolic center", and "visual center", as it houses the paifang (Chinese arch).

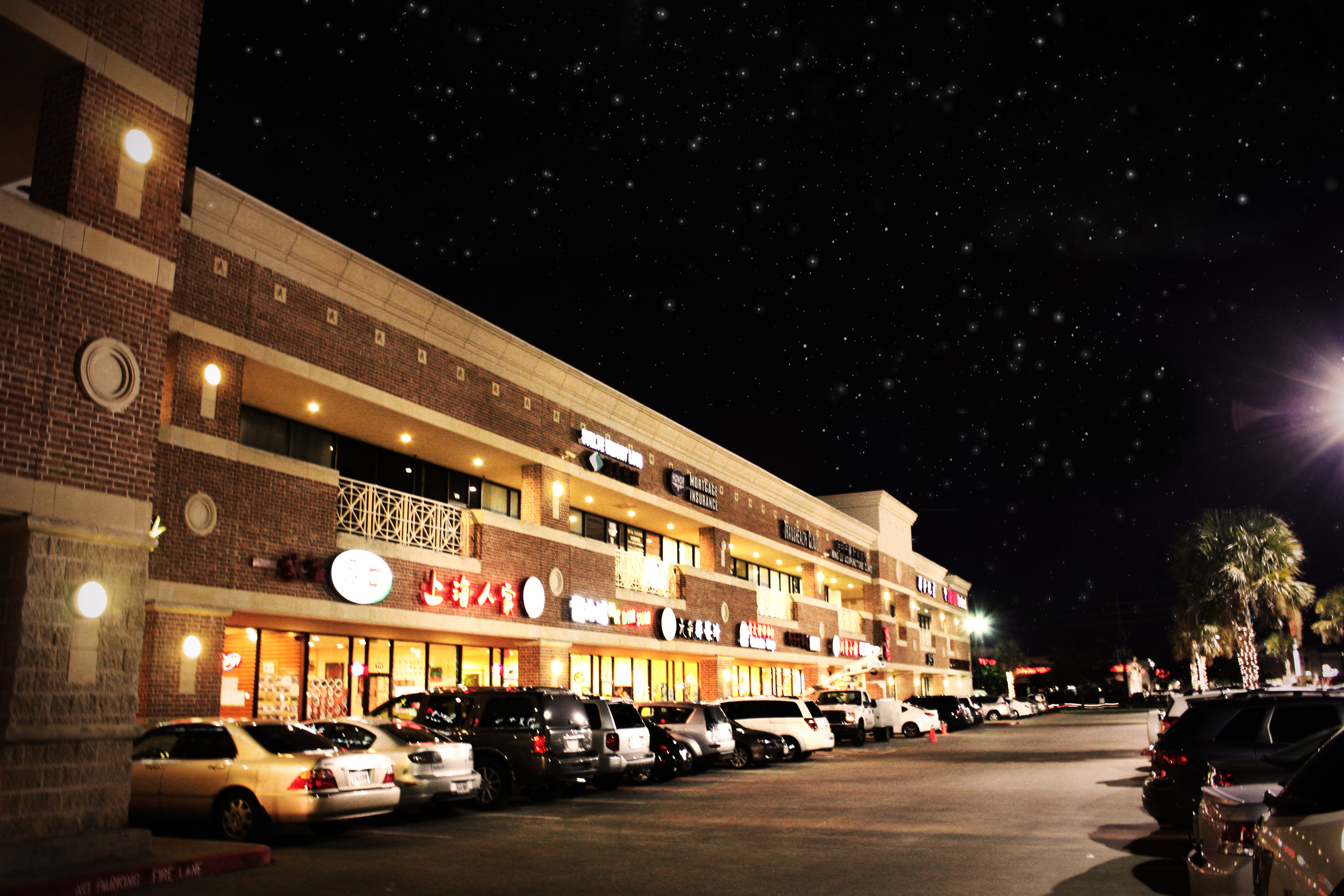
A retail center in Chinatown

The Bellaire Chinatown has many "retail condos", shopping centers in which spaces are owned instead of leased. Many East Asian people prefer to own shopping places instead of renting them. In the United States "retail condos" are rare outside areas populated by East Asian Americans. The community has restaurants serving many kinds of cuisines, including Chinese, Hong Kong and Taiwanese, Filipino, Indonesian, Japanese, Korean, Laotian, Malaysian, Thai, and Vietnamese. In addition it has restaurants operated by ethnic Vietnamese that serve Louisiana-style crawfish. The community also has many fusion cuisine restaurants. Shilcutt said that "the restaurant density in this area is roughly equivalent to the population density of Vatican City."

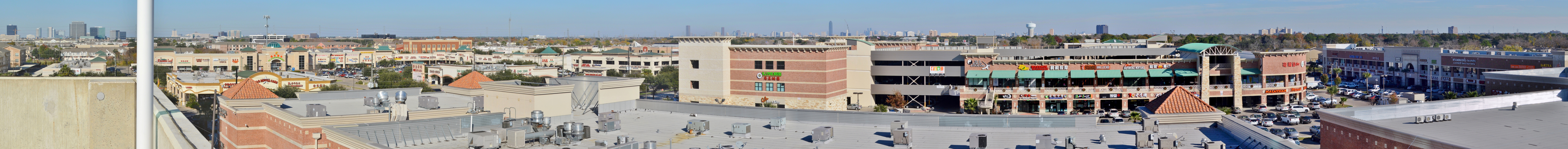
Panoramic view of Bellaire Chinatown shopping centers located east of Beltway 8

== Demographics ==
As of 2012, according to the Greater Sharpstown Management District the portion of Chinatown within the boundaries of the Greater Sharpstown district has 29,993 people. The clientele of this Chinatown tends to be middle class.

== Government and instrastructure ==
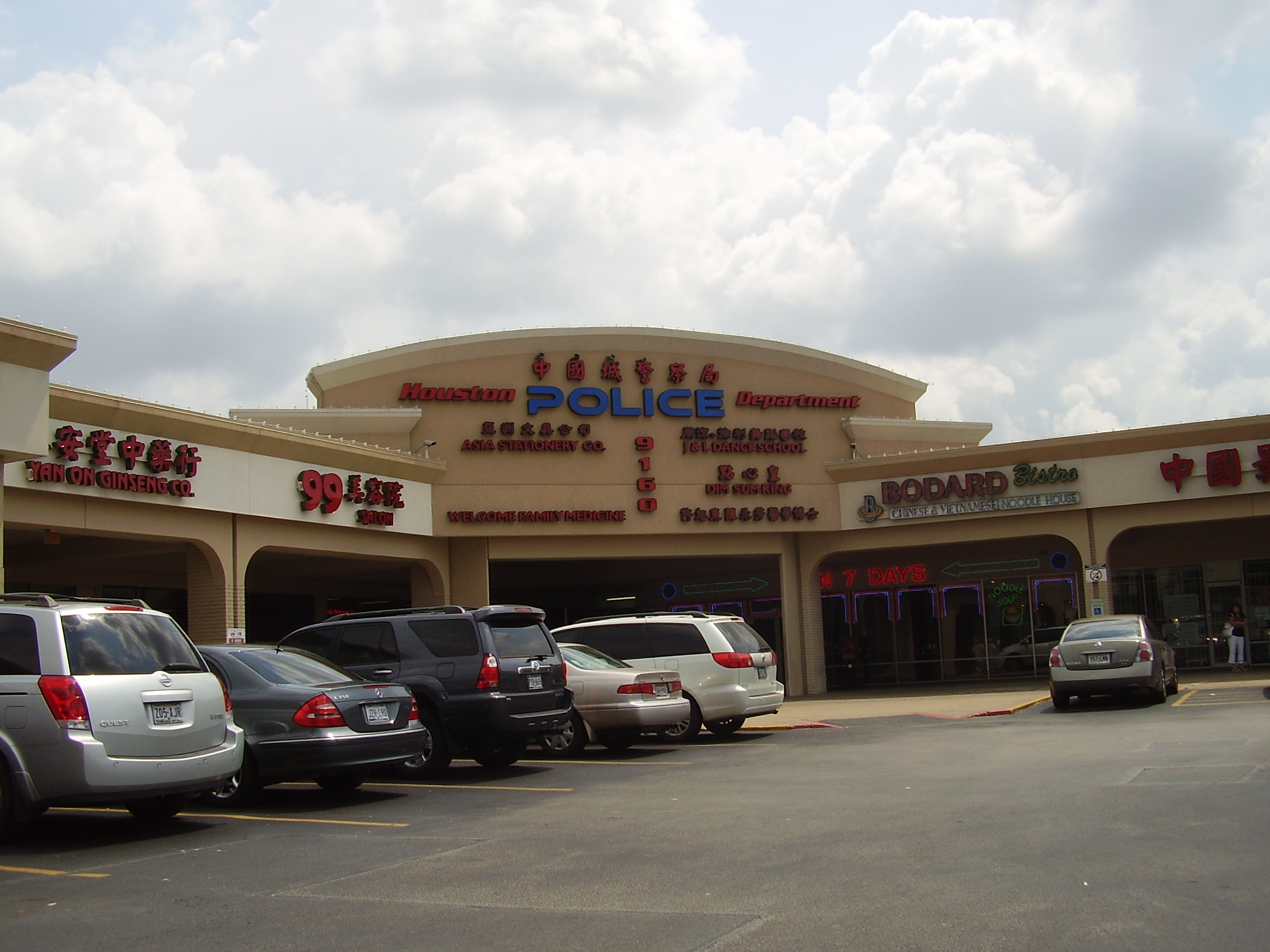
Ranchester Police Storefront (中國城警察局)

Two Houston City Council districts, F and J, serve the new Chinatown. District J was created to allow Hispanics to more easily elect representatives who cater to them.

The new Chinatown is served by two Houston Police Department patrol divisions, the Midwest Patrol Division and the Westside Patrol Division, of the Houston Police Department. The Midwest division operates the Ranchester Storefront (中國城警察局; 中国城警察局; Zhōngguóchéng Jǐngchájú "Chinatown Police Office") in the Diho Square complex.

Fire stations located within Chinatown's boundaries include Station 10 Bellaire (traditional Chinese: 第十號消防隊; simplified Chinese: 第十号消防队; pinyin: Dìshíhào Xiāofángduì "Fire Brigade #10") and Station 76 Alief Community, both a part of Fire District 83. Station 10, previously located in what is now East Downtown, moved to its current location in 1985. Station 76 was built in 1985.

== Economy ==
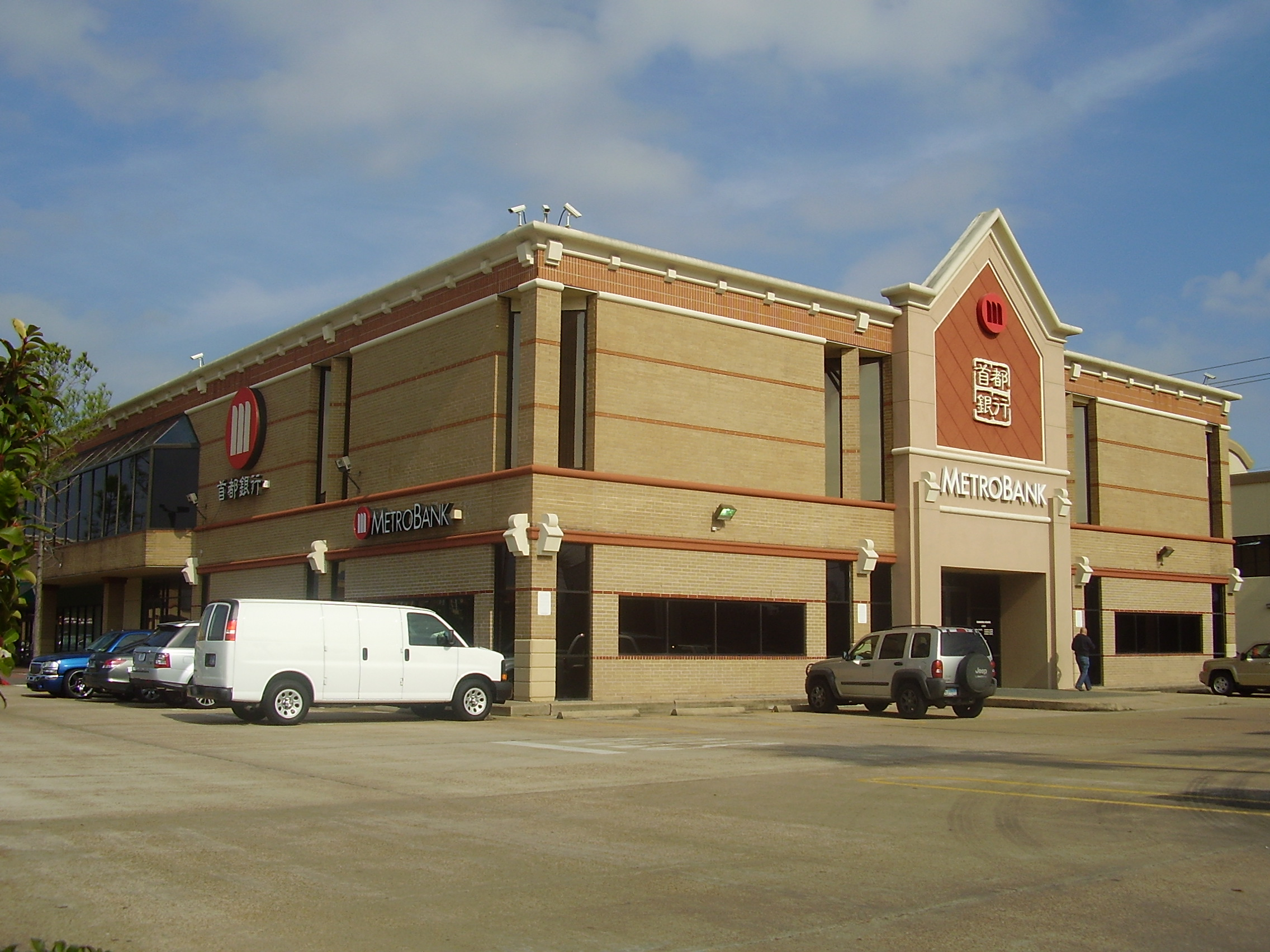
MetroCorp headquarters and MetroBank branch (now East West Bank)

=== Banks ===
Nearly a dozen banks, including overseas Chinese banks and mainstream banks, are located along a less-than-1 mi (1.6 km) stretch of Bellaire Boulevard, near Beltway 8. The clientele of these banks include area residents and Asian American entrepreneurs. Robert Lee, an executive vice president of MetroBank, said, "They call it the Wall Street of Chinatown."

In the three decades before 2007, Wells Fargo had one of the few bank branches in the area. Businesspeople began to open Asian American ethnic grocery stores and seafood markets. In the 1980s, Wells Fargo added signs in Chinese and hired tellers who spoke Cantonese, Korean, and nine other languages. During the same decade, local businesspeople opened MetroBank and Texas First National Bank during a banking crisis that hurt the state's mainstream banks. George Lee, the president of MetroCorp Bancshares, said, "All the banks were in trouble, and the ones that were not in trouble didn't understand the needs of the Asian community." American First National Bank and Southwestern National Bank opened in the 1990s. As of 2007, many Asian businesses operate in the area, and so Asian American banks have opened to cater to them. As of that year Washington Mutual (now JPMorgan Chase) was the last company to open a bank branch in that area of Chinatown. Texas First National is now known as Golden Bank.

Southwestern National Bank has its headquarters in Chinatown and Greater Sharpstown. American First National Bank maintains a 12-story, $30 million headquarters building in Chinatown. MetroCorp Bancshares and subsidiary MetroBank previously had their headquarters in Chinatown and in Greater Sharpstown.

=== Corporate campus and Park Eight Place ===
Halliburton previously operated the Houston Office (a.k.a. Oak Park Campus) on 67 acres of land in Chinatown and in the Westchase district. The complex included the Latin America division of Easywell, a division of Halliburton. The building first opened as a Brown and Root facility in 1979. In 2009 the Westchase campus had 1,700 employees; Halliburton plans to increase employment at Oak Park to 3,000. At the Bellaire site Halliburton planned to build a 16-story tower, a two-story "life center," an additional parking garage, expanded child care facilities, auditoriums, and bridges to connect the many buildings. In 2009 Halliburton had about 1,000 employees in leased office space in Westchase. During that year Halliburton said that it planned to vacate the leased space. The plans for the Oak Park office had been delayed by one year, and Halliburton expected completion in 2013. However Halliburton closed it in 2015, and in 2020 a planned demolition was revealed. The site is currently being redeveloped as Park Eight Place, a "pedestrian-friendly urban hub."

== Education ==
The new Chinatown is served by two school districts. Most of the New Chinatown according to the GHCVB definition is served by the Alief Independent School District, while an eastern portion is served by the Houston Independent School District. The HISD portion of the community is within Trustee District VI, represented by Greg Meyers as of 2008.

=== Alief Independent School District ===
Zoned elementary schools (K-4) located within the GHCVB definition of Chinatown include A. J. Bush, Chambers, Chancellor, Collins, Hearne, Liestman, Mahanay, Martin, and Youens. In addition Sneed Elementary School, outside Chinatown, serves a portion of Chinatown. Bilingual students zoned to Chancellor attend Youens, and bilingual students zoned to Mahanay attend Hearne.

Owens Middle School is a zoned intermediate school in Chinatown. Budewig, Miller, and Youngblood, outside Chinatown, serve portions of Chinatown. Middle schools in Chinatown include Alief Middle, Killough, and O'Donnell. A portion is served by Albright Middle, outside Chinatown.

Regardless of location within the district, all Alief ISD residents may be randomly assigned to either Alief Elsik High School, Alief Hastings High School, and Alief Taylor High School; all of them are in Chinatown. In addition the magnet school Alief Kerr High School is in Chinatown.

=== Houston Independent School District ===
Neff and White Elementary Schools are located in the Houston ISD portion of Chinatown. Other portions are served by Emerson and Piney Point elementary schools.

Most of the HISD portion is zoned to Sugar Grove Middle School and Sharpstown High School.

A portion of Chinatown is zoned to Revere Middle School and Wisdom High School (formerly Lee High School).

Prior to 2011, Sharpstown Middle School served most of the HISD portion of Chinatown. The portion of the HISD portion of New Chinatown south of Bellaire Boulevard was zoned to Sharpstown High School, while the portion north of Bellaire Boulevard was zoned to Lee High School (With Lamar High School and Westside High School as options). For a period after 2011 the Sharpstown zone was assigned to Sharpstown International School for grades 6 through 12.

=== Private schools ===
Strake Jesuit College Preparatory and Saint Agnes Academy are in Chinatown.

== Transportation ==
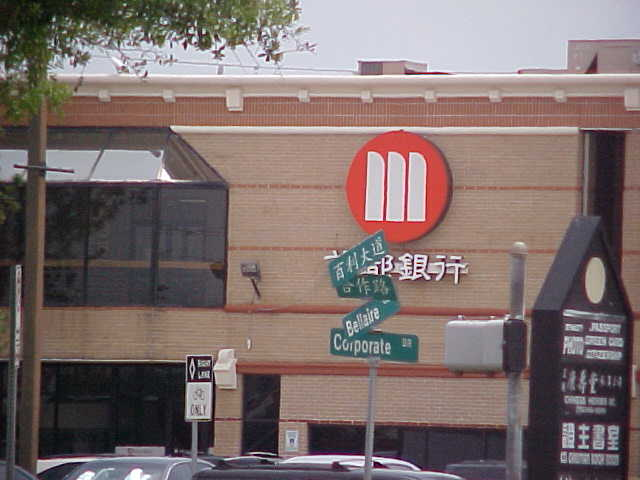
Many street signs are in English and Chinese – The pictured intersection is of Bellaire Boulevard (百利大道; Bǎilì Dàdào) and Corporate Drive (合作路; Hézuò Lù)

Metropolitan Transit Authority of Harris County (METRO) provides local bus services to the area.

== Culture ==
Chinatown is more than an economic cluster of Asian businesses- it is a cultural and social identity. Many people contributed to the preservation of culture and supported Chinese livelihoods. For example, the Southwest Chinese Journal was a bilingual newspaper established in 1976 which helped support immigrant life and often advertised local events and businesses. The On Leong Chinese Merchants Association also played a big role in helping new immigrants adjust to America, including housing immigrants in a dormitory.

=== Religion ===
The neighborhood is religiously diverse, with two Chinese Christian churches, a Buddhist center, and two mosques, among several other institutions.

=== Chinese Community Center ===
he Chinese Community Center located at 9800 Town Park Dr., Houston, TX 77036 is a multicultural center focused on bridging the East and the West and has many different programs and events that connect the community. The Chinese Community Center (CCC, 休士頓中華文化服務中心; 休士顿中华文化服务中心; Xiūshìdùn Zhōnghuá Wénhuà Fúwù Zhōngxīn, "Houston Chinese Culture Service Center"), an IRS 501(c)(3) organization and a United Way affiliate, is located at 9800 Town Park Drive. The facility opened in 1979 as the Chinese Language School. The CCC has several levels of English classes offered daily. As of 2006, at CCC about 80% of the students have university degrees, and the other 20% are their family members.

=== Mural ===
There is a mural representing the pan-Asian cultures made by Thomas Tran, called the Asiatown Community Mural. The organization Houston in Action gave a grant to the Vietnamese Culture and Science Association (VCSA), which hired Tran. Over 200 people created the mural without payment, and the mural opened in 2022.

=== Miss Chinatown Pageant ===
Since 1971, the Miss Chinatown Houston Pageant spearheaded by the Chinese American Citizens Alliance (C.A.C.A.) Houston Lodge has provided numerous scholarships to young women of Chinese descent. Winners have gone on to compete in the Miss Chinatown US pageant in San Francisco. The first winner was Cheelan Bo-Lin in 1971.

== See also ==
- East Downtown Houston
- Little Saigon, Houston
