= MetroCorp Bancshares =

Former bank in Texas, United States

MetroCorp Bancshares, Inc.
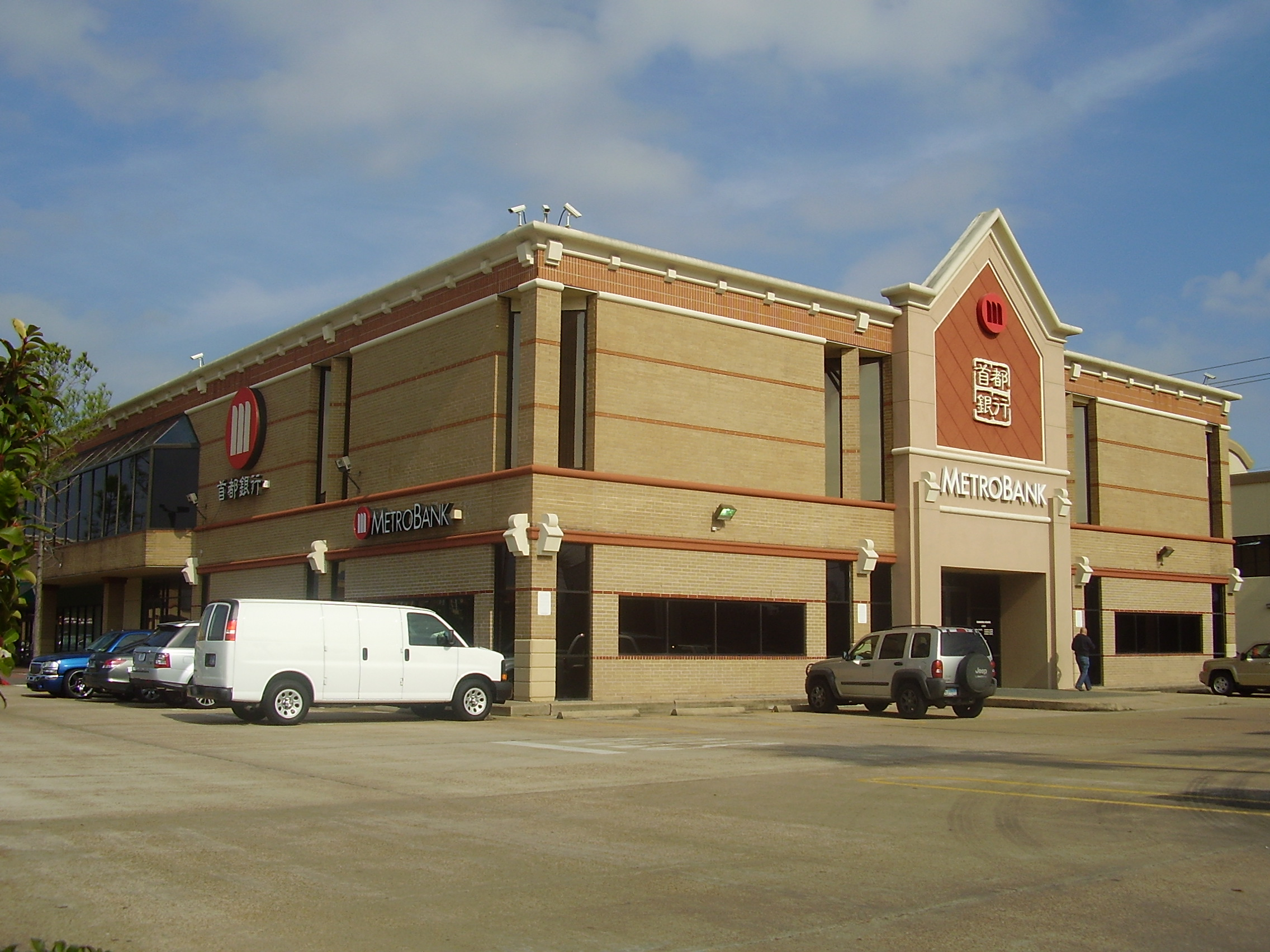
- MetroCorp headquarters and MetroBank branch - Dynasty Plaza, Chinatown and Greater Sharpstown, Houston, Texas
- Company type: Public
- Traded as: Nasdaq: MCBI
- Industry: Finance and Insurance
- Founded: Houston, Texas, United States
- Headquarters: Texas; California
- Key people: Mr. George M. Lee, CEO; Mr. David Choi, CFO
- Products: Banking
- Number of employees: 315
- Website: www.metrobank-na.com www.metrounitedbank.com

MetroCorp Bancshares, Inc. (MetroCorp, Nasdaq: MCBI) was an American banking corporation headquartered in Chinatown and in Greater Sharpstown in Houston, Texas.

MetroCorp, first incorporated in 1998, was an overseas Chinese bank holding company for two overseas Chinese banks in the United States: MetroBank National Association (MetroBank, simplified Chinese: 首都银行; traditional Chinese: 首都銀行; pinyin: Shǒudū Yínháng) and Metro United Bank. The company was one of the few overseas Chinese banks / financial institutions that were publicly held. MetroBank operated banks in Greater Houston and the Dallas-Fort Worth Area in Texas. MetroBank had its headquarters in its parent company's offices.

As of 2007 MetroBank was one of four overseas Chinese banks with its headquarters in Houston, and it was the only Houston-based overseas Chinese bank that is publicly traded. The other MetroCorp subsidiary, Metro United Bank, operated in California. Metro United had its headquarters in the City of Industry.

In 2014, East West Bank acquired MetroBank for $268 million in cash and stock, and MetroBank branches were to be rebranded in 2014.

== History ==
Metro Bank was founded in 1987 in SW Chinatown.

In September 2009, MetroBank had 10 Greater Houston branches and 3 Dallas-Fort Worth branches, with assets of $1.2 billion. Metro United had assets of $426.8 million. During that year, the Office of the Comptroller of the Currency asked MetroBank to revise its balance sheet. MetroBank signed a formal agreement with the office to do this within 90 days.

In 2010, MetroBank signed an agreement with Bank of China-Shanghai so that MetroBank could offer services involving the renminbi, the currency of the People's Republic of China.

== MetroBank ==
The first of the two, MetroBank (also known as Metro Bank), headquartered in Houston, Texas, with branch offices in Bellaire, Texas, Sugar Land, Texas, Dallas, Texas, Plano, Texas, Richardson, Texas and other communities throughout the Greater Houston, this bank was the original one for the company..

Like its competitor Southwestern National Bank, the location of in the bank in the south reflects one of the newest trends of Chinese American and Asian American population diffusion into the area other than the traditional regions settled by Asian Americans such as the western United States and northeastern United States. The rapid expansion of this bank in comparison to other overseas Chinese banks in the traditional regions where most Chinese American / immigrant and Asian American / immigrant was due to the booming economy of the late 1990s, in the regions of Telecom Corridor (Silicon Prairie) and Silicon Hills, which attracted a significant number of Chinese / Asian scientists and engineers. As of 2006, the asset of the bank is $976.384 million USD according to Federal Deposit Insurance Corporation.

== Metro United Bank ==
Although the establishment of its original bank marked the new residential trend of Chinese Americans and Asian Americans, a significant majority of them still reside in the traditional regions of the western coast of the United States. The huge market was simply too big to ignore for the company and it thus begun its expansion into California, the state with most Chinese American and Asian American population.

On October 5, 2005, the company purchased First United Bank, and its locations in San Diego, California and Los Angeles, renamed it as the Metro United Bank (simplified Chinese: 第一银行; traditional Chinese: 第一銀行; pinyin: Dìyī Yínháng), thus completed its expansion by venturing into the traditional region where most Chinese Americans reside.

== See also ==
- History of the Chinese Americans in Houston
