= YES College Prep Southeast =

Coordinates: 29.639428°N 95.207058°W

YES Prep Southeast
- Houston, Texas; United States

Information
- Type: State Charter
- Established: 1998
- Grades: 6-12
- Enrollment: 1009
- Hours in school day: 8:30 AM-4:00 PM
- Mascot: Wizards

YES Prep Southeast is a school in Houston, Texas. The mascot is Wizards. In 2007, it ranked #40 on Newsweek Magazine's Top 100 High Schools list and it was also ranked #38 by U.S News.

The YES Prep College Preparatory School System which stands for Youth Engaged in Service, was founded in 1998 when Christopher Barbic, now the head of the Achievement School District in Memphis, Texas, grew frustrated as he watched his sixth grade students move on to low-performing intermediate schools. Barbic decided to recruit some of the best teachers he could find and start his own 6–12th grade school. Year after year, student performance on the Texas Assessment of Academic Skills or TAAS test was significantly superior to that of other students in school districts across Texas.

Eventually, Barbic obtained a state charter, allowing him to expand the campus into a 6-12th grade school. Its first graduation was in 2001. Eventually, the YES Prep School grew into multiple more campuses across the Houston area (Southeast, Southwest, North Central, East End, Gulfton, Fifth Ward, North Forest, Brays Oaks, Northside, Southside, Northbrook Middle(now closed), Northbrook High(now closed), Hoffman(now closed), Eisenhower(now closed), North Forest, West, Northline, Northwest, Hobby, Southeast Elementary, North Central Elementary, Southside Elementary, Airline Elementary, East End Elementary, Southwest Oaks Elementary, Hobby Elementary, North Rankin, and North Forest Elementary.) in the Greater Houston Area. All of the school's colors unite with the color Navy. The school colors are yellow, Kelly green, orange, blue, silver, maroon, purple, red, and dark blue (in order) The newer schools start with just one grade level and work off from there gaining more and more students and teachers. It is an academically challenging school that tries to prepare its students for college. Every Spring students go on a trip to the United States for a week to learn many things and visit historic sites or colleges and universities. It has high school and middle school in the same building. The school director was Keith Derosiers. Now, the school has two new co-directors. Every year the school takes kids with good grades to other states and sometimes countries depending on their grade level. It is an outstanding school for low-income families and kids wanting to attend college.
