= Bellaire Boulevard =

Arterial road in western Houston, Texas, United States

- Bellaire Boulevard mainline and spurs highlighted in green

Route information
- Length: 16.7 mi (26.9 km)
- Existed: 1909–present
- Component highways: SH 6; SH 99 in Grand Parkway; Beltway 8 in Sam Houston Tollway; I-69 in Southwest Freeway (Houston); I-610 in West Loop

Major junctions
- East end: Holcombe Boulevard
- SH 6; Beltway 8; I-610
- West end: FM 723

Location
- Country: United States
- State: Texas
- Counties: Harris County and Fort Bend County

Highway system
- Highways in Texas; Interstate; US; State; Former; Toll; Loops; Spurs; FM/RM; Park; Rec
← SH 550	Route 610	→ I-635
← SH 8	Route 8	→ FM 8
← SH 68	Route 69	→ I-69C

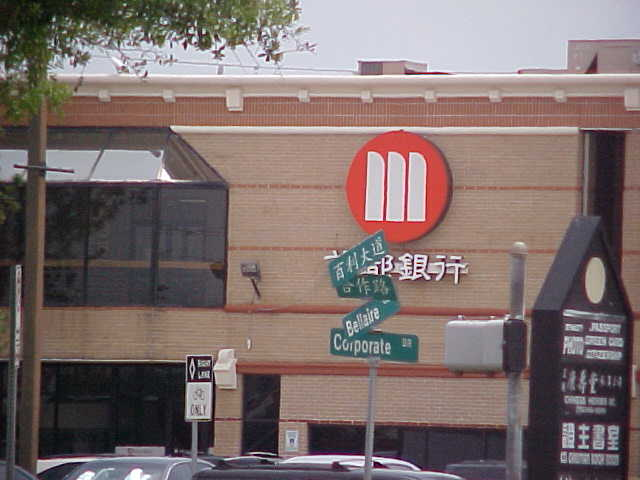
The intersection of Bellaire Boulevard (百利大道 Bǎilì Dàdào) and Corporate Drive (合作路 Hézuò Lù) in Chinatown

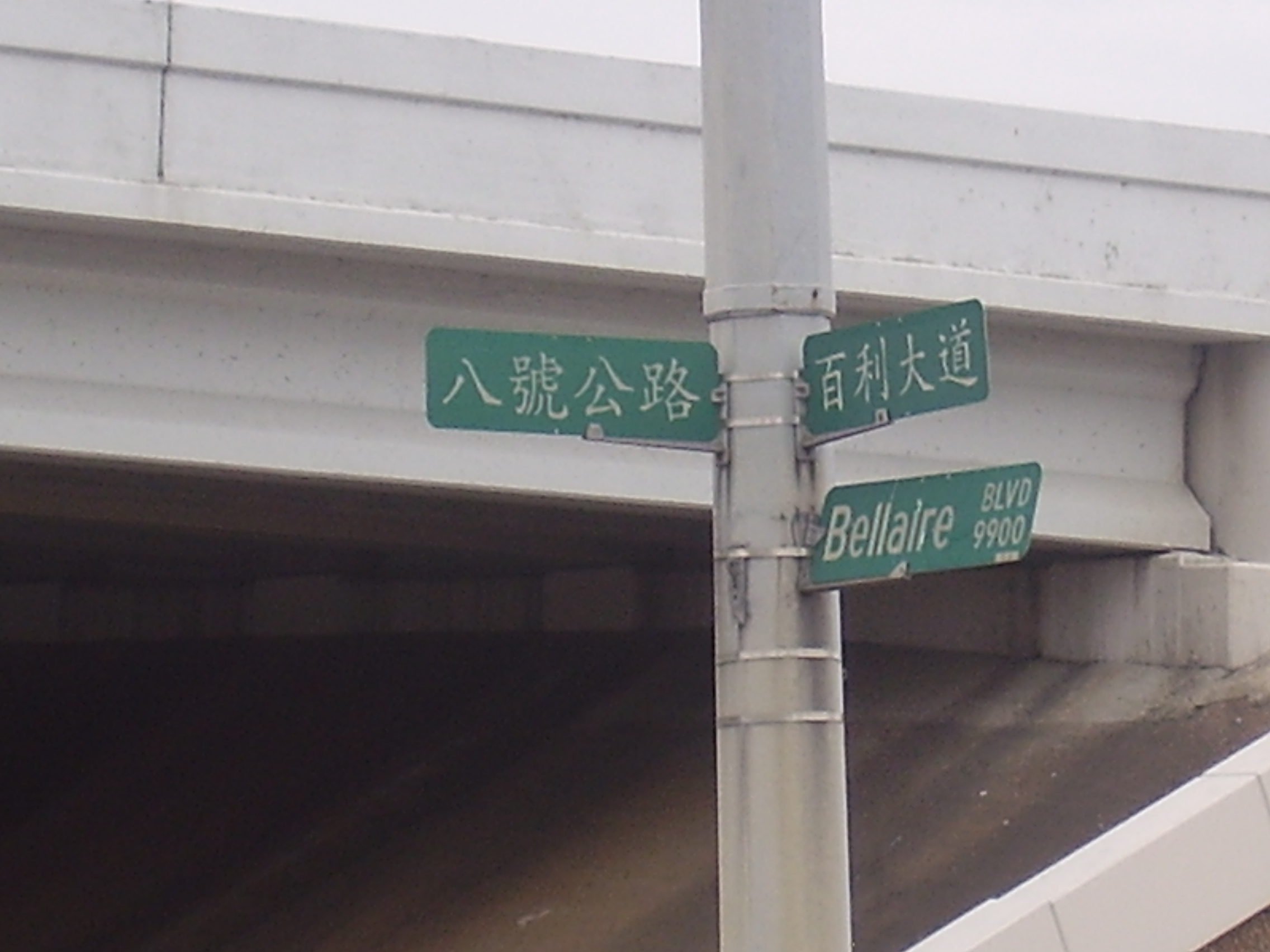
The intersection of Bellaire Boulevard and Beltway 8 (八号公路 Bāhào Gōnglù) in Chinatown

Bellaire Boulevard (also known as Holcombe, and as 百利大道 Bǎilì Dàdào in Chinese and Đại Lộ Sàigòn in Vietnamese) is an arterial road in western Houston, Texas, United States. The street also goes through unincorporated areas in Harris County and the cities of Bellaire, Southside Place, and West University Place.

Bellaire Boulevard goes through or next to the Houston communities of Alief, Chinatown, Gulfton, and Sharpstown. In addition the boulevard goes through the Greater Sharpstown management district. John Nova Lomax of the Houston Press described Bellaire Boulevard as "a world market of a street, a bazaar where Mexicans, Anglos, Salvadorans, African Americans, Hondurans, stoners, Vietnamese, Chinese, Filipinos, Japanese, Koreans and Thais go to shop and eat." The street ends at Holcombe Boulevard, which extends to the Texas Medical Center.

As of 2005, many Salvadoran immigrants live and work along the portion of Bellaire Boulevard in the Gulfton area. Many Asian American businesses populate the sections of Bellaire Boulevard in Alief and Chinatown.

From west to east, the east segment begins at FM 723 in Richmond and concludes at Edloe Street in Southside Place where it changes into Holcombe Blvd. It is 16.7 miles long. The western segment is 6.2 miles long, beginning (from east to west) at Harlem Road in Richmond and concluding at FM 723 where it becomes Fulshear-Gaston Road. The two segments together run for 22.9 miles. A proposed extension would combine the two segments into one.

== History ==
William Wright Baldwin, who was the president of the South End Land Company in the 1900s and 1910s, constructed the portion of Bellaire Boulevard from the Bellaire town site to Main Street in Houston. He also incorporated the Westmoreland Railroad Company to build an electric streetcar line down the centre of the boulevard. The streetcar, known as the "Toonerville Trolley," operated from December 12, 1910, until bus service replaced it on September 26, 1927.
