= Harwin Drive =

Road in Houston, Texas

Coordinates: 29.71760°N 95.5397°W

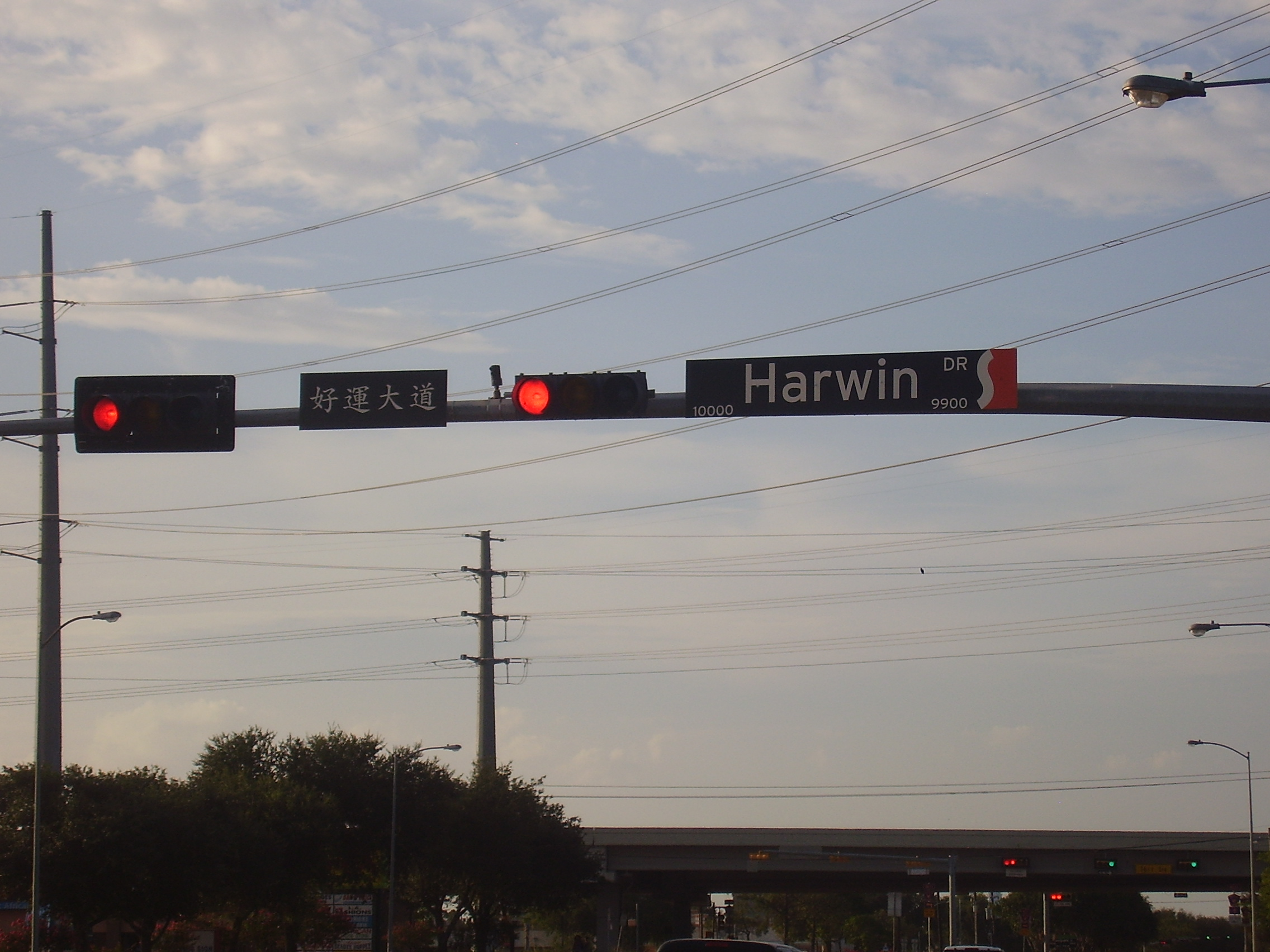
Harwin Drive (好运大道 Hǎoyùn Dàdào)

Harwin Drive is a road in Houston, Texas. The Greater Houston Convention and Visitors Bureau identifies the section between Interstate 69/U.S. Route 59 (Southwest Freeway) and Beltway 8 as being a shopping district.

Harwin has many strip malls with discount shops and wholesale warehouses. Allison Wollam said that the street has a "bargain mile" image among Houstonians (Houston citizens). The Houston Press stated that Harwin was "Houston's shadiest and quirkiest shopping hot spot."

Jenalia Moreno of the Houston Chronicle said that Harwin was "a strip known by local fashionistas as ground zero for affordable purses, clothing, shoes and jewelry" but cautioned that the "dirt cheap prices" might indicate the branded items were fakes.

== History ==
In 2005 the Houston Press ranked Harwin Drive as the "Best Mall Alternative" in its 2005 Best of Houston awards. In 2010 Coach, Inc. filed lawsuits against six businesses on Harwin, accusing them of selling fake merchandise.

== Stores and merchandise ==
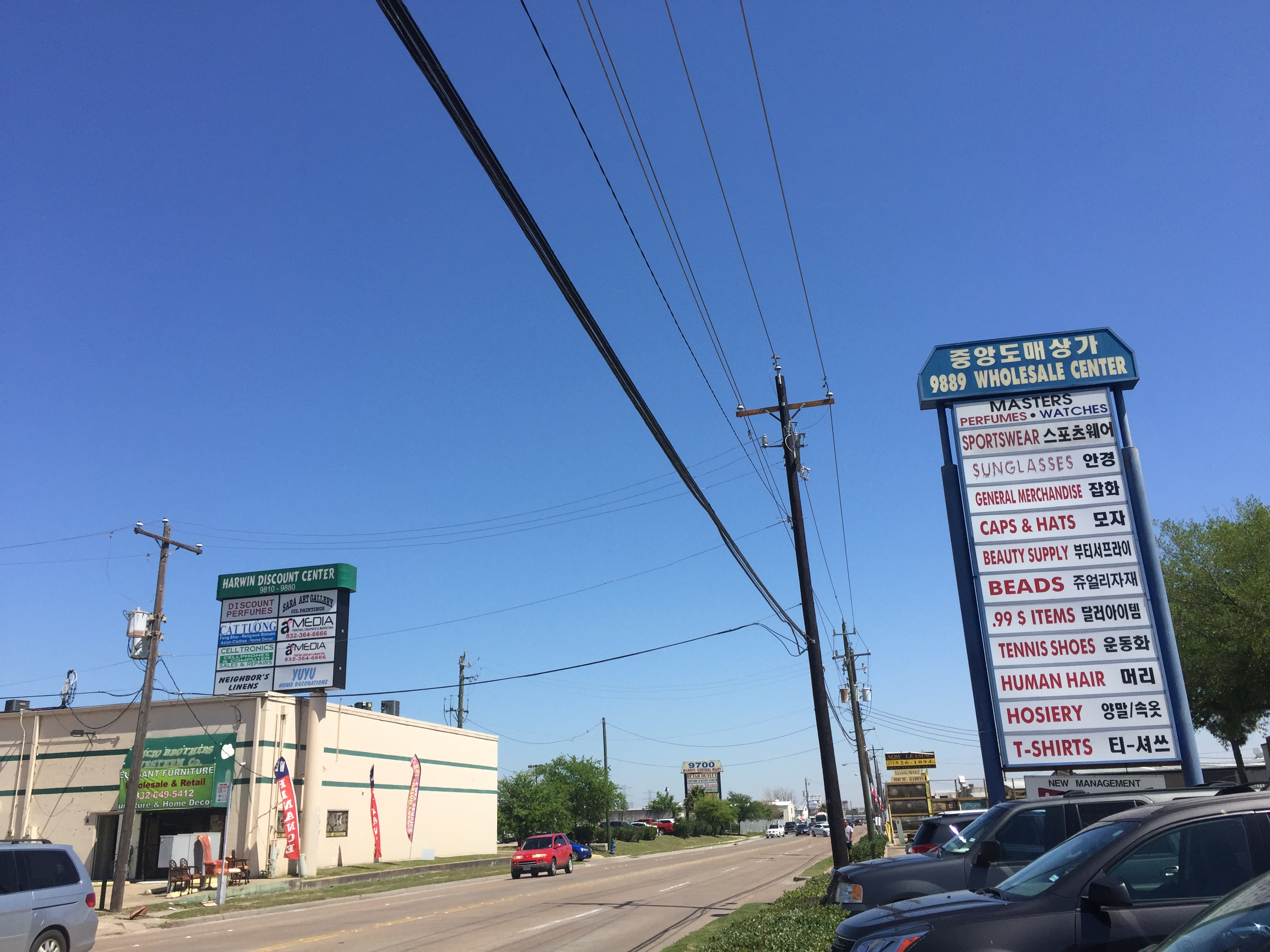
Businesses on Harwin Drive

Most of the stores on Harwin Drive are clustered together. The Houston Chronicle stated "There are no places to relax on Harwin -- no food courts, dressing rooms or restrooms. Just a string of shops owned by people from all around the world who don't mind a bit of haggling." The Houston Press stated that most of the stores are operated by "often-cranky" Chinese women.

As of 2005 stores on Harwin sell fake purses that typically retailed for $30. They also sold genuine perfume for half of the prices found in department stores. As of that year stores that sell East or South Asian clothing typically are closed on Tuesdays. The Chronicle said "Locals know the Harwin fake situation for bags and luggage, but ask a store employee, and they may act clueless. Designers don't appreciate the copying of their high-price items. Stores selling these bags know this and will gauge your interest before showing the goods."

As of 2010 a Coach Inc. handbag, which may or may not be fake, would sell for $35 on Harwin, while it would sell for $150 in a department store. A fake Harwin keychain would cost $5 while a conventional keychain would cost $35.
