= Southwestern National Bank =

Community bank in Texas, U.S.

Southwestern Bank
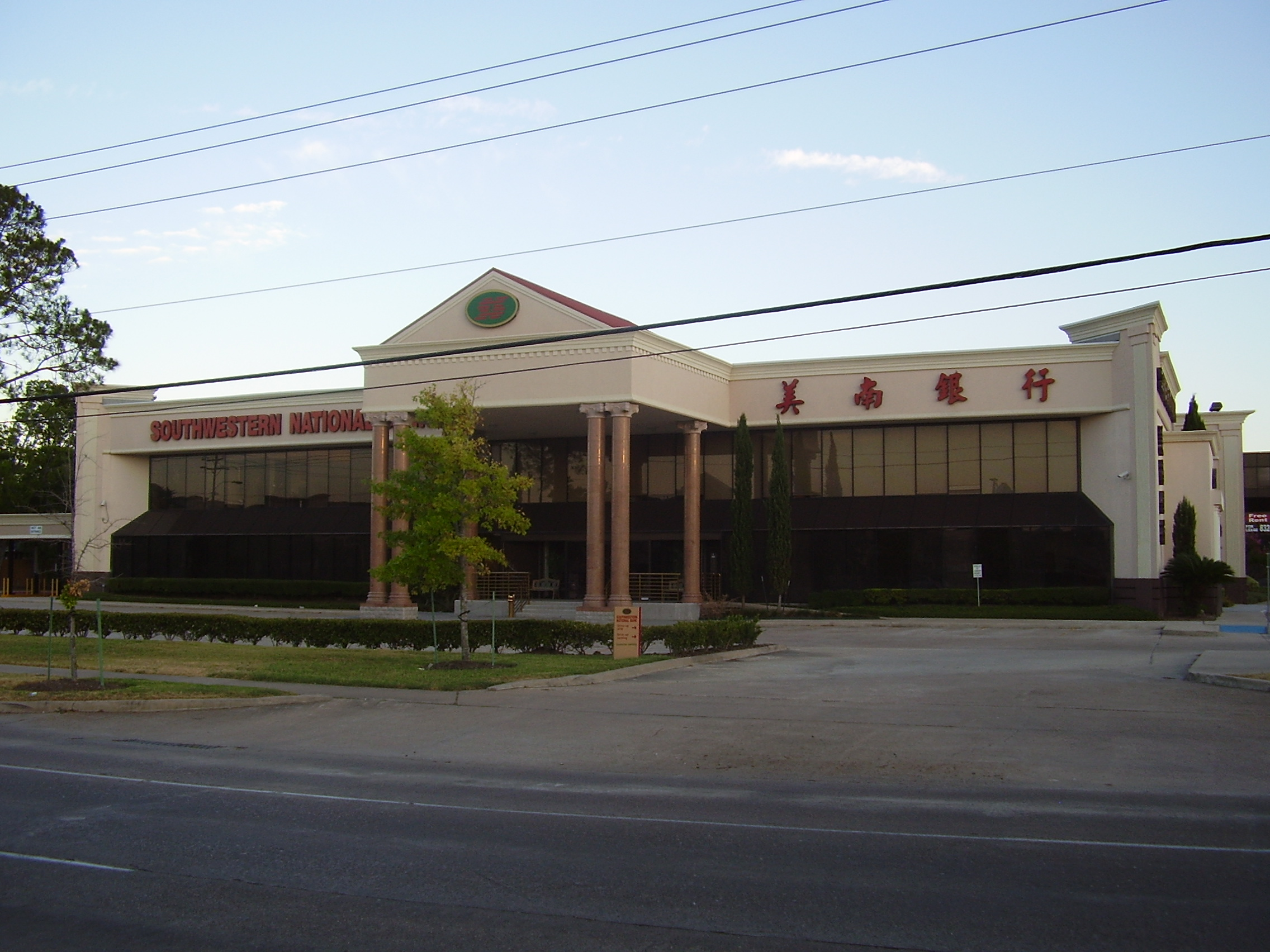
- Southwestern National Bank headquarters in Chinatown, Houston
- Native name: 美南銀行
- Type: Private
- Industry: Financial services
- Founded: November 3, 1997; 28 years ago in Houston, Texas
- Headquarters: Houston, Texas, United States
- Key people: Jody Lee, Chairwomen Joanne Kim, CEO Mohammed Younus, President
- Services: Banking
- Website: www.southwesternbank.com

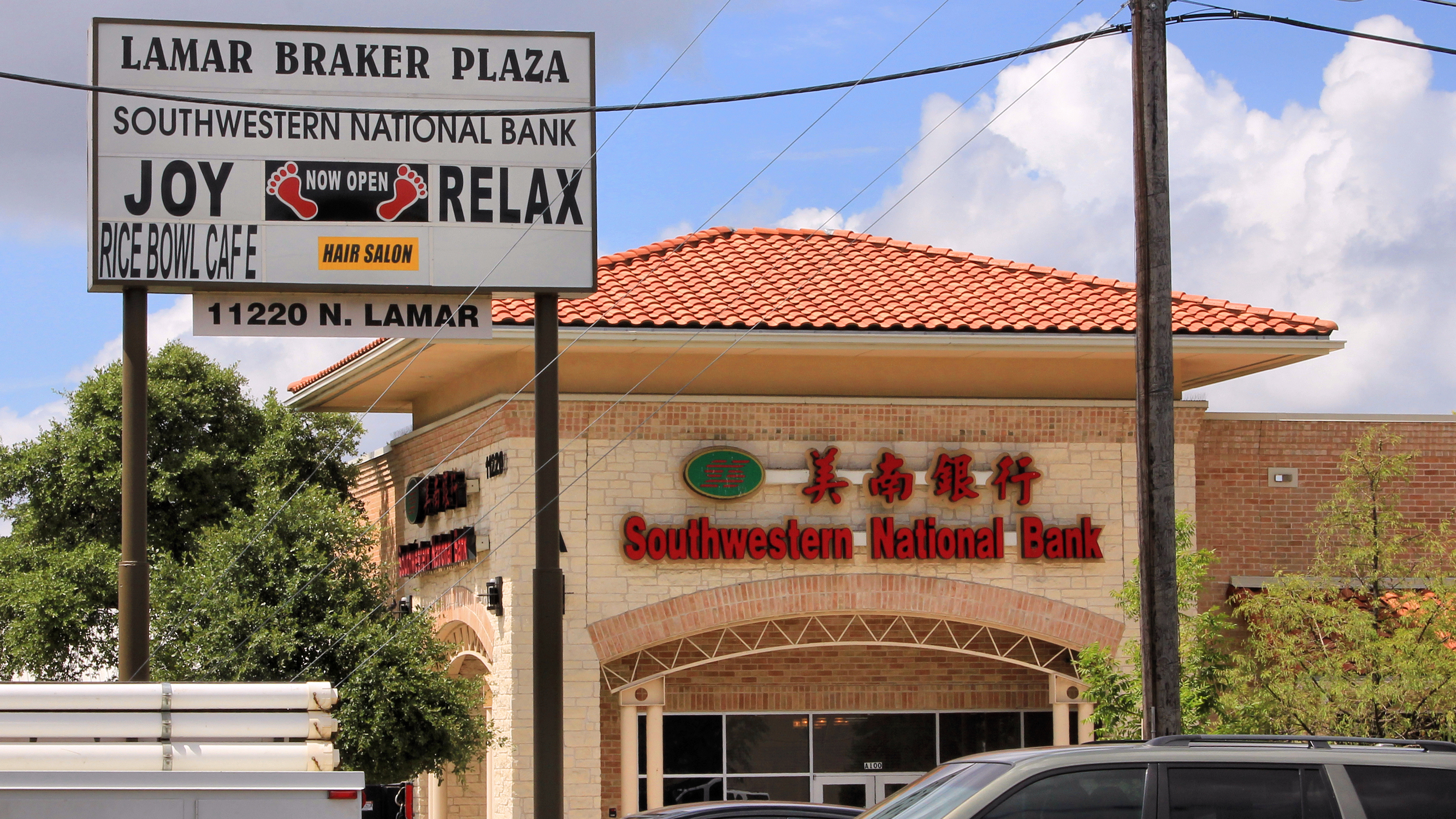
Austin, Texas branch

Southwestern National Bank (Chinese: 美南銀行), doing business as Southwestern Bank, is a United States-based community bank, with headquarters in Houston, Texas, that focuses on Asian Americans. Southwestern National Bank currently has branch locations within the Texas and California regions. In May 2026, the bank began branding itself publicly as Southwestern Bank, while retaining the legal name Southwestern National Bank.

== History ==
The location of Southwestern National Bank in the south reflects one of the newest trends of Chinese American and Asian American population diffusion into areas other than the traditional regions settled by Asian Americans, such as the western United States and northeastern United States. The establishment of this bank was in accompaniment with the booming economy of the late 1990s of Chinatown, Houston and also the Telecom Corridor (Silicon Prairie) in suburban Dallas, Texas. These two trends attracted a significant number of Chinese / Asian scientists, engineers, immigrants, businessman, and real estate investors into the area.

== Overview ==
Southwestern National Bank offers a range of commercial banking services, including deposits, loans, trade finance, online banking, and cash management, to businesses and residents in its service areas.

== Other sources ==
- Bank bets on growth in Asian communities
- Moreno, Jenalia. "Houston Banks cater to Asian Businesses." (Archive) Houston Chronicle.
- Houston-based banks feel less subprime pain
