= BAWAG =

Austrian bank

Bank für Arbeit und Wirtschaft AG
- Type: Public
- Traded as: WBAG: BG; ATX Index component
- ISIN: AT0000BAWAG2
- Industry: Banking
- Founded: 1922
- Headquarters: Vienna, Austria
- Key people: Anas Abuzaakouk (CEO)
- Products: Retail and corporate banking with focus on Austria and select Western European countries
- Total assets: €71,675 million (Q1 2026)
- Number of employees: 3,305 (31.12.2023)
- Website: www.bawagpsk.com

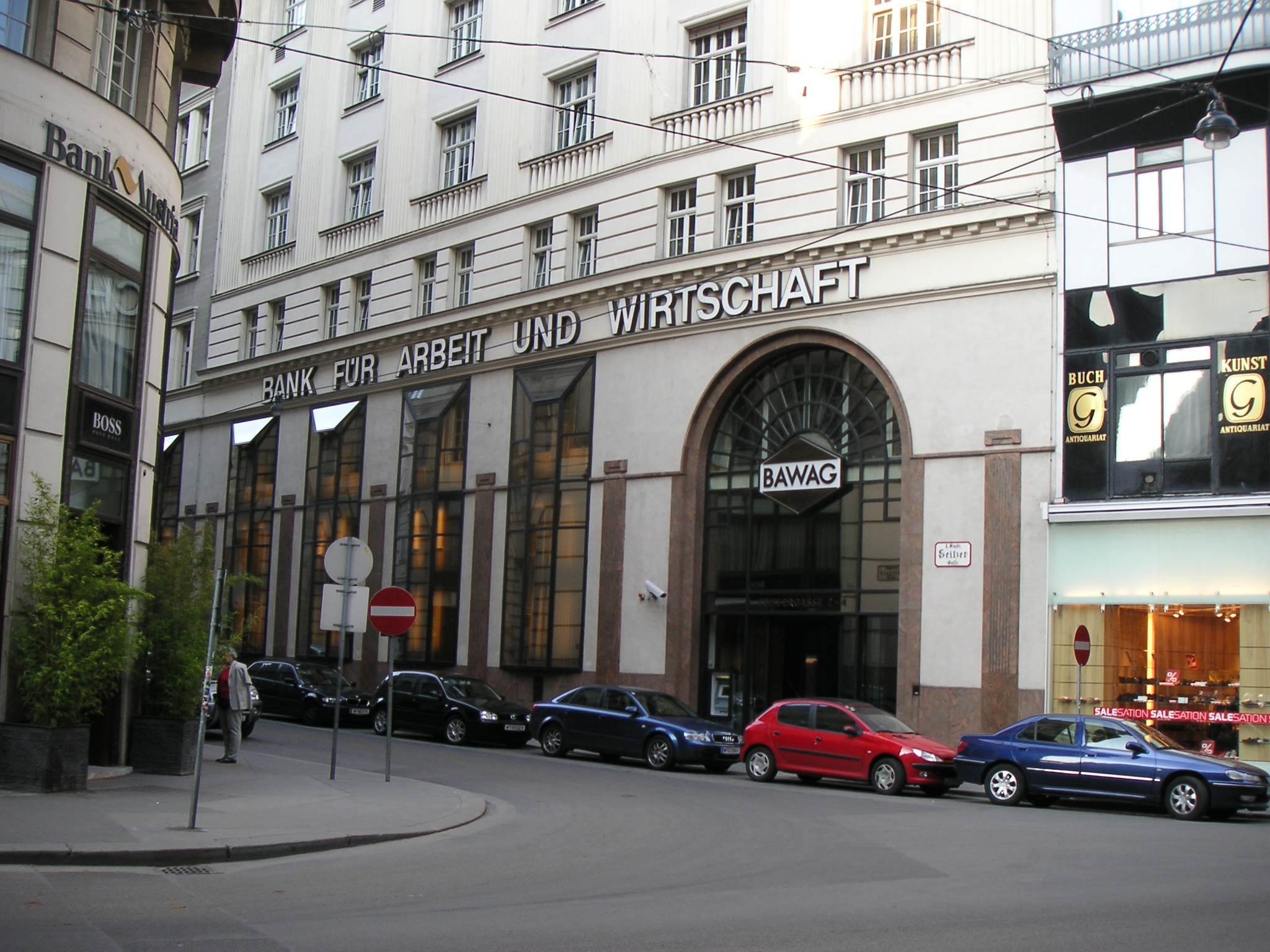
BAWAG headquarters in the Seitzergasse in the first Viennese district Innere Stadt

BAWAG (Abbreviation of German: Bank für Arbeit und Wirtschaft, pronounced [baŋk fyːɐ̯ ˈʔaʁbaɪt ʊnt ˈvɪʁtʃaft], lit. 'Bank for Labor and Economy') was a bank in Austria founded in 1922. On October 1, 2005, it merged with the separate Österreichische Postsparkasse (PSK) to form the "Bank für Arbeit und Wirtschaft und Österreichische Postsparkasse AG", shortened to BAWAG PSK. In October 2017, BAWAG Group AG, the holding company of BAWAG PSK, became a listed company on the Vienna Stock Exchange. Largest shareholders are GoldenTree Asset Management (21.8%) and T. Rowe Price (5.6%).

BAWAG has been designated as a Significant Institution since the entry into force of European Banking Supervision in late 2014, and as a consequence is directly supervised by the European Central Bank.

== History ==
Old logo of BAWAG before 2007

=== Bank für Arbeit und Wirtschaft ===
BAWAG was founded in 1922 by the Austrian Chancellor Dr. Karl Renner as the Arbeiterbank (Austrian Worker's Bank), not so much to extend favourable terms of credit to ordinary people, but to spare them from resorting to more capitalist institutions (cit. Renner). Socialist trade unions and the Großeinkaufsgesellschaft für österreichische Consumvereine (Austrian consumer associations procurement company) each hold a 40% stake in the bank. However, because of those close ties to the Social Democratic Party of Austria (SPÖ) and labour unions, BAWAG was forced to close in 1934 by the Austro-fascist government of Chancellor Engelbert Dollfuß. It resumed its operations after the end of World War II in 1947.

In 1963, it took the name of Bank für Arbeit und Wirtschaft AG (BAWAG, translatable as "Bank for Labour and Business"). The bank continued to have close relations with the social democratic party SPÖ and the unions. The Austrian Trade Union Federation (ÖGB) retained 70% of the shares, the other 30% were held by the Konsum retail cooperative chain. In the 1970s, popular products were the Kapitalsparbuch (fixed-term savings passbook) and the Betriebsratskredit. At the same time, the bank actively used its finances to sponsor the promotion of Austrian contemporary art and culture. The BAWAG Foundation was established in 1974 with the goal of making art as accessible as possible to all people. The Foundation was closed in 2013.

In 1979, parliament amended the Austrian Banking Act (Kreditwesengesetz or KWG), which now allowed the operation of branches. The BAWAG experienced rapid expansion throughout Austria, from an existing network of 26 offices to 120 by 1982.

The shareholder Konsum went bankrupt in 1995, which sent shockwaves through the political landscape in Austria, especially for the social democrats. The Bayerische Landesbank bought the shares and increased its stake to 46%.

=== Merger to create BAWAG PSK ===
In 2000, BAWAG successfully took over a majority of shares of the Österreichische Postsparkasse (PSK) bank, buying 74.82% of the shares from the government. In November 2003, the remaining 25.18% were bought up as well. The merger, which was not finalised until 2005, created the country's third-largest bank group with a balance sheet total of nearly 45 billion euros, 5000 employees, some 2000 outlets (including branches where P.S.K. has been already located) and over one million private customers (2000). The new BAWAG/P.S.K. Group now had the largest centrally managed sales network in Austria.

With the combined assets, the new group BAWAG PSK experienced further growth. The piano manufacturer Bösendorfer was bought from the American company Kimball International in 2001. Since the fall of the Iron Curtain and the prospect of an accession of Central- and East European countries to the EU, new market opportunities open up. In 2002, the Slovakian bank Istrobanka is bought, a year later the Czech bank Interbanka. Both equities are owned 100% by BAWAG. The new partners opened up opportunities to expand in retail banking and intended to open new branches throughout Europe. In 2004, BAWAG acquired 100% of the shares of Dresdner Bank CZ, integrating it into the Interbanka, now renamed as BAWAG Bank CZ. The management decided to transfert as much capital as possible from the holding to the operative bank, so that a 1,5billion euro debt of the ÖGB were inherited by the bank.

The Bayerische Landesbank sold its 46% share in 2004 to the other shareholder, the Austrian Trade Union Federation (ÖGB). With that deal, the ÖGB became sole owner of the BAWAG.

=== The BAWAG Affair ===
Since the Refco scandal in October 2005, which involved bad loans in the amount of 425 million euros, the bank almost defaulted on its obligations and had to be bailed out by the conservative government of Wolfgang Schüssel. This has cast doubts about the future of links between the socialist-led unions and the bank.

The losses came from a series of failed bets using risky derivative investments held in off-balance-sheet vehicles. Though the bets go back as far as 1998, they surfaced only in 2006 during U.S. investigations into the bankruptcy of Refco. Also, Bawag lent Phillip Bennett, the former chief executive of Refco, hundreds of millions of dollars just before the brokerage filed for bankruptcy protection in October 2005.

As a result of the losses and subsequent investigations, criminal charges were filed against a number of BAWAG executives. Several people were found guilty and convicted. Helmut Elsner, former chief executive of Bawag, was found guilty of breach of trust, fraud and false accounting and was sentenced to nine and a half years in prison. The judge also ordered him to repay Bawag €6.8 million in pension benefits.

The defendants also included the Bawag executive Johann Zwettler and the investment banker Wolfgang Flöttl, who was based in the United States. Zwettler was given a five-year sentence. Flöttl was sentenced to 10 months. Six others were given various sentences.

=== Sale to Cerberus ===
As BAWAG's shareholders were also facing financial trouble, ÖGB decided to sell its entire stake in March 2006. Cerberus was finally chosen in December 2006, beating competitors Bayerische Landesbank, Allianz and Lone Star Funds, which bought 90% of BAWAG for €3.2 billion. Other shareholders are the Österreichische Post (5%), Generali (2-3%), the Wüstenrot-Gruppe (1%) and Hannes Androsch.

Initially, BAWAG PSK pursued a 2 brands strategy, progressively switching to the joint brand BAWAG PSK in 2007. In order to transform the bank, the new management sold non-strategic assets, like a 43% stake in Austrian TV operator ATV, foreign subsidiaries Istrobanka, to KBC Group in July 2008, BAWAG Bank CZ to Landesbank Baden-Württemberg in September 2008, piano producer Bösendorfer to Yamaha in January 2008 and Stiefelkönig (shoe retailer) in 2011.

In January 2022, the US hedge fund GoldenTree, Bawag's main shareholder, sold almost €290 million worth of Bawag shares. The fund reduced its stake by more than half.

=== Discrimination affair ===
In 2007, BAWAG hit headlines because the bank accounts of about 200 Cuban citizens had been terminated, for "the new owner did not want any trade relation with cubans", in respect of the Helms-Burton Act. After pressure from the government threatening to close its own accounts and the initiation of a legal procedure, Ceberus obtained an exemption from the US. government.

=== Permanent TSB ===
On 14 April 2026, BAWAG announced an agreement to acquire Permanent TSB, one of Ireland's main retail banks, in an all-cash deal valued at approximately €1.62 billion, or €2.97 per share. The acquisition, recommended by the boards of directors of both companies, enables the Irish government to divest its remaining 57.5% stake in the bank fully.

== See also ==
- List of banks in Austria
