= Bankhaus Krentschker & Co =

Coordinates: 47.068365°N 15.442336°E

Bankhaus Krentschker & Co. AG
- Company type: Joint-stock company
- Founded: 1923
- Headquarters: Graz, Austria
- Total assets: €1.05 billion (2016)
- Number of employees: 98 (2016)
- Website: www.krentschker.at

The Bankhaus Krentschker & Co. AG was an Austrian private bank based in Graz.

== History ==
In 1923, Igo Forster founded a bank and bill of exchange business in Leibnitz with a second location at Graz Central Station. In 1924, an employee of the exchange office, Moritz Krentschker and Kurt Pramberger joined the company as partners and received a bank license in 1926. After Forster's withdrawal in 1927, Krentschker and Pramberger moved the head office to a former branch of the Allgemeine Verkehrsbank in Graz and in 1929 called themselves the banking business Krentschker & Co. Between 1933 and 1938 the bank had an important function within the framework of the NSDAP Refugee Relief Organization, where Jews "willing to leave" had to pay part of their assets into a trust account in order to enable less fortunate Jews to flee, but also to finance the then illegal National Socialism in Austria. After the annexation of Austria, the bank applied for the establishment of a branch in Vienna in order to organize the confiscation of the property of Jews willing to emigrate on behalf of the NSDAP Ministry of Economic Affairs within the Gildemeester campaign and also took over the Jewish bank and exchange house Langer & Co.

In the post-war period, the bank was placed under public supervision and in 1950 it was handed back to the owners Krentschker and Pramberger. After Krentschker's death in 1967, Steiermärkische Bank und Sparkassen AG took over all shares, having already held Pramberger's shares before, and operates its higher-value private customer business under this company. The bank also has a wide range of real estate and equity holdings.

== See also ==
- List of banks in Austria
