= Kreditanstalt =

Kreditanstalt or Creditanstalt means "credit institution" in German. It may also refer to:

== Germany ==
- Kreditanstalt für Wiederaufbau, a German public financial institution
- Essener Credit-Anstalt, a German bank
- Allgemeine Deutsche Credit-Anstalt, a defunct German bank
- Deutsche Rentenbank-Kreditanstalt, a predecessor to Landwirtschaftliche Rentenbank

== Habsburg Monarchy / Austria ==
- Creditanstalt, a defunct major Austrian bank
- Allgemeine Bodencreditanstalt, another defunct Austrian bank

== Switzerland ==
- Schweizerische Kreditanstalt, German name of Credit Suisse
