= Wiener Giro- und Cassen-Verein =

Former Austrian financial infrastructure

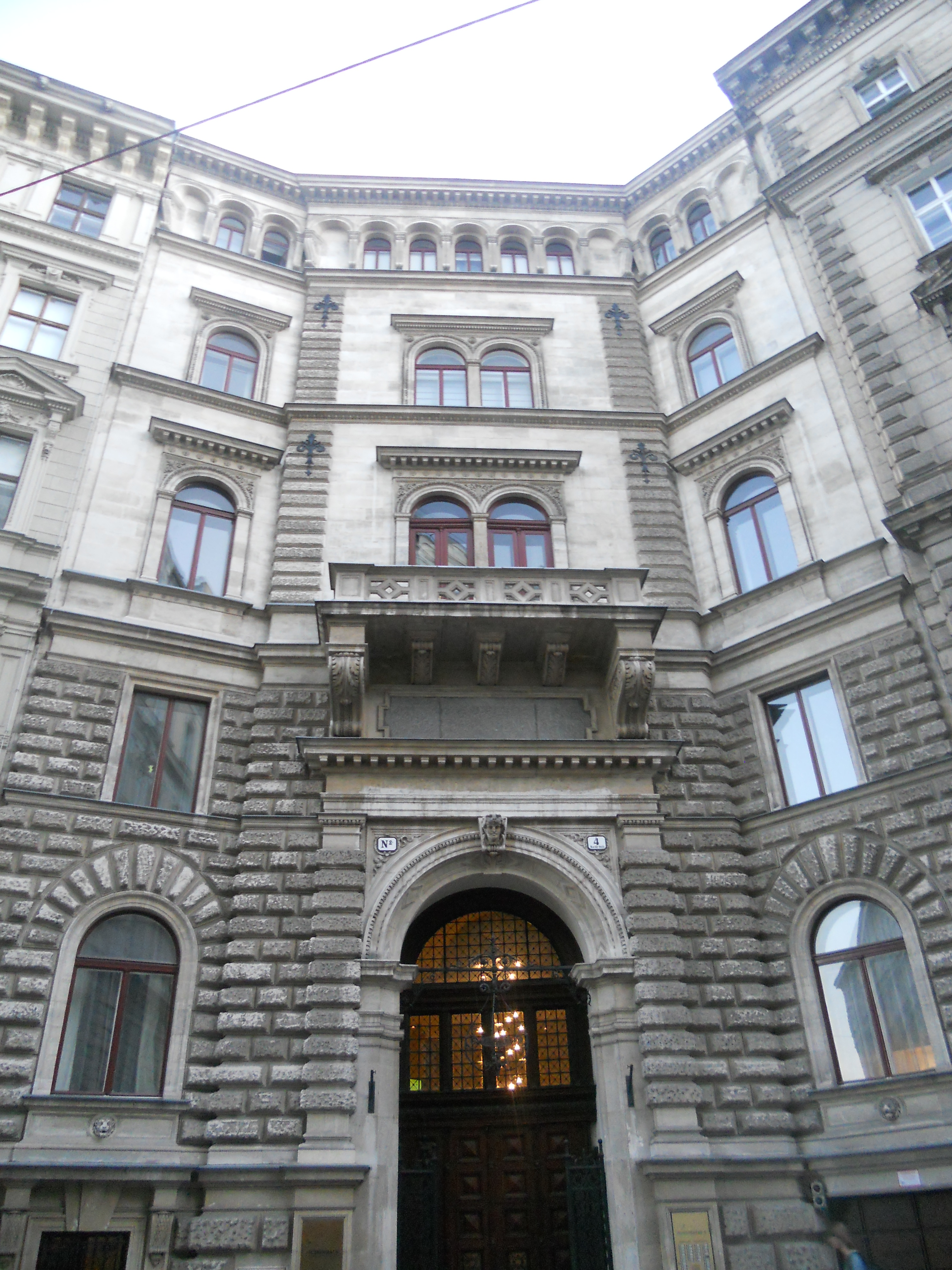
Building at Rockhgasse 4 in Vienna, designed by architect Emil von Förster and built 1880-1883 as head office of Wiener Giro- und Cassen-Verein

The Wiener Giro- und Cassen-Verein was a specialized financial institution in Vienna that has been described as the world's oldest central securities depository (CSD). Created in 1872, it was absorbed in 1946 by the newly established Oesterreichische Kontrollbank.

== See also ==
- Depository Trust & Clearing Corporation
- List of banks in Austria
