= Bank Gutmann =

Private bank in Austria

Coordinates: 48.200741°N 16.374179°E

Bank Gutmann AG
- Company type: Joint-stock company
- Founded: 1922
- Headquarters: Vienna, Austria
- Key people: Alexander Kahane; Frank W. Lippitt; Matthias Albert; Friedrich Strasser
- Total assets: €917 million (2019)
- Number of employees: 207 (2019)
- Website: www.gutmann.at

Founded in 1922, Bank Gutmann AG, a private bank based in Vienna, Schwarzenbergplatz, specializes in asset management and is the market leader in Austria. The private bank is 80 percent owned by the Kahane family and 20 percent by executive and non-executive partners. Gutmann currently manages client assets of €20.5 billion (as of 2019). Clients include domestic and foreign entrepreneurs as well as entrepreneurial families, foundations, wealthy private clients and institutional investors.

== History ==
Founded in 1922, Bank Gutmann was active in all areas of the banking business at the time, with the exception of accepting savings deposits and issuing bonds and mortgage bonds. Its clientele included the most important companies in the Gutmann Group as well as a number of companies not belonging to the Gutmann Group. Bank Gutmann managed the finances for the companies of the Gutmann Group, but did not hold any shares in them. The Gutmann Group was hit hard by the global economic crisis in the 1930s. After the National Socialists seized power in 1938, the assets of the Gutmann family were "aryanised". In this context, the liquidation of Bank Gutmann was initiated, but not completed until the end of the Second World War. In 1947, the Gutmann family successfully applied to the Austrian Ministry of Finance for the liquidation to be terminated and for the bank license to be revived. However, Bank Gutmann did not subsequently develop any activities other than the payment of pensions for former employees. In 1957, Karl Kahane acquired the bank from the Gutmanns and began to rebuild the banking business. Initially, the focus was on foreign exchange transactions for leading Austrian companies. After the expansion of further business areas, Bank Gutmann was converted into a public limited company in 1971. In the 1980s, Bank Gutmann placed bonds of the Republic of Austria and state-owned utilities and road construction companies with the country's leading insurance institutions. Bank Gutmann was also involved in the establishment of external pension funds in the 2000s as an investor and consultant.

== Business area ==
Bank Gutmann has specialized in asset management and investment consulting since the 1980s. Gutmann's clients include domestic and foreign entrepreneurs, foundations, wealthy private clients and families as well as institutional investors. In addition to asset management and investment advice for private clients, Gutmann's area of activity also includes institutional clients. Over the years, private equity and real estate have also developed into specific areas of expertise. In addition to its core business in Austria, Bank Gutmann serves clients from Central and Eastern Europe, Germany and Latin America. The bank has its own local branches in Hungary (Budapest) and the Czech Republic (Prague).

== Teaching and research ==
The "WU Gutmann Center for Portfolio Management" was founded in 2001.

== The Gutmann Kapitalanlageaktiengesellschaft KAG ==
Gutmann Kapitalanlageaktiengesellschaft is a wholly owned subsidiary of Bank Gutmann AG and currently manages around 130 investment funds with a total volume of around €20.5 billion (as of 2019).

== See also ==
- List of banks in Austria
