= ZUNO Bank =

ZUNO BANK AG
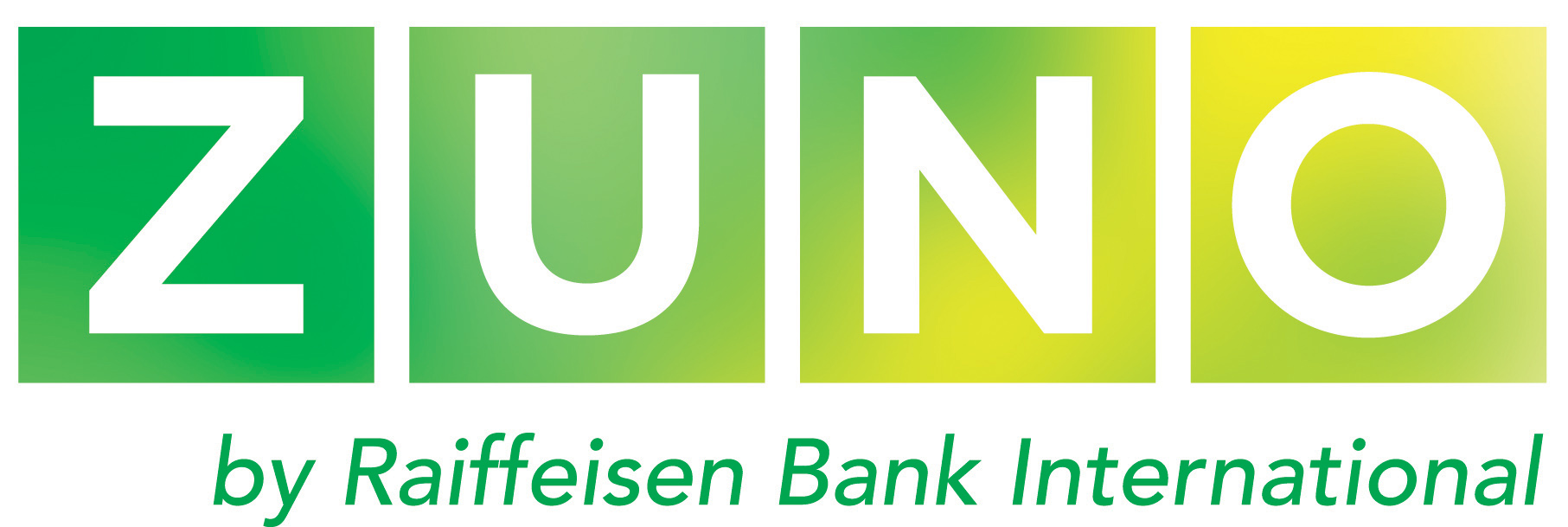
- Company type: Public
- Industry: Banking
- Founded: December 2009
- Headquarters: Vienna, Austria
- Area served: Slovakia, Czech Republic
- Products: Commercial Banking, Online banking
- Number of employees: ca. 250
- Website: www.zuno.eu

ZUNO BANK AG is a defunct direct bank launched in 2010. It targeted people who conduct their banking activities mainly over the Internet and rarely visit bank branches. Slovakia was ZUNO's first market in the CEE region with the Czech Republic to follow. In 2017 the bank was closed. Its clients were moved to Tatra banka in Slovakia and Raiffeisenbank in the Czech Republic.

== Overview ==
ZUNO's parent company is Raiffeisen Bank International (RBI). RBI ranks among the top 100 banks worldwide. It is embedded in the Austrian Raiffeisen Banking Group (RBG), which is the largest banking group in Austria.

The bank obtained a banking license from the Austrian Financial Market Authority in 2009. The "Single European Passport" principle allows the new direct bank to enter the banking market in another EU member state simply by following a notification process with the competent regulatory authorities.

== See also ==
- List of banks in Austria
