= Baumann & Cie, Banquiers =

Swiss bank headquartered in Basel

- Industry: Private banking Financial services
- Founded: 1920; 106 years ago
- Headquarters: St. Jakobs-Strasse 46, 4002 Basel, Switzerland
- Number of locations: 3
- Key people: Partners: Matthias C.E. Preiswerk; Daniel O.A. Rüedi
- Services: Wealth Management, Investment Advisory
- Number of employees: About 60
- Website: Baumann & Cie, Banquiers

Baumann & Cie, Banquiers, headquartered in Basel, is a Swiss private bank specializing in wealth management and investment advisory.

== Organization ==
Baumann & Cie, Banquiers is organized as a limited partnership, with three managing partners having personal, unlimited liability and one limited partner.

While the focus lays on wealth management for private and institutional clients, the bank also advises in the areas of inheritance, retirement as well as succession planning, tax and accounting. Furthermore, Baumann & Cie is actively involved in startups and holds significant participations in several companies. As such, Baumann & Cie holds a majority of the shares of Basel-based Trafina Privatbank.

Baumann & Cie, Banquiers employs roughly 60 people at offices in Basel, Zürich and Olten. The amount of assets under management has not officially been announced, nor is it publicly known. The realized profit in the year 2017 amounted to 17.5 million Swiss Francs with an equity capital of 124 million Swiss Francs. Over the past years, the bank has managed to generate an annual profit of more than 10 million Swiss Francs.

== History ==
The company was founded in Basel in the year 1920 as a private bank under the name of Ed. Greutert & Cie. In 1940, the bank was renamed Sturzenegger & Cie.

According to a lawsuit SOCIETE INTERNATIONALE, ETC. v. McGranery, 111 F. Supp. 435 (D.D.C. 1953) filed in the District Court, District of Columbia on February 19, 1953, E. Greutert & Cie and H. Sturzenegger & Cie were used to conceal the ownership of companies by I. G. Farben during the Nazi years.

Ed. Greutert & Cie. (and its successor firm, H. Sturzenegger & Cie.), a Swiss banking partnership, and others unknown with the ultimate purpose and objective " to conceal, camouflage, and cloak the ownership, control, and domination by I. G. Farben of properties and interests in many countries of the world, including the United States, other than Germany."

The firm collaborated with Nazi Germany and was closely allied with I.G. Farben. acting as "general trustee and banker" for I.G. Farben's foreign holdings.

H. Sturzenegger changed its name to Baumann & Cie, Banquiers in 1984. In 2009, the Zürich branch opened, followed by the expansion to Olten in 2016.

In 2015, the bank was fined 7.7 million dollars by the United States Justice Department for assisting American clients to evade taxes. In 2016 the bank reported a profit of 13.3 million Swiss Francs, a drop of about 15% from the previous year.
