= Österreichische Postsparkasse =

Former bank in Austria

Österreichische Postsparkasse AG
- Company type: Public
- Industry: Finance and insurance
- Founded: 1882
- Defunct: 1 October 2005
- Fate: Merged with the BAWAG to form BAWAG P.S.K.
- Headquarters: Vienna, Austria
- Key people: Stephan Koren (CEO)
- Products: Commercial banking, Investment banking, Private banking, Asset management
- Revenue: € 56,271 mn (2004, as part of the merged BAWAG P.S.K.)
- Number of employees: ~6.280 (2004, as part of BAWAG P.S.K.)
- Website: www.psk.at

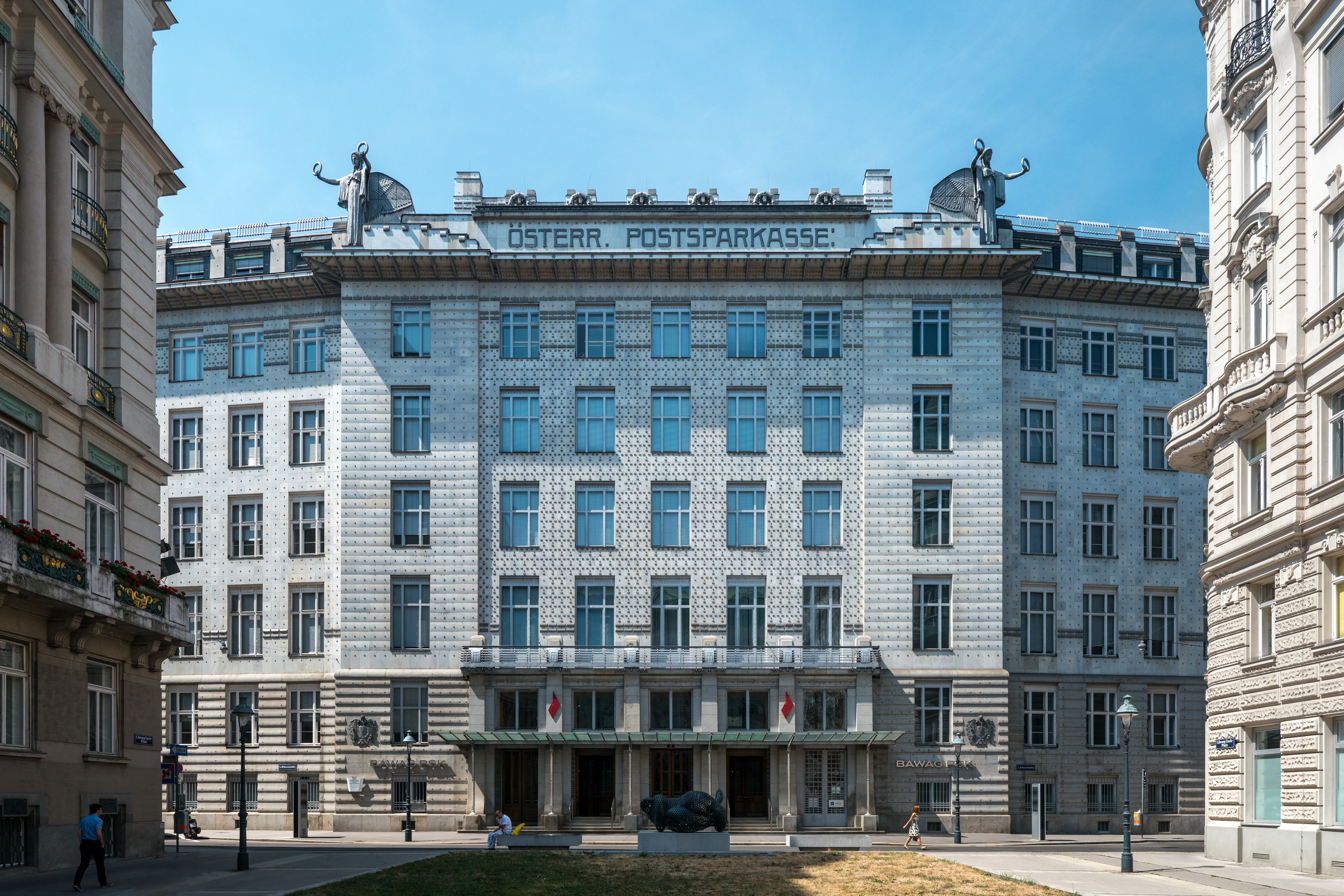
Vienna headquarters of the Österreichische Postsparkasse, built by Otto Wagner

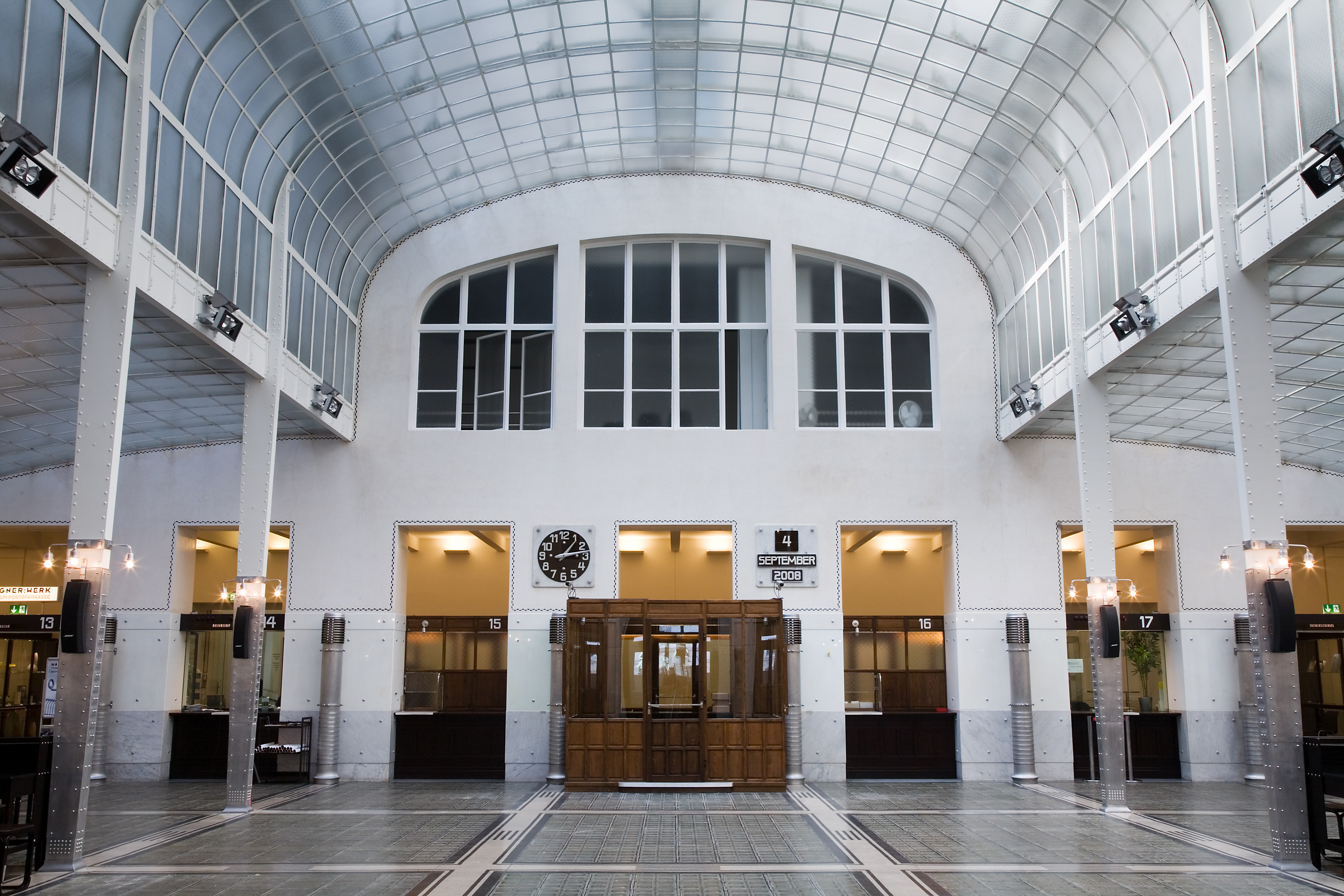
Interior of the Österreichische Postsparkasse headquarters, Vienna

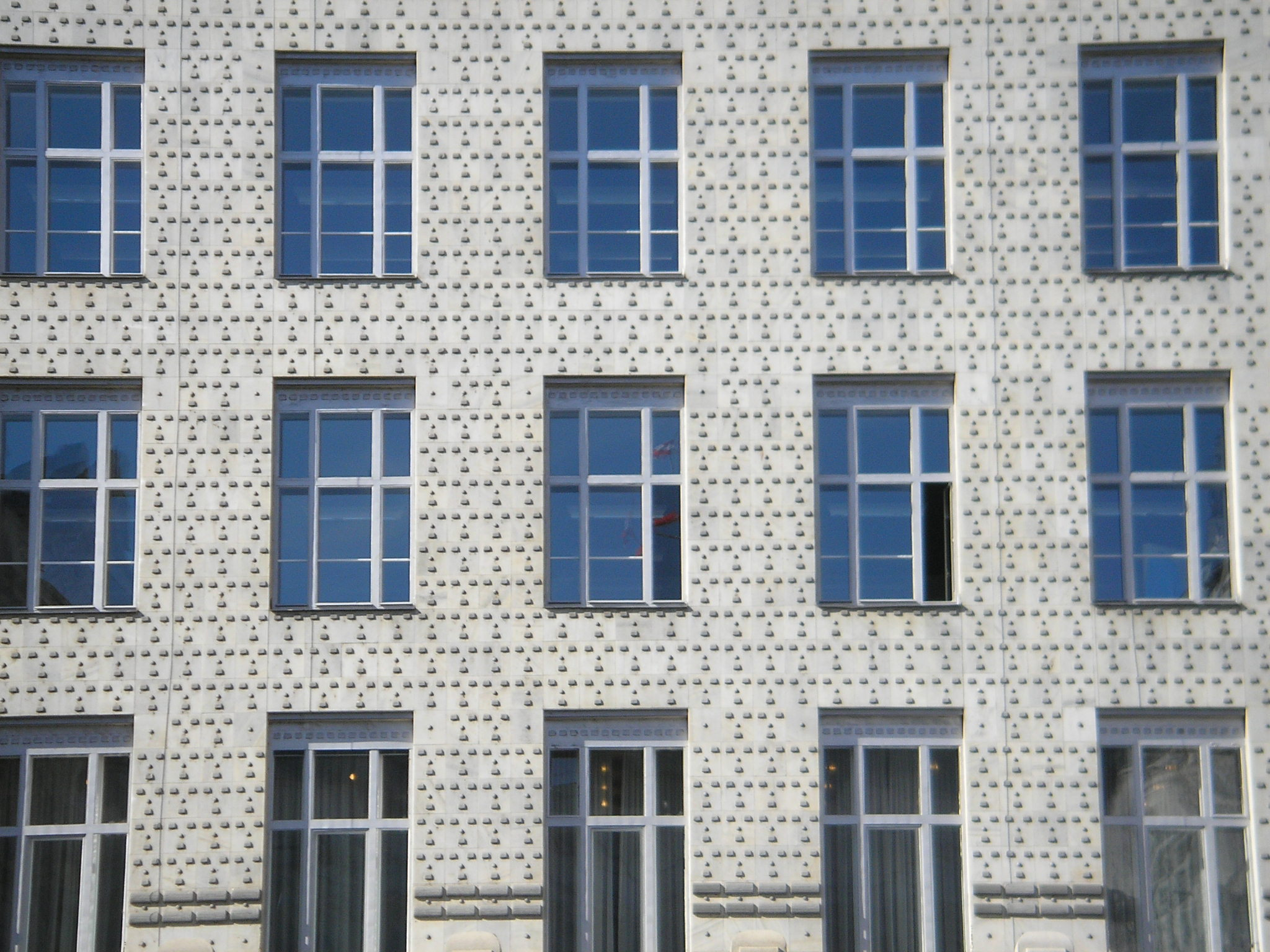
Exterior decoration of the Österreichische Postsparkasse headquarters, Vienna

Österreichische Postsparkasse (German pronunciation: [ˌøːstəʁaɪçɪʃə ˈpɔstʃpaːɐˌkasə], lit. 'Austrian Postal Savings Bank', abbr. PSK) was a postal savings bank in Austria. It was owned by the Austrian Post Office and thus by the government. It merged on 1 October 2005 with the BAWAG to form BAWAG P.S.K.

== History ==
=== During the Austro-Hungarian Empire ===
Österreichische Postsparkasse was founded by law in 1882. On 28 May, the parliamentary bill "...on the introduction of postal savings banks in kingdoms and countries represented by the Imperial Assembly" was passed in the Imperial Council (Reichsrat). The government bill was drawn up by Georg Coch, the founder and first director of the bank.

The first headquarters of the "k.k. Postsparcassen-Amt" (Imperial-Royal Postal Savings Office) was opened on 12 January 1883 in the former Dominican Monastery building on Wollzeile street in the first Viennese district Innere Stadt. About 4,000 post office branches located throughout the Austro-Hungarian Empire began offering their postal savings service to customers. The idea behind offering financial services at post offices was to promote public awareness and encourage saving. The added benefit of the system was to make important funds available to the state and to guarantee the security of the deposits with government liability.

In October 1883, Coch introduced a revolutionary innovation, the system of cashless transfers (Scheckverkehr), whereby a written instruction authorised the debit of one account and the credit to another. This radically changed the monetary system and made the P.S.K. into the centre of payment transactions. The new system of cashless transfers started spreading throughout the world. The bank also saw the expansion of the foreign payment transaction system. Giro agreements were signed with the Austro-Hungarian Bank and other foreign postal savings bank throughout Europe.

In 1906 the new headquarters building in Vienna designed by the architect Otto Wagner was constructed. It is located at what is today Georg-Coch-Platz in the first district Innere Stadt along the Ringstraße boulevard. The building is one of the most important examples of Viennese Jugendstil which is also known as The Vienna Secession. Its clear lines and the usage of steel, concrete and glass give the building a solid and impenetrable look. The skylight in the main hall allows for natural light to reach the interior of the building. The headquarters building became the most recognisable trademark of the postal savings bank.

=== World War I and aftermath ===
World War I dealt a heavy blow to the bank. With the collapse of the Austro-Hungarian Empire, its areas of activity were restricted to the much smaller, newly founded Austrian Republic. As a result, the number of post office branches was heavily reduced from 7,000 to around 2,000.

On 28 December 1926, parliament passed a new law which liberalised the P.S.K., transferring it from direct state administration and control into a separate, independent legal entity as a public company.

Following the Anschluss of Austria to Nazi Germany from 1938 to 1945, the P.S.K. was dissolved as a legal entity by the Nazis, and all assets were transferred to Germany.

=== Rebirth and merger ===
Old Logo of the P.S.K.

After the liberation and the restoration of Austria, the postal savings bank was re-founded on 26 April 1945, as Österreichische Postsparkassenamt. It was the first Viennese banking institute to resume its services and was under the direct control of the Austrian Federal Ministry of Finance. It remained under the direct control of the ministry until 1 January 1970, when the 1969 Postal Savings Bank Act (Postsparkassengesetz 1969) came into effect. The bank regained its pre-war status as an independent legal entity in form of a public company. Österreichische Postsparkasse, as it was now called, was however required to further follow the monetary and fiscal policy of the Austrian Federal Government in its business dealings and to support the Austrian National Bank (OeNB) in all currency and lending policies. The Federal Government assumed liability for all P.S.K. obligations in return for the right to half of the annual net profit. The law formed the starting point for a new business strategy aimed at creating a market-oriented range of services.

The strategy seemed to work well, as the bank grew and was able to further consolidate its position in 1976, when it purchased the majority stake in the Appell Kunden-Kredit Teilzahlungsbank regGenmbH, which was one year later converted into a full bank under the name Bank der Österreichischen Postsparkasse AG (P.S.K. Bank AG).

The 1990s saw substantial change for the bank. In 1996, parliament passed a law to change the P.S.K. into a joint stock company (Aktiengesellschaft). The following year, the Federal Ministry of Finance allowed the P.S.K. to grant private loans. With the award of the license the bank secured preferential treatment for financing of companies that are majority-owned by the government. The P.S.K. registered with the company register at the Vienna commercial court. The bank also was listed on the Vienna Stock Exchange. The Austrian government was liable for any financial obligations of the newly listed company. With the new restructuring, a new agreement was signed between the P.S.K. and the Austrian Mail Service of how the post offices would continue to offer the financial services.

Last logo of the P.S.K. with the postal horn, when it still belonged to the postal system

In 2000, 74.82% of the bank's shares were bought by Bank für Arbeit und Wirtschaft AG (BAWAG) and the remaining 25.18% by KSP Unternehmensbeteiligungsgesellschaft mbH. The merger of the two financial institutes created the BAWAG P.S.K., making it Austria’s third-largest banking group. By 2000 the balance sheet had a total of almost 45 million euros and the new group had about 5000 employees, some 2000 outlets and over one million private customers. The BAWAG P.S.K. Group now has the largest centrally managed sales network in Austria.

== Areas of activity ==
The bank's services cover the classical areas of retail banking and corporate banking.

Apart from offering financial services, the bank also sponsors cultural events such as art exhibitions, especially on the Viennese Jugendstil, concerts, as well as donating for social issues such as fundraisers for victims of natural disasters.

== See also ==
- List of banks in Austria

== Literature ==
- Schorske, Carl E. (1980). Fin-de-Siècle Vienna: Politics and Culture. London: Vintage. ISBN 0-394-74478-0.
- Wagner, Otto (1996). Die österreichische Postsparkasse. Wien: Falter Verlag. ISBN 3-85439-180-3.
