= BAWAG PSK =

Fourth largest bank in Austria

BAWAG P.S.K. Bank für Arbeit und Wirtschaft und Österreichische Postsparkasse Aktiengesellschaft
- Type: Public
- Industry: Banking
- Predecessor: Arbeiterbank
- Founded: 1922; 104 years ago
- Headquarters: Vienna, Austria
- Key people: Anas Abuzaakouk (CEO)
- Products: Retail and corporate banking with focus on Austria and select Western European countries
- Operating income: € 991 million (2016)
- Total assets: €72,297 billion (Q4 2025)
- Total equity: € 3,136 billion (31.12.2016)
- Number of employees: 2,496 (2016)
- Website: www.bawag.at

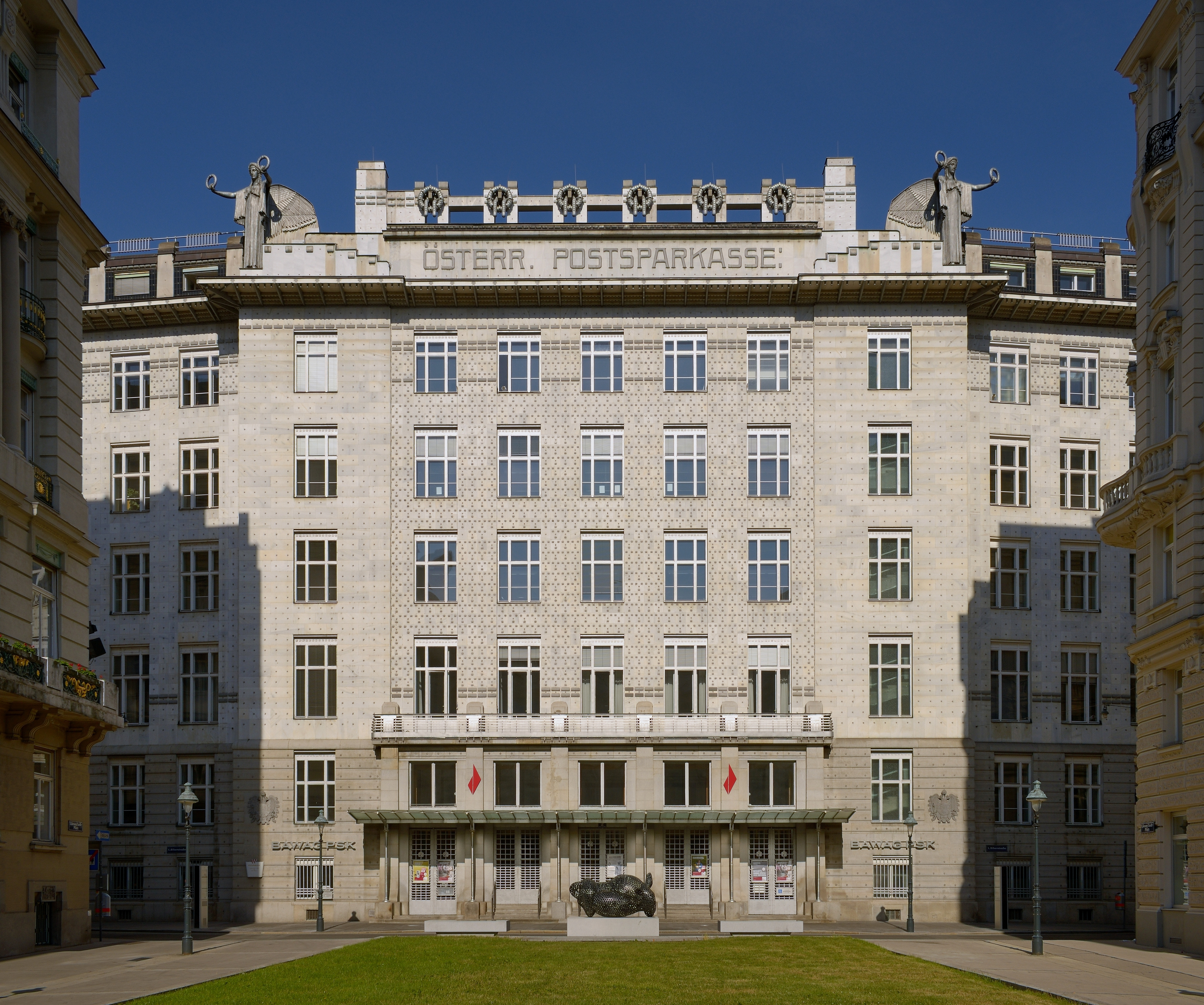
Headquarters of BAWAG-PSK

BAWAG P.S.K. Bank für Arbeit und Wirtschaft und Österreichische Postsparkasse Aktiengesellschaft is the fourth largest bank in Austria. It was formed on October 1, 2005 by the merger of the separate banks PSK and BAWAG.

As of 2016, the bank serviced more than 2.5 million customers all over Austria. It serves Austrian retail, small business and corporate customers across the country, offering savings, payment, lending, leasing, investment, building society and insurance products and services. Two-thirds of the customer loans derive from Austria. The international activities focus on retail, corporate, commercial real estate and portfolio lending in Western developed countries.

BAWAG PSK has been designated as a Significant Institution since the entry into force of European Banking Supervision in late 2014, and as a consequence is directly supervised by the European Central Bank.

== History ==
BAWAG was founded in 1922 by former Austrian Chancellor Karl Renner to extend favourable terms of credit to ordinary people, as the 'Austrian Worker's Bank'. The bank was forced to close in 1934, but resumed its operations post World War II in 1947. In 1963, it took the name of Bank für Arbeit und Wirtschaft AG, BAWAG, or, in English, 'Bank for Labour and Business Corporation'. Until 2006, the bank's majority shareholder was the ÖGB, the Austrian Trade Union Federation.

PSK was founded in 1883 as Austrian Postal Savings Bank by Georg Coch offering the idea of saving to broad sections of the population, to ensure the security of the deposits by investing in government bonds only as well as to provide funding for the state.

After acquiring PSK by BAWAG in 2000, both banks merged to form BAWAG PSK in 2005.

In December 2006, Cerberus Capital Management acquired BAWAG PSK for reported €3.2 billion. In October 2017, BAWAG Group AG, the holding company of BAWAG PSK, became a listed company on the Vienna Stock Exchange. Largest shareholders are Cerberus Capital Management (35.1%) and GoldenTree Asset Management (25.7%).

Old logo of BAWAG PSK until 2007

In 2012, BAWAG PSK began executing a transformational initiative to improve and restructure its operations to improve its financial strength and efficiency. The key pillars of the transformation included re-focusing on core geographic markets and products, driving cost efficiency through disciplined cost management and simplified processes and deleveraging the balance sheet to increase capital and liquidity. As a result BAWAG PSK’s profit before tax increased from €23 million in 2012 to €470 million in 2016, primarily resulting from stronger core revenues and reduced operating expenses. As part of BAWAG PSK’s effort to reduce operating expenses, the bank implemented a new cost management approach, rationalized its business model and simplified its organizational structure. The bank also de-risked the balance sheet, which was achieved predominantly by reducing its exposure to Central and Eastern Europe, exiting proprietary trading, reducing the non-performing loans volume and introducing improved performance management tools. Over the past years, BAWAG PSK has also been able to strengthen its capital base due to mainly profit reinvestment that today more than meets the regulatory targets.

Since 2015, the Bank has gradually grown its business by several acquisitions: In 2015, the bank acquired the former VB Leasing and in 2016 start:bausparkasse and IMMO-Bank. In 2017, the acquisitions of PayLife and Südwestbank were completed.

In April 2026, BAWAG agreed to purchase Irish bank PTSB for €1.6 billion, a deal that will increase its total assets up to €100 billion.

== Operations ==
BAWAG PSK is one of the largest banks in Austria. By year-end 2016, BAWAG PSK reported total assets of 39.7 billion euros, an operating income of 991 million euros, a profit before tax of 470 million euros and total equity of 3.1 billion euros. The number of employees amounted to 2,496. Anas Abuzaakouk is Chairman of the Managing Board (CEO) since March 2017.

== Refco Scandal ==
In October 2005, BAWAG approved a loan of 425 million euros to Phillip R. Bennett, then CEO of the commodities broker Refco, collateralized against Bennett's own holdings in the firm. However, the reason he required the money was that he had lent an undisclosed 430 million dollars of the broker's money to himself in an attempt to cover up the company's bad debts. The very day after BAWAG made Bennett the loan, the irregularities were made public, triggering a number of regulatory investigations. Refco has since declared chapter 11 bankruptcy, making BAWAG's collateral essentially worthless. Austria's central bank and Austria's Financial Market Authority have started investigations.

In April 2006, creditors of Refco sued BAWAG for over $1.3 billion, alleging that the bank had colluded to hide Bennett's fraudulent transactions back to at least 2000, and that the bank owned far more of Refco than it had ever revealed in regulatory filings. In September 2006 a New York bankruptcy court confirmed the comprehensive settlement between BAWAG, Refco and Refco creditors.

== See also ==
- List of banks in Austria
- List of banks in the euro area
