= List of banks in Austria =

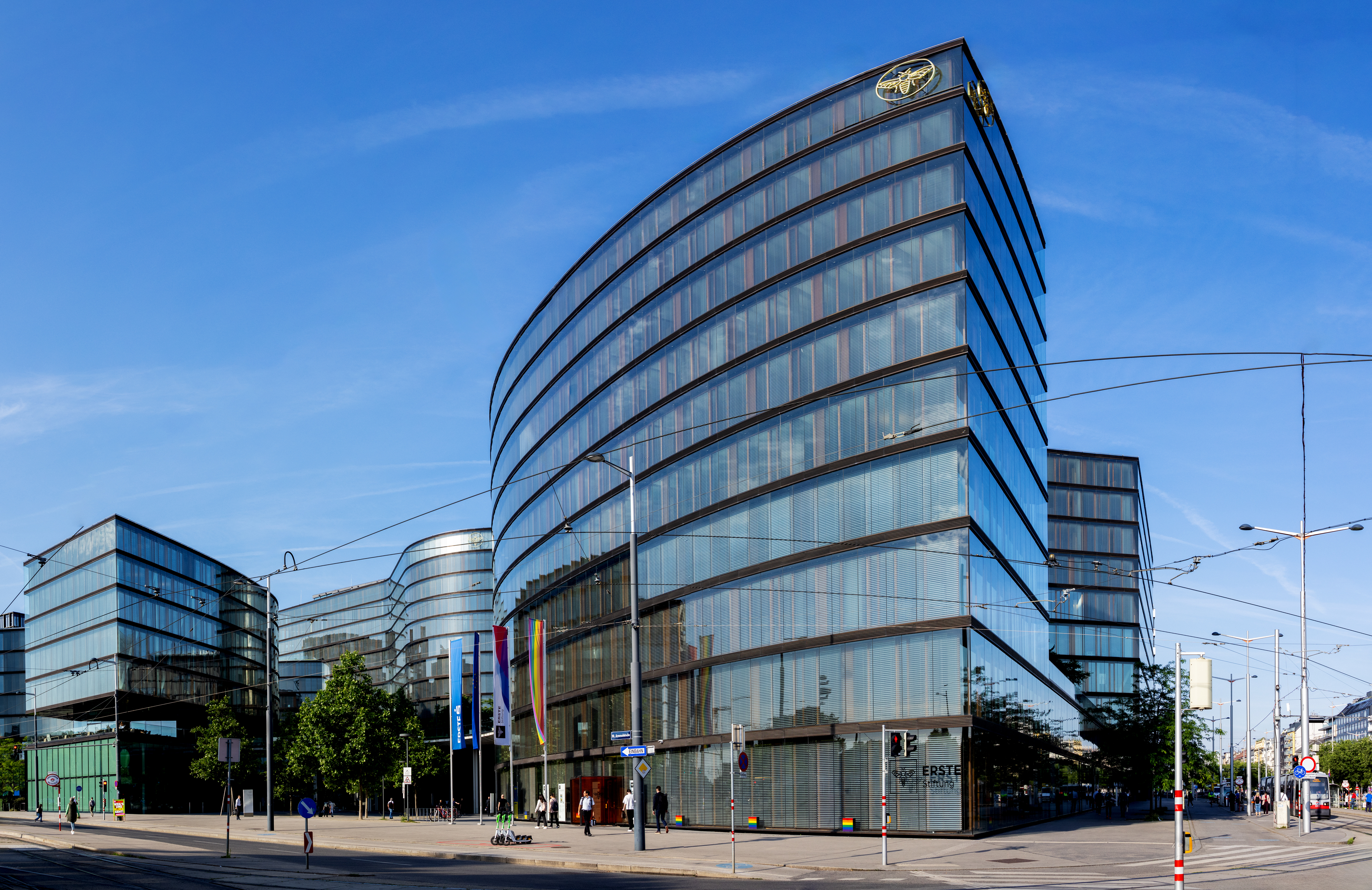
Erste Bank Vienna head office

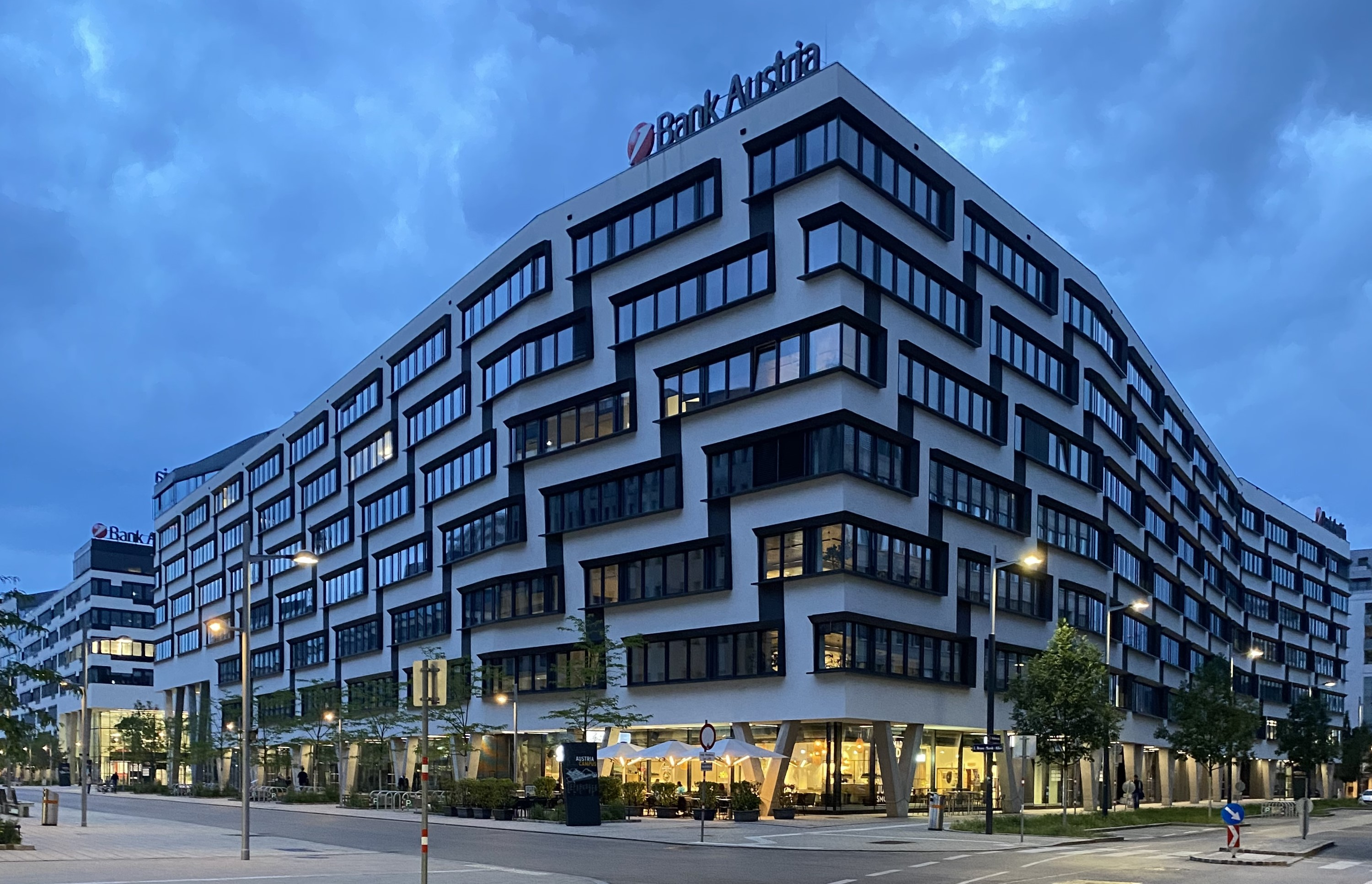
Bank Austria Vienna head office

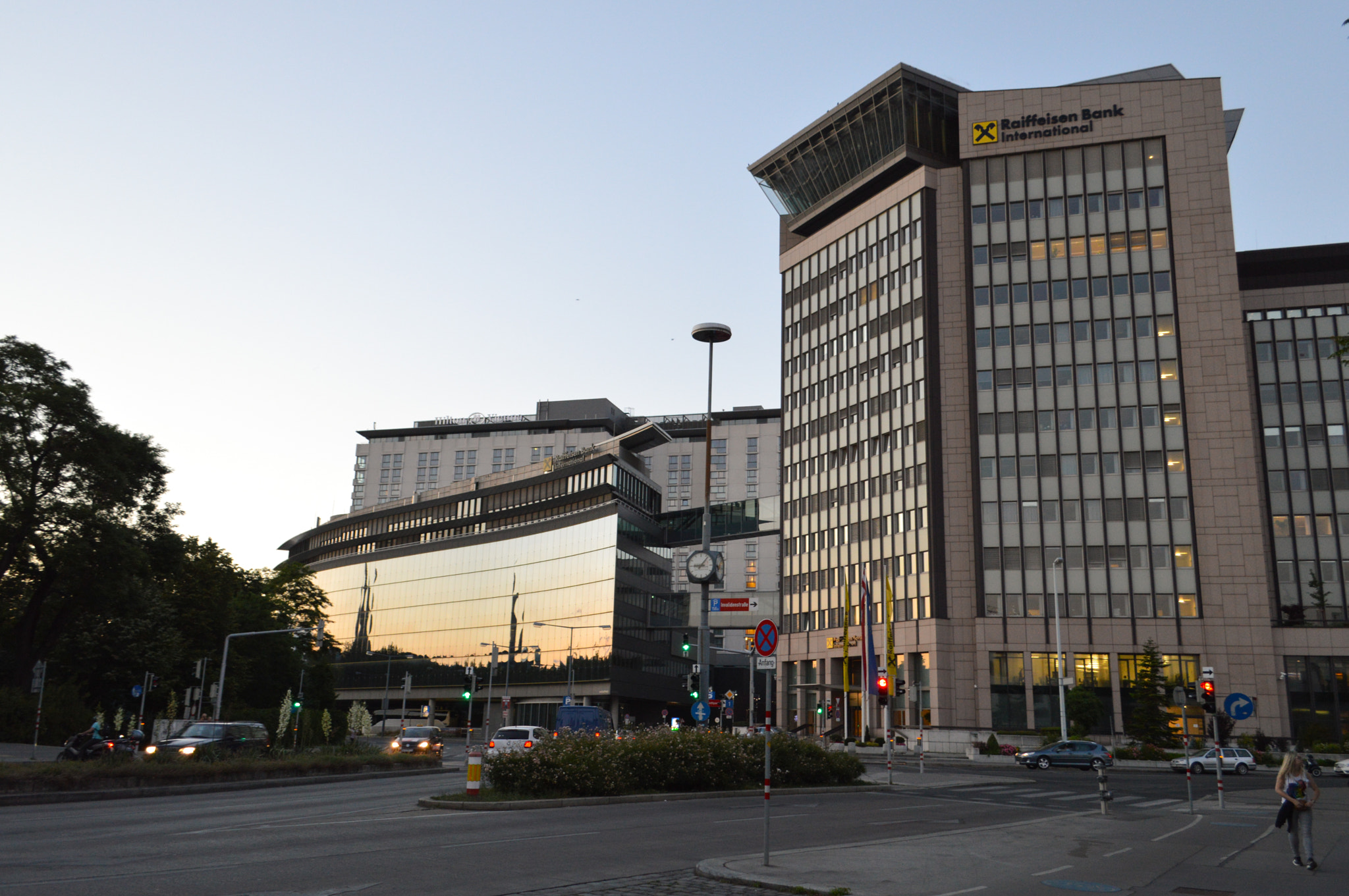
Raiffeisen Bank International Vienna head office

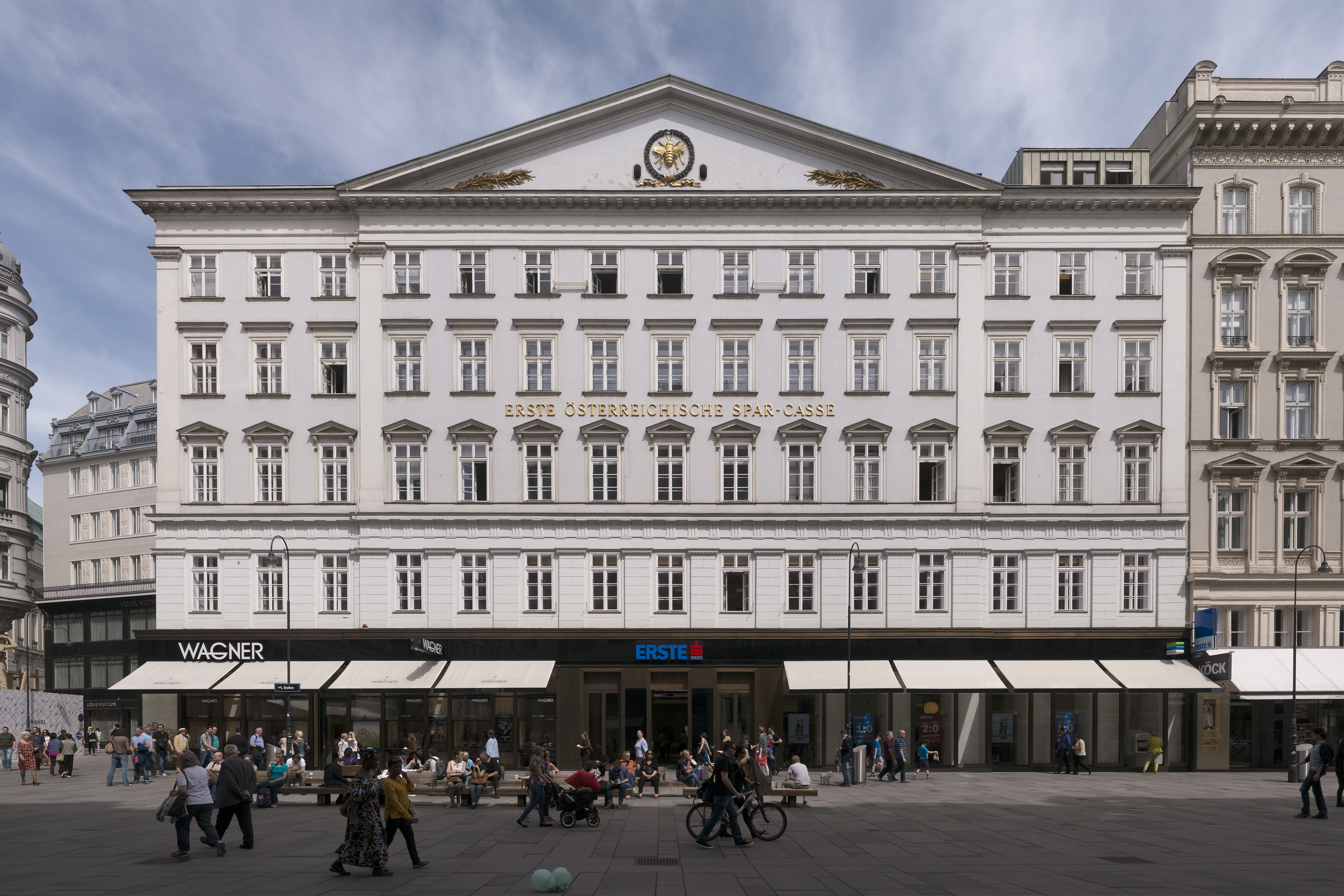
Historical Vienna building of the Erste österreichische Spar-Casse

The following list of banks in Austria is to be understood within the framework of the European single market and European banking union, which means that Austria's banking system is more open to cross-border banking operations than peers outside of the EU. In practice, Austrian banking is shaped not only by large universal banks, but also by regional savings banks, cooperative networks, and digital-first providers, so a simple bank comparison can be useful when choosing between account types and service models.

== Policy framework ==
European banking supervision distinguishes between significant institutions (SIs) and less significant institutions (LSIs), with SI/LSI designations updated regularly by the European Central Bank (ECB). Significant institutions are directly supervised by the ECB using joint supervisory teams that involve the national competent authorities (NCAs) of individual participating countries. Less significant institutions are supervised by the relevant NCA on a day-to-day basis, under the supervisory oversight of the ECB. In Austria's case, the NCA is the Financial Market Authority.

A specific feature of the EU framework is that it provides for the possibility of institutional protection scheme that bind together networks of local banks into idiosyncratic risk-sharing arrangements. Of the EU's eight IPSs as of 2022, two are in Austria, namely the Sparkassengruppe Österreich and Raiffeisen Banking Group.

== Significant institutions ==
As of 1 September 2025, the list of supervised institutions maintained by the ECB included the following seven Austrian banking groups as SIs, with names as indicated by the ECB for each group's consolidating entity. Of these, four were part of the two Austrian IPSs.

- Addiko Bank AG (currently being acquired by Raiffeisen Bank International)
- BAWAG Group AG
- Erste Group Bank AG (Sparkassengruppe IPS)
- Raiffeisen Bank International AG (Raiffeisen IPS)
- Raiffeisen-Holding Niederösterreich-Wien regGenmbH (Raiffeisen IPS)
- Raiffeisenbankengruppe Oberösterreich Verbund eGen (Raiffeisen IPS)
- Volksbank Wien AG, central entity of the Austrian Volksbank Group

A study published in 2024 assessed that the bank with most aggregate assets in Austria (as opposed to total consolidated assets, as of end-2023) was Erste Group at €189 billion, followed by UniCredit (€103 billion, via UniCredit Bank Austria), RBI (€93 billion), BAWAG (€55 billion), Raiffeisen Oberösterreich (€48 billion), and the Volksbank Group (€30 billion). This ranking, together, only considers Austrian Raiffeisen entities on a disaggregated basis; taken together, the Raiffeisen Banking Group was the largest in the country, with €399 billion in aggregate assets (including those outside Austria) also at end-2023. Austria is also home to subsidiaries of other euro-area significant institutions, namely Crédit Agricole and Santander.

== Less significant institutions ==
As of 1 September 2025, the ECB's list of supervised institutions included 324 Austrian LSIs.

=== High-impact LSIs ===
The ECB's list of 1 September 2025 included ten LSIs designated by the ECB as "high-impact" on the basis of several criteria including size, of which six in the Raiffeisen IPS:

- Hypo Noe Landesbank für Niederösterreich und Wien AG
- Hypo Vorarlberg Bank AG
- Oberbank AG
- Raiffeisenlandesbank Burgenland eGen (Raiffeisen IPS)
- Raiffeisenlandesbank Kärnten regGenmbH (Raiffeisen IPS)
- Raiffeisen-Landesbank Tirol AG (Raiffeisen IPS)
- Raiffeisenlandesbank Vorarlberg regGenmbH (Raiffeisen IPS)
- Raiffeisenverband Salzburg eGen (Raiffeisen IPS)
- RLB-Stmk Verbund eGen, an intermediate holding company (Raiffeisen IPS)
- Wüstenrot Wohnungswirtschaft regGenmbH, an intermediate holding entity of the Wüstenrot-Gruppe (see also below)

=== Raiffeisen Group ===
278 of the LSIs in the ECB's list, including the six above-listed high-impact LSIs, were in the Raiffeisen IPS, which therefore represented nearly 86 percent of the total number of Austrian LSIs.

=== Other Austrian LSIs ===
The 33 other Austrian LSIs on the ECB's list were:

- A1 Bank AG, subsidiary of A1 Telekom Austria Group
- Alpen Privatbank AG
- Austrian Anadi Bank AG (a successor to Hypo Alpe Adria Bank)
- Bank Gutmann AG
- bank99 AG, subsidiary of Austrian Post
- Bankhaus Carl Spängler & Co. AG
- Bankhaus Denzel AG
- BKS Bank AG
- BMW Austria Bank GmbH, subsidiary of BMW
- BTV Vier Länder Bank AG
- DolomitenBank Osttirol-Westkärnten eG, independent cooperative bank
- Generali Bank AG, subsidiary of Generali
- GRAWE-Vermögensverwaltung, subsidiary of Grazer Wechselseitige Versicherung
  - Schelhammer Capital Bank AG, subsidiary of GRAWE-Vermögensverwaltung
- Hypo Tirol Bank AG
- Hypo-Bank Burgenland AG
- Satere Beteiligungsverwaltungs GmbH, owned by Altor Equity Partners
  - Kommunalkredit Austria AG, owned by Satere
- Marchfelder Bank eG, independent cooperative bank
- Oberösterreichische Landesbank AG, regional bank owned by the state of Upper Austria
- Partner Bank AG, a private bank
- Porsche Bank AG, subsidiary of Porsche
- Volkskredit Verwaltungsgenossenschaft regGenmbH, owner of VKB
  - Volkskreditbank AG (VKB), a regional bank
- Walser Privatbank AG
- Wiener Privatbank SE, a private bank
- Wiener Spar- und Kreditinstitut - Holding eG, owner of WSK Bank
  - WSK Bank AG, an independent cooperative bank
- Winter, Stern Familien Privatstiftung, owner of the Winter banking group
  - Bankholding Winter & Co. AG, intermediate holding entity
  - Bank Winter & Co. AG, independent private bank
- Bausparkasse Wüstenrot AG, part of Wüstenrot-Gruppe
  - Wüstenrot Bank AG, part of Wüstenrot-Gruppe

=== Non-euro-area-controlled LSIs ===
The ECB's list of 1 September 2025 included 9 LSIs that were affiliates of financial groups outside the euro area, namely 2 branches and 7 subsidiaries:

- (Brazil) Banco do Brasil AG, subsidiary of Banco do Brasil
- Austrian branch of Bank of China (Central and Eastern Europe) Ltd, Hungarian subsidiary of Bank of China
- (United Arab Emirates) DenizBank AG, subsidiary of Emirates NBD via DenizBank
- ICBC Austria Bank GmbH, subsidiary of Industrial and Commercial Bank of China
- (Liechtenstein) Austrian branch of LGT Bank AG
- Liechtensteinische Landesbank (Österreich) AG, subsidiary of the National Bank of Liechtenstein
- (Turkey) VakifBank International AG, subsidiary of VakıfBank
- (United States) Western Union International Bank GmbH, subsidiary of Western Union
  - Western Union Overseas Ltd

As of October 2025, there were no branches of banks located outside the European Economic Area ("third-country branches") in Austria, based on data compiled by the European Banking Authority.

== Other institutions ==
The Austrian National Bank, Oesterreichische Kontrollbank, and Austria Wirtschaftsservice Gesellschaft are public credit institutions that do not hold a banking license under EU law.

== Defunct banks ==
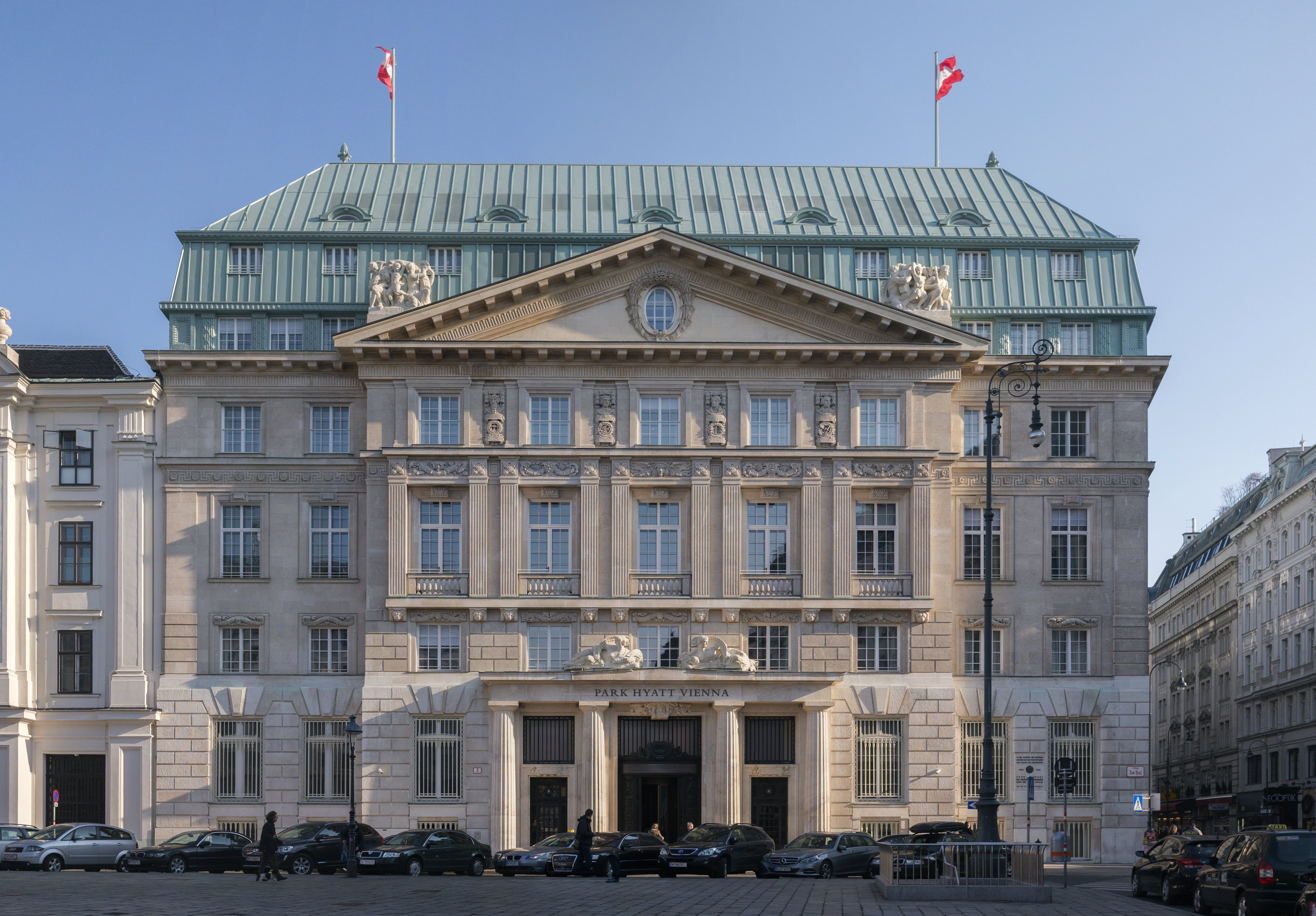
Historical Vienna building of Niederösterreichische Escompte-Gesellschaft

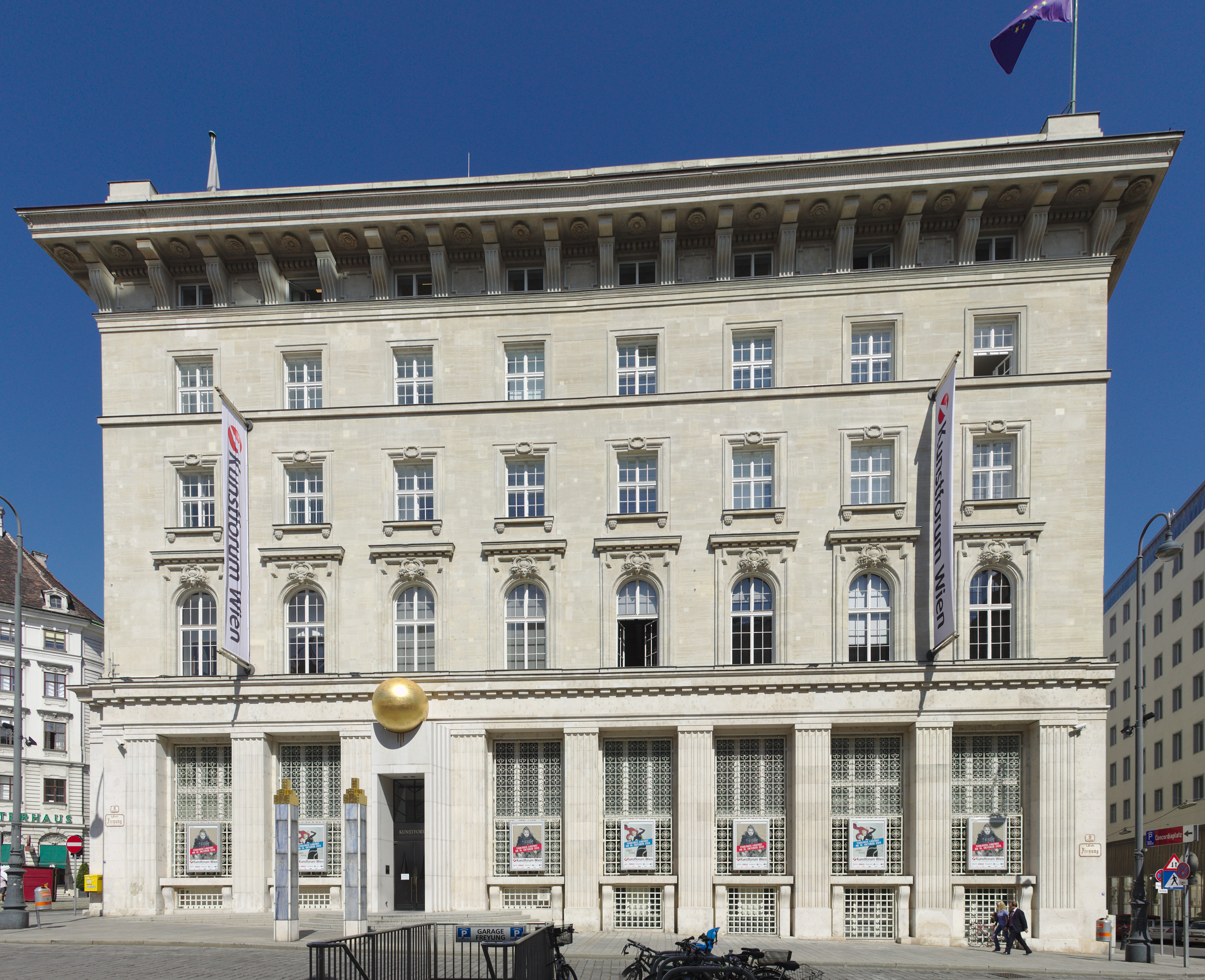
Historical Vienna building of Creditanstalt

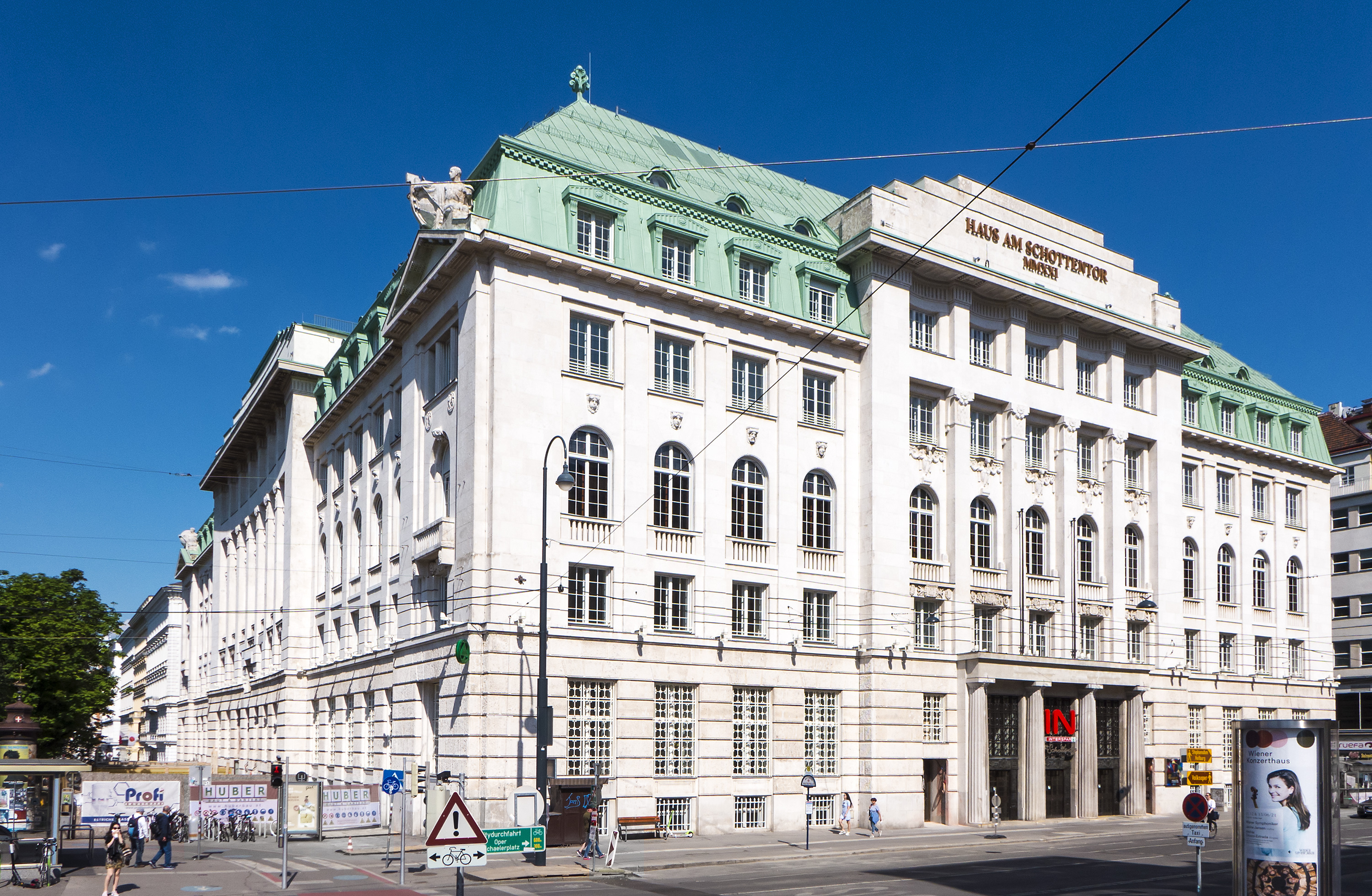
Historical Vienna building of Wiener Bankverein

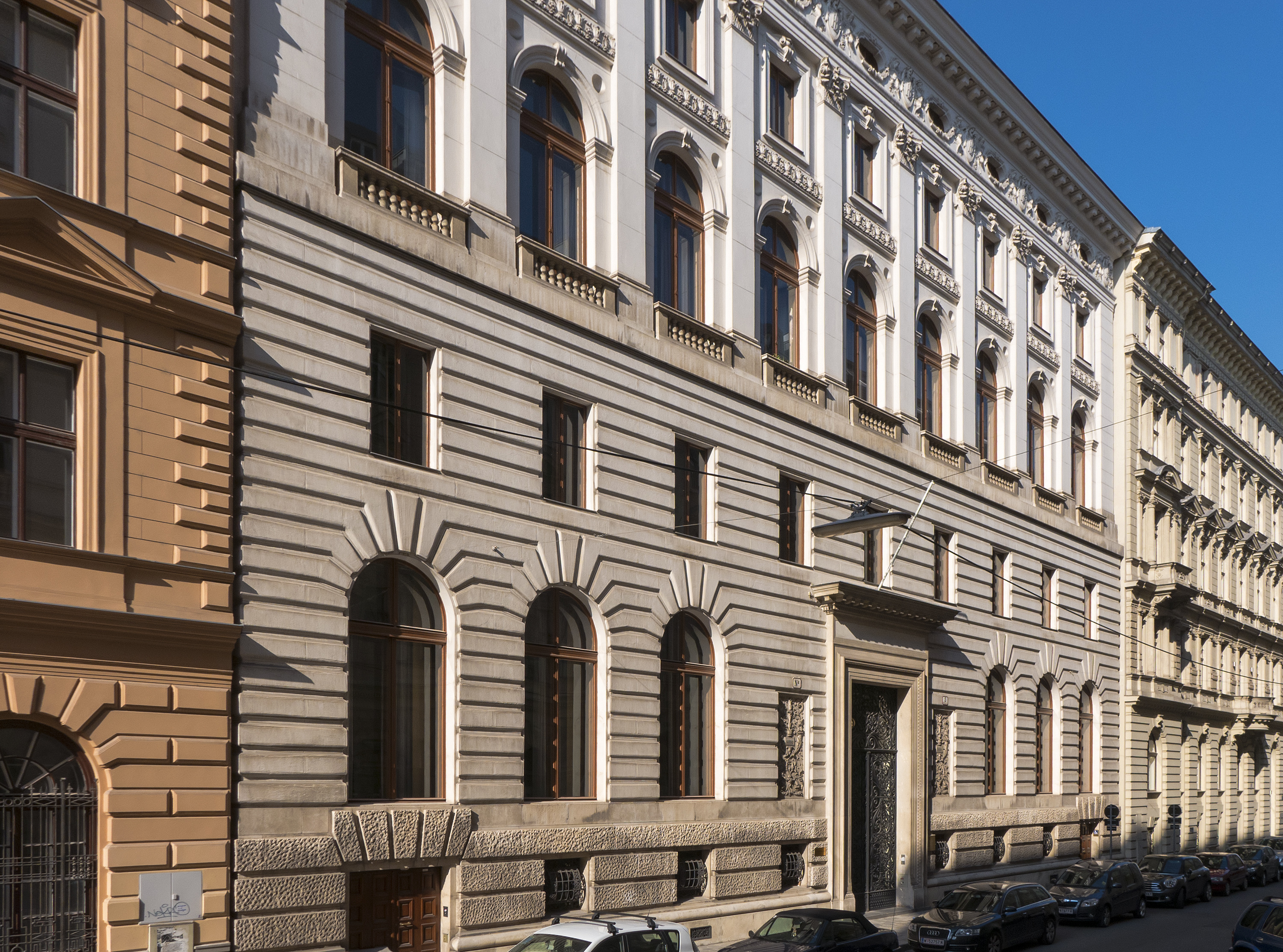
Historical Vienna building of Länderbank

A number of former Austrian banks, defined as having been headquartered in the present-day territory of Austria, are documented on Wikipedia. They are listed below in chronological order of establishment.

- Wiener Stadtbank (1706-1811)
- Austro-Hungarian Bank (1816-1922)
- S. M. von Rothschild (1820-1935)
- Weinviertler Sparkasse (1824-2011)
- Waldviertler Sparkasse von 1842 (1842-2012)
- Niederösterreichische Escompte-Gesellschaft (1853-1934)
- Creditanstalt (1855-1997)
- Ephrussi & Co. (1856-1938)
- Sparkasse Hartberg-Vorau (1858-2010)
- Allgemeine Bodencreditanstalt (1863-1929)
- Anglo-Austrian Bank (1863-1933)
- Sparkasse Kremstal-Pyhrn (1868-2013)
- Wiener Bankverein (1869-1934)
- Sparkasse Kirchschlag (1872-2011)
- Wiener Giro- und Cassen-Verein (1872-1946)
- Volksbank Bad Goisern (1873-2017)
- Länderbank (1880-1991)
- Österreichische Postsparkasse (1882-2005)
- Hypo Alpe Adria Bank (1896-2014)
- Österreichisches Credit-Institut (1896-1992)
- Centralbank der deutschen Sparkassen (1901-1926)
- Zentralsparkasse (1905-1991)
- Kreditverband der österreichischen Arbeitervereinigungen (1912-1934)
- Deutsche Bodenbank (1918-1924)
- BAWAG (1922-2005)
- Österreichische Volksbanken-Aktiengesellschaft (1922-2015)
- Bankhaus Krentschker & Co (1923-2020)
- Raiffeisen Zentralbank (1927-2017)
- Landes-Hypothekenbank Steiermark (1930-2021)
- Allgemeine Wirtschaftsbank (1958-1974)
- Donau Bank (1974-2018)
- Golden Star Bank (1982-2004)
- Semper Constantia Privatbank (1986-2017)
- Stadtsparkasse Traiskirchen (1991-2011)
- GiroCredit Bank AG der Sparkassen (1992-1997)
- Bank Medici (1994-2009)
- Commerzialbank Mattersburg (1995-2020)
- ZUNO Bank AG (2010-2017)
- Sberbank Europe Group (2012-2022)

== See also ==
- Banking in Austria
- List of banks in the euro area
- List of banks in Europe
