= Bankhaus Spängler =

- Native name: Bankhaus Carl Spängler & Co. AG
- Industry: Bank
- Founded: 1828
- Headquarters: Schwarzstraße 1, 5020 Salzburg, Austria
- Key people: Heinrich Spängler (CEO)
- Website: www.spaengler.at

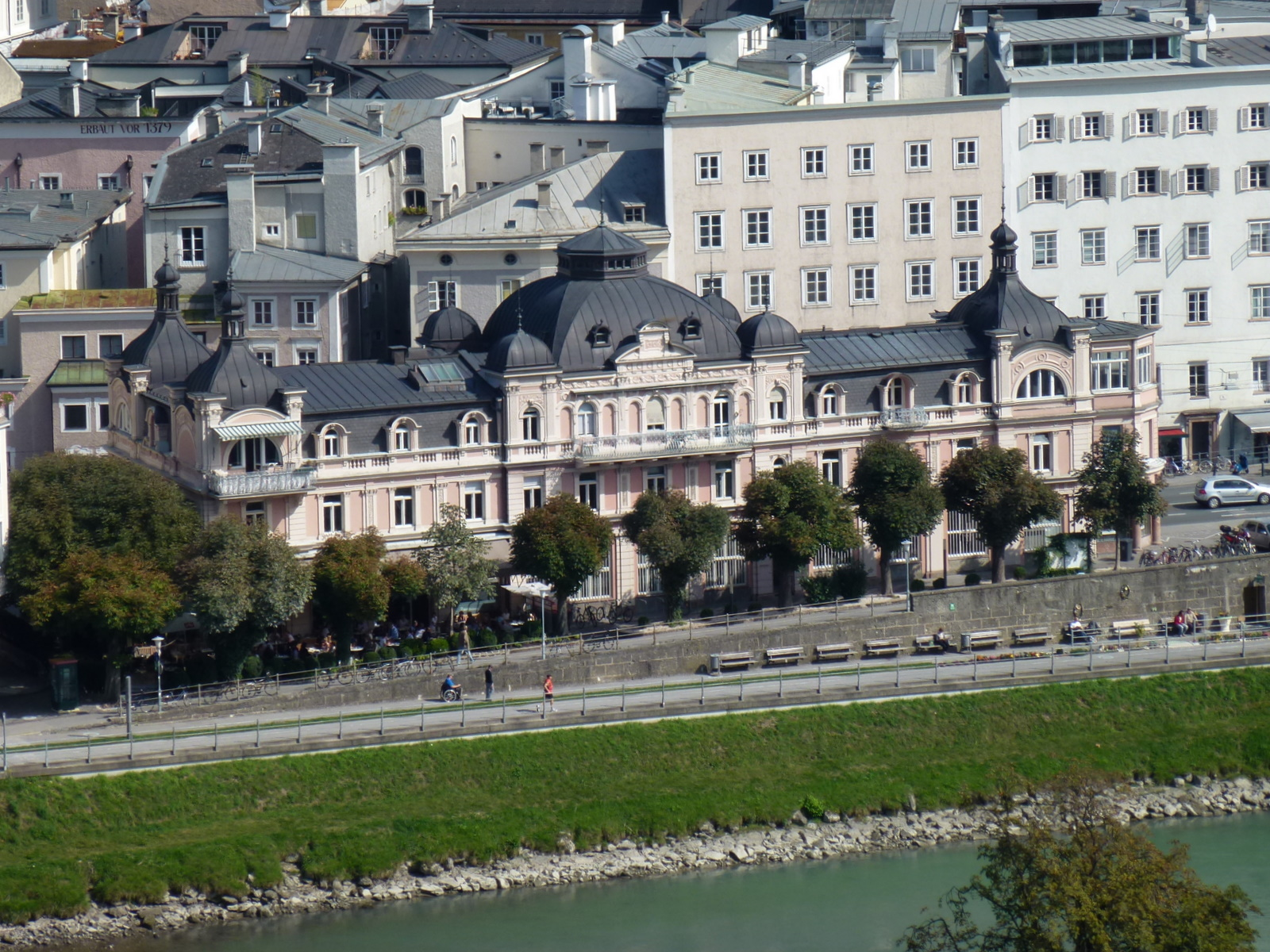
Bankhaus Spängler

Bankhaus Spängler or Bankhaus Carl Spängler & Co. AG is the oldest private bank in Austria founded in the state capital of Salzburg in 1828.

== History ==
The banking house was founded by Johann Alois Duregger, who applied for commercial banking authorization in 1828. In 1854, Carl Spangler joined the company and one year later married Duregger's daughter. The Spängler family has run the bank for seven generations since 1855.

In 2021, the bank opened its ninth location in Austria.

The bank has one of the country's most important collection of gold coins and medals.

== See also ==
- List of banks in Austria
