= Hypo Noe Landesbank =

Austrian regional bank

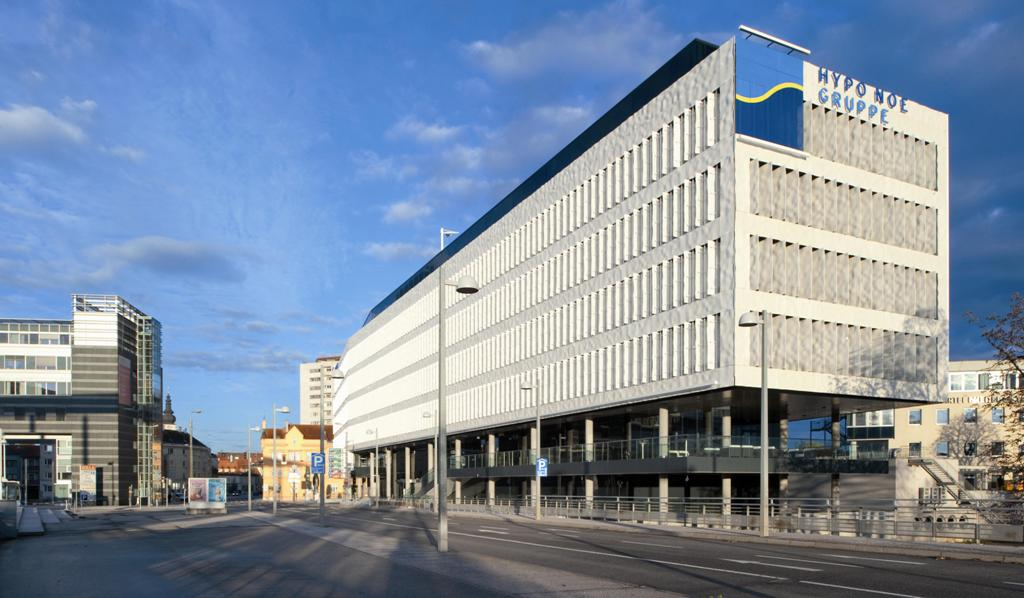
- Corporate headquarters
- Company type: Corporation
- Industry: Mortgage finance
- Founded: 1888; 138 years ago, as Landes- und Hypothekenanstalt für Niederösterreich; 2006, as HYPO NOE Landesbank AG
- Headquarters: Sankt Pölten, Austria
- Net income: €19.5 million (2017)
- Total assets: €16.6 billion (2024)
- Owner: The province of Lower Austria regional government
- Capital ratio: 18.13% according to CRR/CRD IV as at 30 September 2017
- Website: www.hyponoe.at

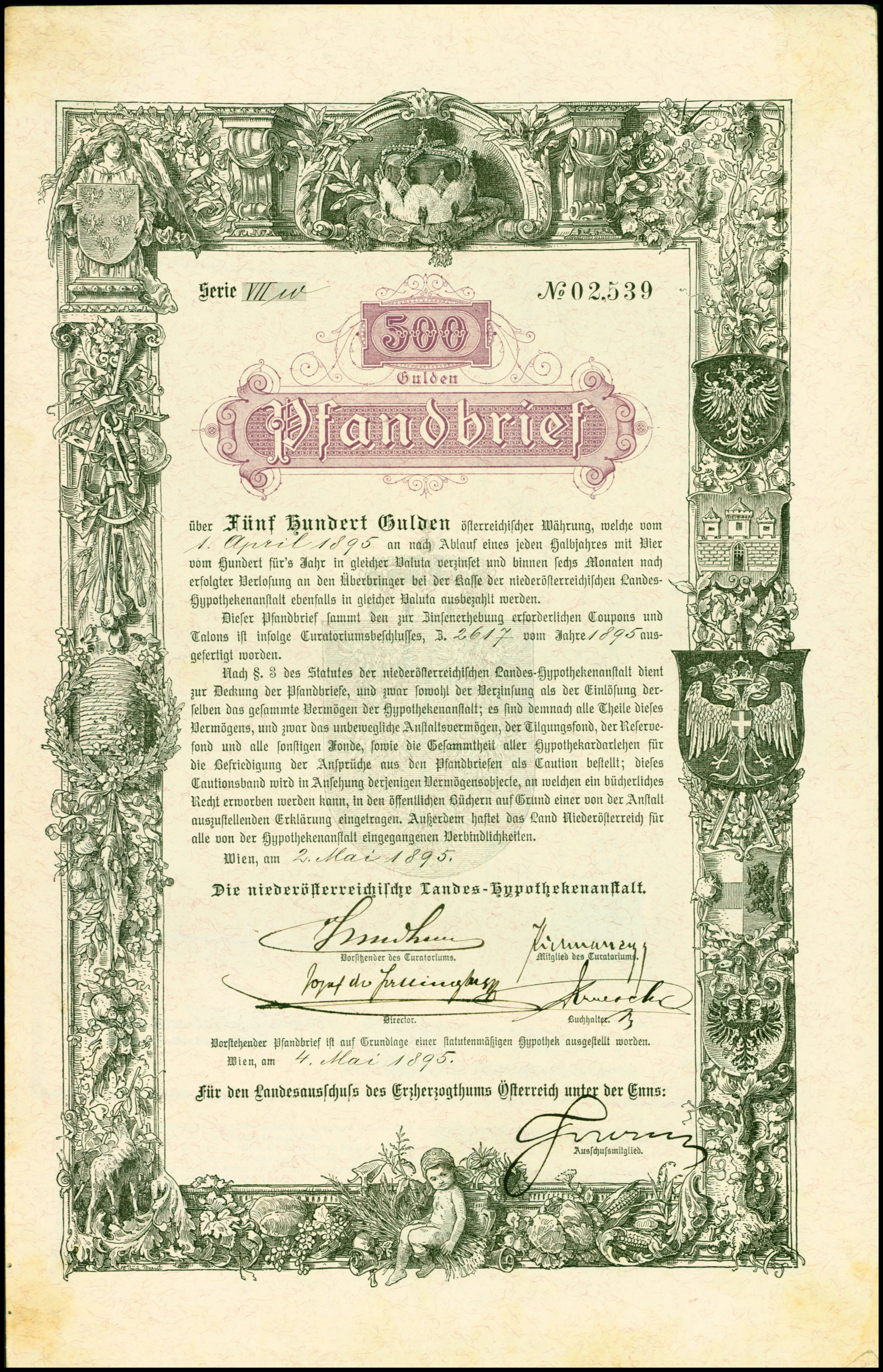
Pfandbrief over 500 guilders of the Niederösterreichische Landes-Hypothekenanstalt of 1895

HYPO NOE Landesbank für Niederösterreich und Wien AG (short: HYPO NOE) is an Austrian regional bank. It is one of the oldest and largest regional banks and was created in 1888.

Within the Group, HYPO NOE is a partner for the public sector, real estate and key accounts as well as private and business customers in the core market of Lower Austria, Vienna and selectively in the Danube region. The Province of Lower Austria is the 100 percent owner of the bank.

== History ==
=== Foundation & first years ===
The oldest part of the Group is the Landesbank, which was founded as the Landes-Hypothekenanstalt für Niederösterreich in 1888. As part of the partial privatization, 26% was sold to Österreichische Volksbanken-Aktiengesellschaft.

=== Restructuring in Hypo Landesbank ===
In 1998 the bank moved its group headquarters to Sankt Pölten. In 1999, ÖVAG's share was increased to 41%. In 2007, the state bought back ÖVAG shares and the bank was divided into HYPO Investmentbank AG and Niederösterreichische Landesbank-Hypothekenbank Aktiengesellschaft (HYPO Landesbank). Since this date, it has again been wholly owned by the Province of Lower Austria.

In September 2017, the banking operations of HYPO NOE Gruppe Bank AG and HYPO NOE Landesbank AG were merged. From 23 September 2017, the merged bank operated under the names HYPO NOE Landesbank für Niederösterreich und Wien AG. By reintegrating the retail and residential construction business into the core bank, efficiency increases could be ensured by reducing the complexity of the organisation and leveraging operational synergy effects.

On 20 July 2017, Investment was dropped from its company name which became Hypo Vorarlberg Bank AG.

=== Current developments ===
In autumn 2012, General Director Peter Harold opened a new corporate headquarters in Sankt Pölten on behalf of the HYPO NOE Group with a net floor area of around 19,000 m^{2}. In addition to these infrastructure measures, the company also intends to continue focusing on sustainable development in its business areas in the federal state of Lower Austria, according to the management board, and has been preparing a sustainability/CSR report on the subject since 2013.

== Group structure ==
The group consists of:

=== 1. HYPO NOE Landesbank für Niederösterreich und Wien AG ===
HYPO NOE Landesbank, the parent company of the HYPO NOE Group, has given itself the goal of being a secure and reliable partner for the public sector, real estate and key accounts as well as private and business customers in the core market of Lower Austria, Vienna and selectively in the Danube region. The product portfolio focuses on financing social and traditional infrastructure, corporate, project and structured finance, as well as real estate finance and treasury solutions.

=== 2. HYPO NOE Leasing GmbH ===
HYPO NOE Leasing GmbH is particularly responsible for leasing businesses with the public sector and with public corporations. Its expertise lies in complex real estate leasing contracts with a project character. In addition, the range of services offered includes the handling of real estate projects as well as the control and management of companies.

=== 3. HYPO NOE Immobilien Beteiligungsholding GmbH ===
The real estate business of the HYPO NOE Group is bundled under the umbrella of HYPO NOE Immobilien Beteiligungsholding GmbH and comprises HYPO NOE Real Consult GmbH and HYPO NOE First Facility GmbH. With the main objective of offering a one-stop service along the entire value chain in real estate management, Holding is responsible for facility and property management, sales/make-up, cross-selling agendas and project development and management.

=== 4. HYPO NOE Valuation & Advisory GmbH ===
HYPO NOE Valuation & Advisory GmbH is a specialist for the valuation and analysis of real estate loan collateral and Group properties in Germany and abroad.

=== 5. HYPO NOE Versicherungsservice GmbH ===
HYPO NOE Versicherungsservice GmbH acts as an independent broker and supports the customers of the HYPO NOE Group in insurance matters.

== Sponsorship ==
Hypo Noe Landesbank acts as a sponsor in the areas of social affairs, art and culture as well as sport. The HYPO NOE Group is one of the largest sports sponsors in Lower Austria. In the field of sports, HYPO NOE Landesbank sponsors, among others:

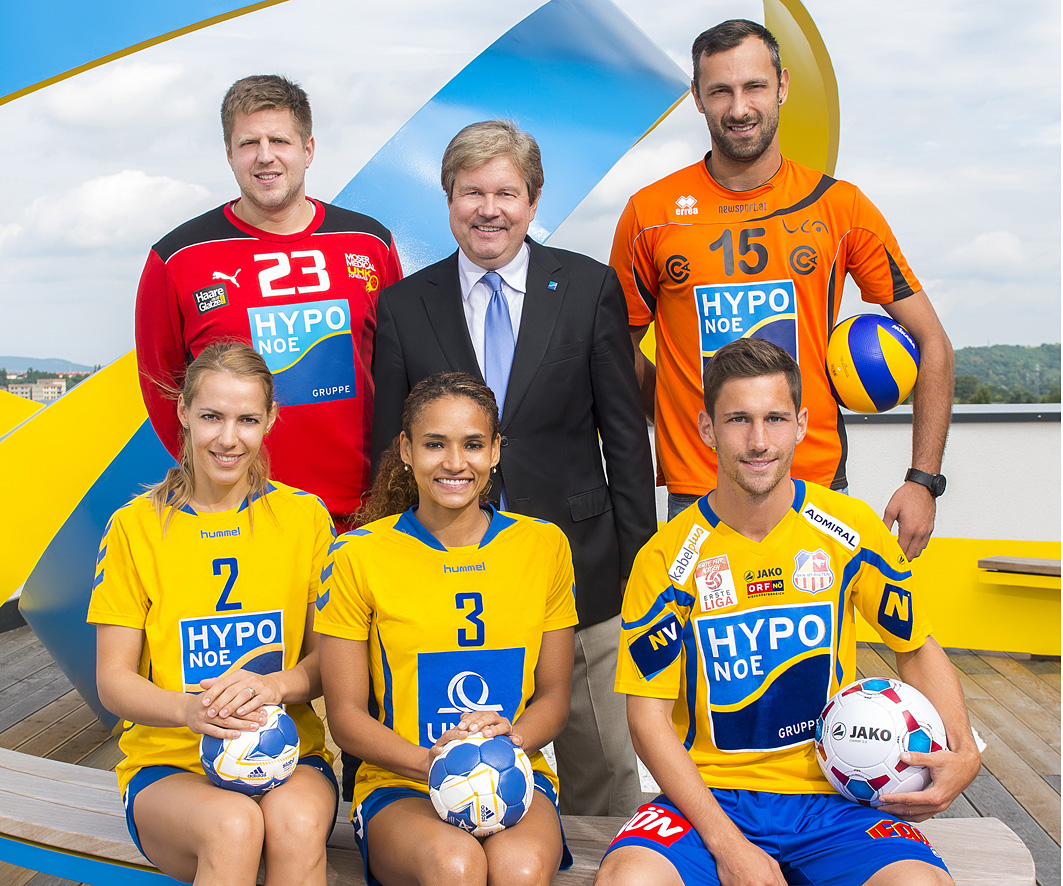
NÖN sports family

Sports:

- the soccer club SKN St. Pölten
- the ladies' handball team Hypo Niederösterreich
- the men's handball team Moser Medical UHK Krems
- the beach volleyball professionals Alexander Horst and Clemens Doppler

Athlete sponsorship:

- Lucas Miedler: young Austrian tennis player
- Pia Zerkhold: Austrian Snowboarder

Culture:

- the Lower Austrian Provincial Exhibition
- the Garden of Tulln
- the culture summer Laxenburg
- Artist Support Program HYPO NOE Art & Culture artconnection

== Controversies ==
In 2007, Hypo Investmentbank acquired a 20% stake in Augustus Funding Ltd. (Dublin) in the amount of approximately €800 million and is said to have speculated on €40 million. According to the Oesterreichische Nationalbank (OeNB) and the Financial Market Authority (FMA), these investments exceeded the large investment limit. The FMA penalty of €58 million was paid in 2011 and taken into account in the annual financial statements. This requirement was challenged by HYPO NOE before the Administrative Court, HYPO NOE was proved right in 2013 and the full amount was remitted to the bank.

The preliminary proceedings initiated by the public prosecutors office years ago in connection with the crash of the securities of the US investment bank Lehman Brothers, were discontinued in 2017 because there were no indications of any misconduct on the part of the executive bodies of HYPO NOE.

== See also ==
- List of banks in the euro area
- List of banks in Austria
