= Walser Privatbank =

Austrian bank

- Company type: Joint-stock company
- Founded: 16 June 1993; 33 years ago
- Headquarters: Hirschegg, Mittelberg (Bregenz District), Vorarlberg, Austria
- Products: Current Accounts; Savings Accounts; Time deposit accounts; Credit Cards; Consumer Loans; Car Loans; Trading Accounts
- Total assets: €451.8 million (2018)
- Number of employees: 139 (2019)
- Parent: Raiffeisen Banking Group (Austria)
- Website: www.walserprivatbank.com

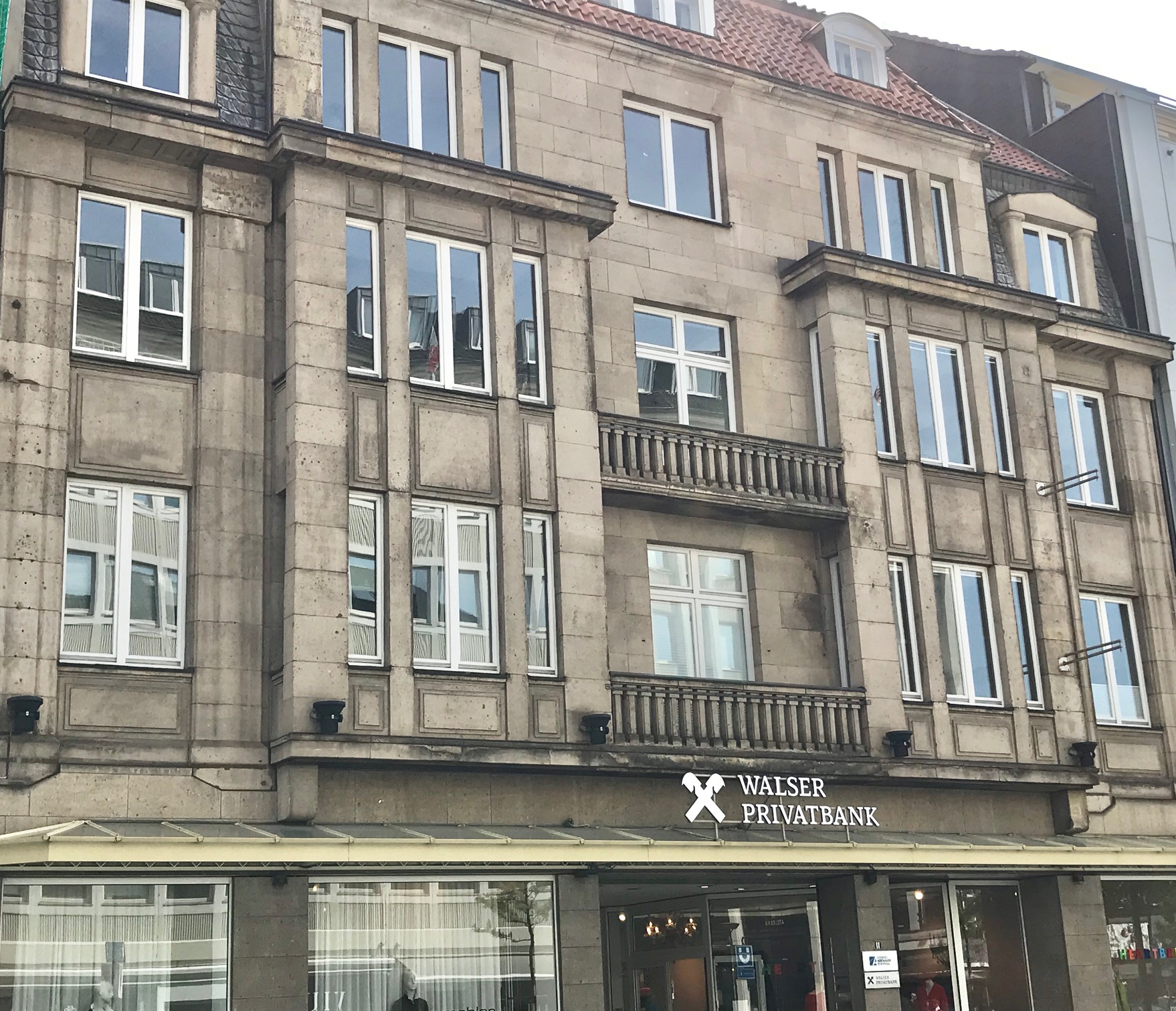
Walser Privatbank - Düsseldorf

Walser Privatbank is an Austrian bank with headquarters in Hirschegg (Mittelberg), Austria. It was originally founded in 1894 as the regional Spar- und Darlehenskassenverein Mittelberg. Its business focus has shifted to private banking, especially for customers with assets of at least 300,000 Euros from Germany.

Due to its location in the Kleinwalsertal customs exclusion area, Walser Privatbank lies in German economic territory, but not under the jurisdiction of German customs. "The Kleinwalsertal benefited from Austrian banking secrecy for many years as a banking location."

The company as a stock corporation specializes in customers with liquid fixed assets of more than 300,000 Euros. As of 2017, the banks assets under management (AUM) were just under 2.9 billion Euros. In addition to its headquarters in Kleinwalsertal (Austria), the bank has branches in Düsseldorf and Stuttgart. It has around 140 employees.

== History ==
The bank was founded in 1894 as Spar- und Darlehenskassenverein Mittelberg in Kleinwalsertal, Austria. It was renamed Raiffeisenbank Kleinwalsertal in 1964 and Walser Privatbank AG in 2010. In 2011 branches were opened in Düsseldorf and Stuttgart.

In 2016, proceedings were brought against bank employees on suspicion of aiding and abetting tax evasion. Walser Privatbank paid a fine of more than 5.4 million Euros.

== See also ==
- List of banks in Austria
