= Private bank =

Bank owned by individuals or partners with unlimited liability

Private banks are banks owned by either the individual or a general partner(s) with limited partner(s). Private banks are not incorporated. In any such case, creditors can look to both the "entirety of the bank's assets" as well as the entirety of the sole-proprietor's/general-partners' assets.

Private banks have a long tradition in Switzerland, dating back to at least the Revocation of the Edict of Nantes (1685). Private banks also have a long tradition in the UK where C. Hoare & Co. has been in business since 1672.

== Notable private banks ==
This list contains two types of banks:

- Unincorporated banks owned by either an individual or a general partner(s) with limited partner(s).
- Incorporated banks specialized in wealth management for high-net-worth individuals.

=== Austria ===
- Bank Gutmann
- Bankhaus Spängler

=== China ===
- Bank of Communications, founded in 1908
- China Merchants Bank

=== France ===
- Compagnie Financière Edmond de Rothschild, Paris, founded in 1953; a member of Edmond de Rothschild Group
- Société Générale

=== Germany ===
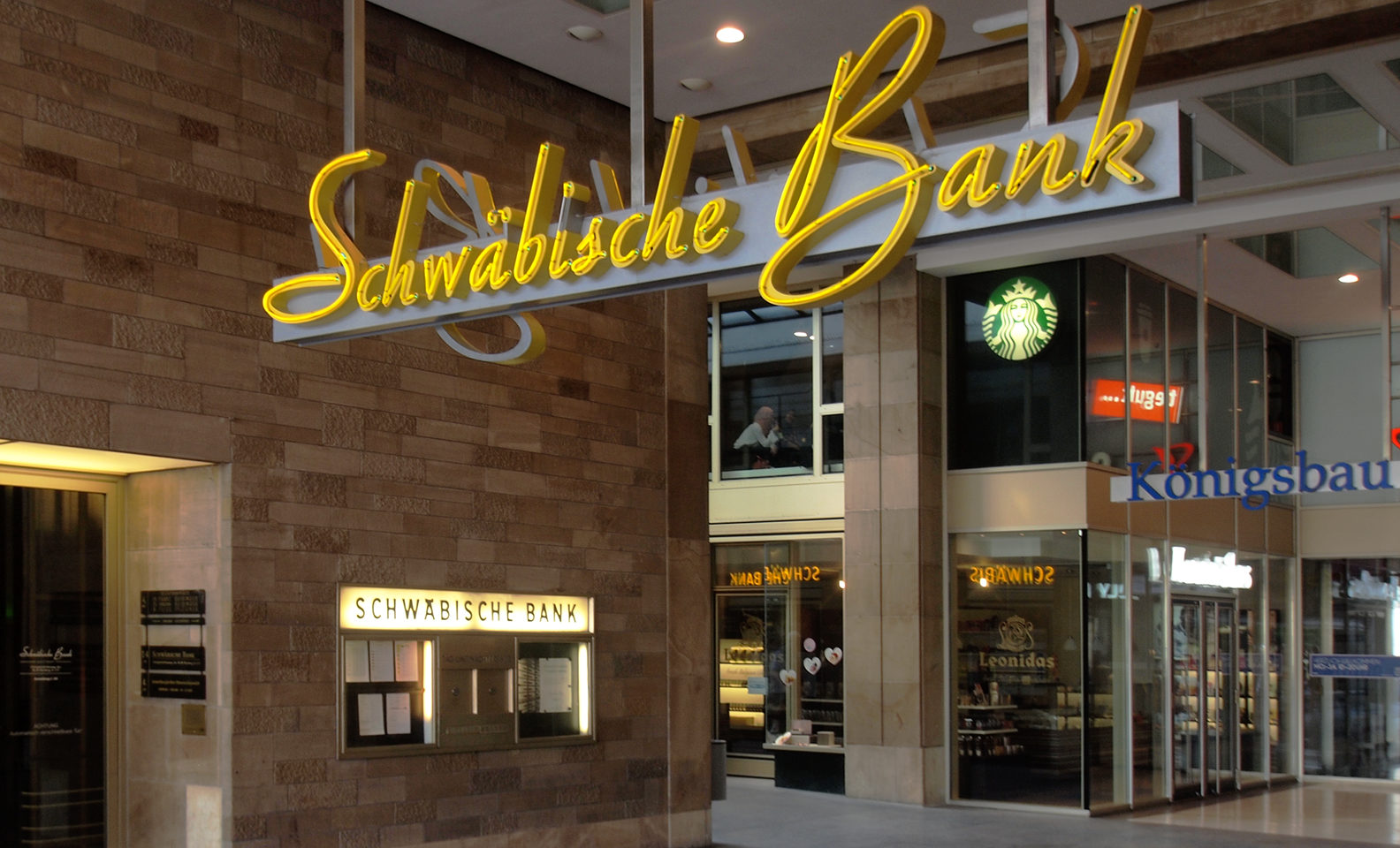
Schwäbische Bank (now part of M.M.Warburg)

- Delbruck Bethmann Maffei, Frankfurt, founded in 1748; a member of ABN AMRO
- M. M. Warburg & Co., Hamburg, founded in 1798
- Sal. Oppenheim, Cologne, founded in 1789; a member of Deutsche Bank

=== India ===
- Federal Bank
- HDFC Bank
- ICICI Bank

=== Italy ===
- Banca Sella Group, founded in 1886.

=== Liechtenstein ===
- LGT Bank, Vaduz, founded in 1920; owned by Princely Family of Liechtenstein

=== Netherlands ===
- Maduro & Curiel's Bank, Willemstad, Curacao founded in 1917
- MeesPierson, Rotterdam, founded in 1720: a member of ABN AMRO
- Van Lanschot Kempen, founded in 1737. It is the oldest independent bank in the Netherlands and the Benelux and one of the oldest independent banks in the world.

=== South Africa ===
- Investec, headquartered in Sandton, and founded in 1974
- RMB, headquartered in Johannesburg, and founded in 1998

=== Switzerland ===
- Banque privée Edmond de Rothschild, Geneva, founded in 1923; a member of Edmond de Rothschild Group
- Baumann & Cie, Banquiers, Basel, founded in 1920
- EFG International, Zurich, founded in 1995; a member of EFG Group, Geneva
- Hyposwiss Private Bank Genève SA, founded in 1889
- Julius Baer, Zurich, founded in 1890
- Landolt & Cie, Lausanne, founded in 1780
- Lombard Odier & Cie, Geneva, founded in 1796
- Pictet & Cie, Geneva, founded in 1805
- Union Bancaire Privée, Geneva, founded in 1969
- MBaer Merchant Bank AG, Zurich, founded in 2018

=== United Kingdom ===
- Arbuthnot Latham & Co., London, founded in 1833
- Brown Shipley, London, founded in 1810; a member of KBL epb Group
- Cater Allen, London, founded in 1816: a member of Santander
- Child & Co., London, founded in 1664; a member of NatWest Group
- C. Hoare & Co., London, founded in 1672
- Coutts & Co., London, founded in 1692; a member of NatWest Group
- Hampden & Co., Edinburgh, founded in 2015
- Weatherbys, Established in 1770 as a bank to the horse racing industry, now based in Northamptonshire

=== United States ===
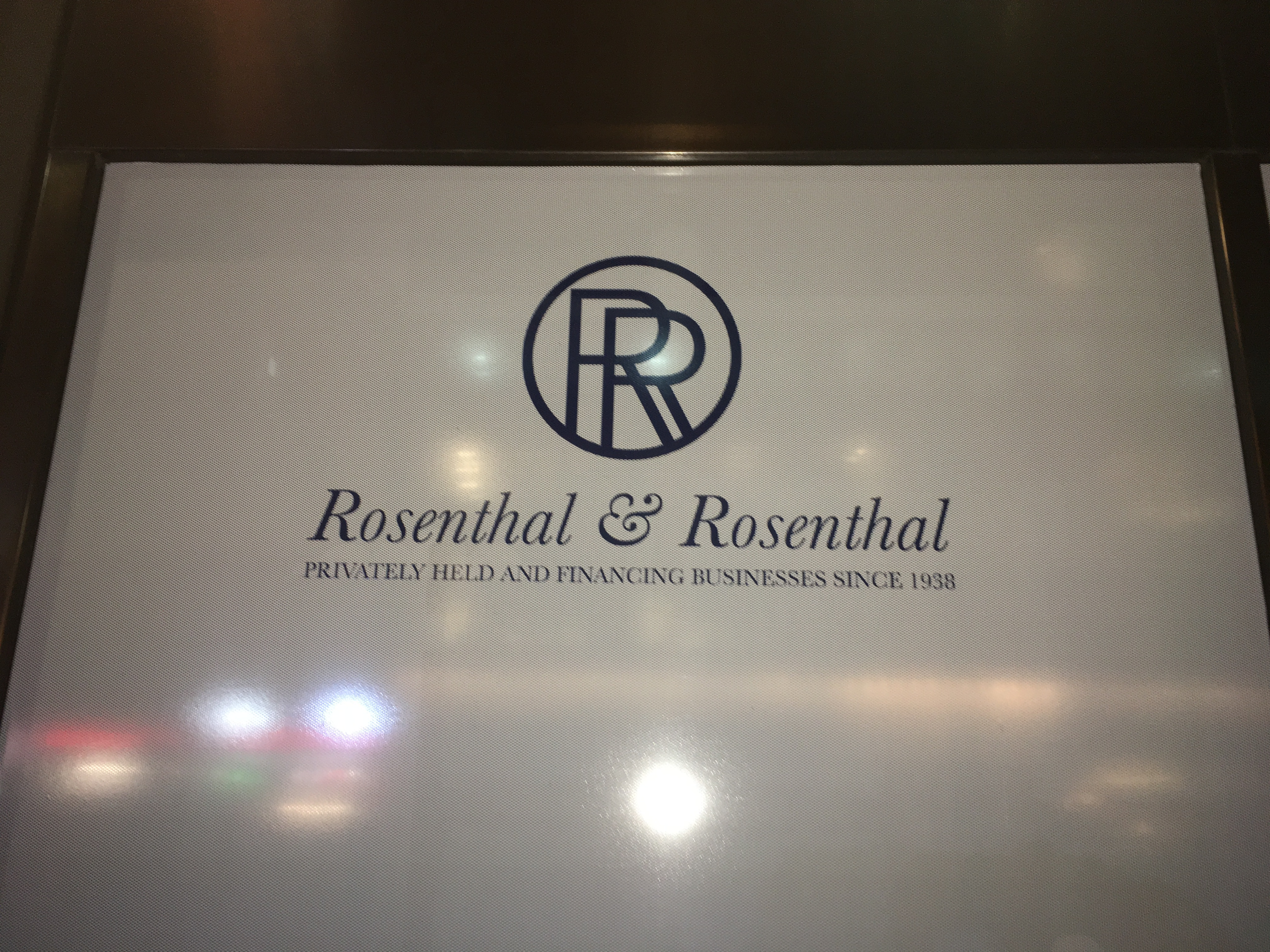
Rosenthal and Rosenthal private bank

- Brown Brothers Harriman & Co., New York City, founded in 1818

== See also ==
- Bank secrecy
- Family office
- Offshore bank
- Private banks
- Public bank
- Swiss bank
