= Allgemeine Bodencreditanstalt =

Former bank in Austria

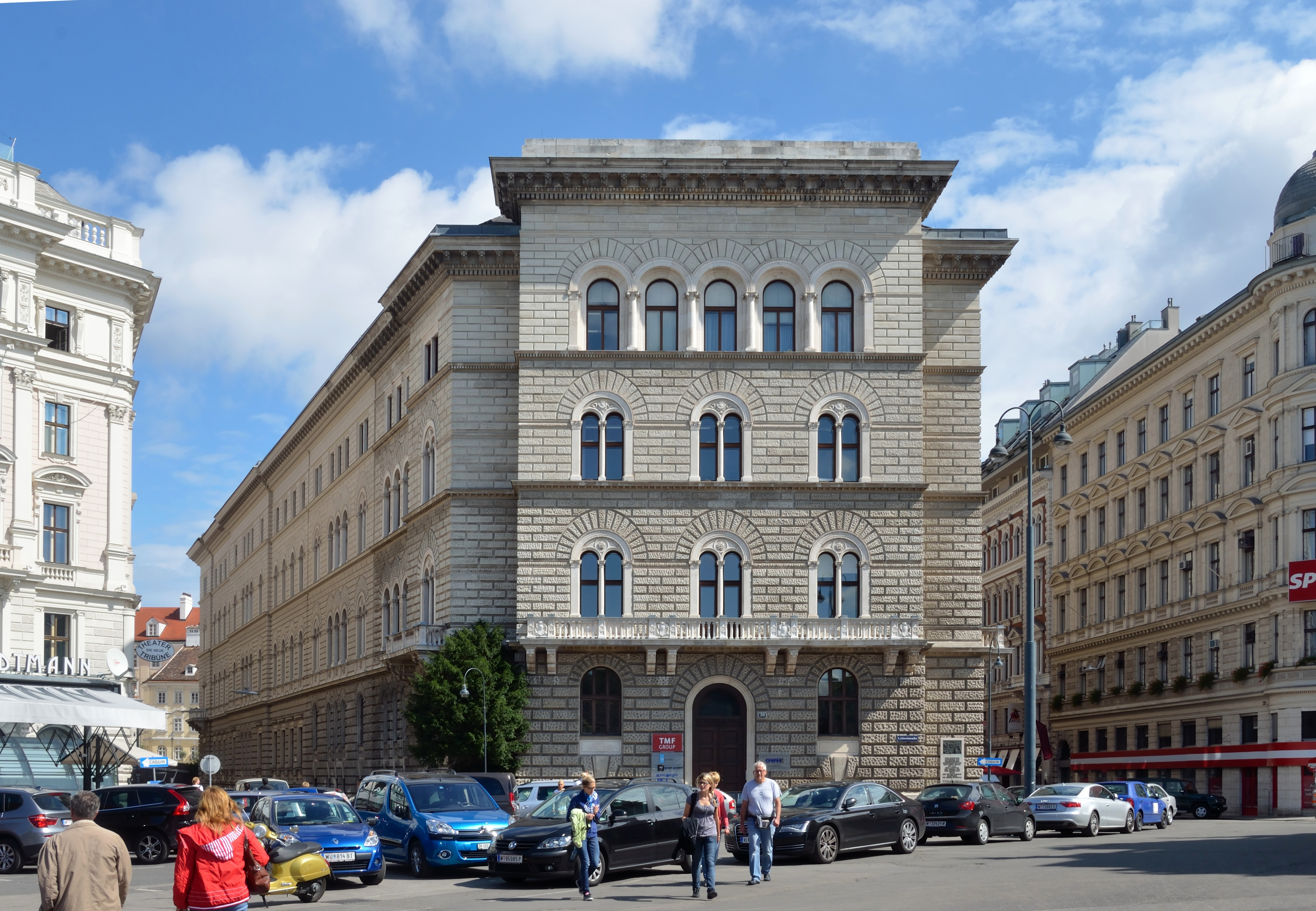
Former head office of Bodencreditanstalt at Teinfaltstrasse 8 and Löwelstrasse 20, Vienna; erected 1884–1887 on a design by architect Emil von Förster

The Allgemeine Bodencreditanstalt or Boden-Credit-Anstalt (lit. 'General Land Credit Institution', French: Crédit foncier autrichien, also known as Bodencredit or simply "Boden") was an Austrian bank based in Vienna, created in 1863 and absorbed in 1929 by its main competitor the Creditanstalt following its 1927 acquisition of two smaller troubled banks, Verkehrsbank and Unionbank.

== Bodencreditanstalt ==
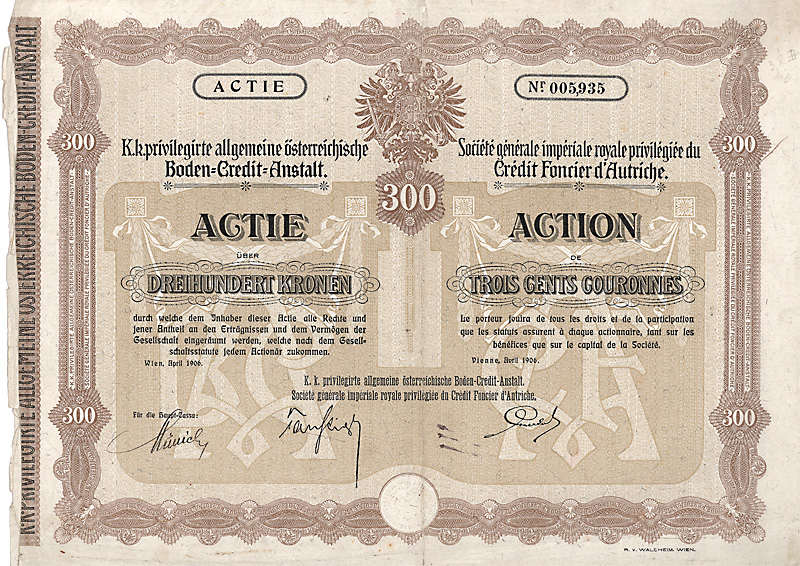
Share certificate of the Bodencreditanstalt, April 1906

The bank was established in 1863 as k.k. privilegierte Allgemeine Österreichische Boden-Credit-Anstalt, by a group of financiers including Simon Sinas. It had strong aristocratic connections, and also managed money for the Habsburg family. It was initially involved in mortgage credit, for which it became a dominant provider, and lending to industry and infrastructure projects such as railway construction. Following the Austrian financial crisis of 1873, it had to be rescued by emergency financial assistance from the Imperial government, which it reimbursed in 1875.

From 1899 on, it also developed a significant portfolio of equity stakes in manufacturing businesses, including the textile industry. Unlike other Austrian universal banks, however, it did not develop a branch network. Rudolf Sieghart, appointed the Bodencreditanstalt's Governor in 1910, adopted an aggressive stance of rapid expansion and head-on competition with the Rothschild-led Creditanstalt, particularly after the end of World War I. By then, the Bodencreditanstalt had become Austria's second-largest bank after Creditanstalt. J.P. Morgan & Co. acquired a stake in the Bodencreditanstalt in the early 1920s, but withdrew in 1923 following a difference of views with Sieghart. The Bodencreditanstalt subsequently attempted to expand in Central Europe, but soon suffered from difficulties with some of its industrial borrowers, particularly Steyr-Werke. in October 1929, it became clear that the bank was no longer viable. Austrian Chancellor Johannes Schober intervened forcefully and persuaded Louis Nathaniel de Rothschild that Creditanstalt should purchase its troubled competitor, albeit at a heavily discounted stock price.

== Verkehrsbank ==
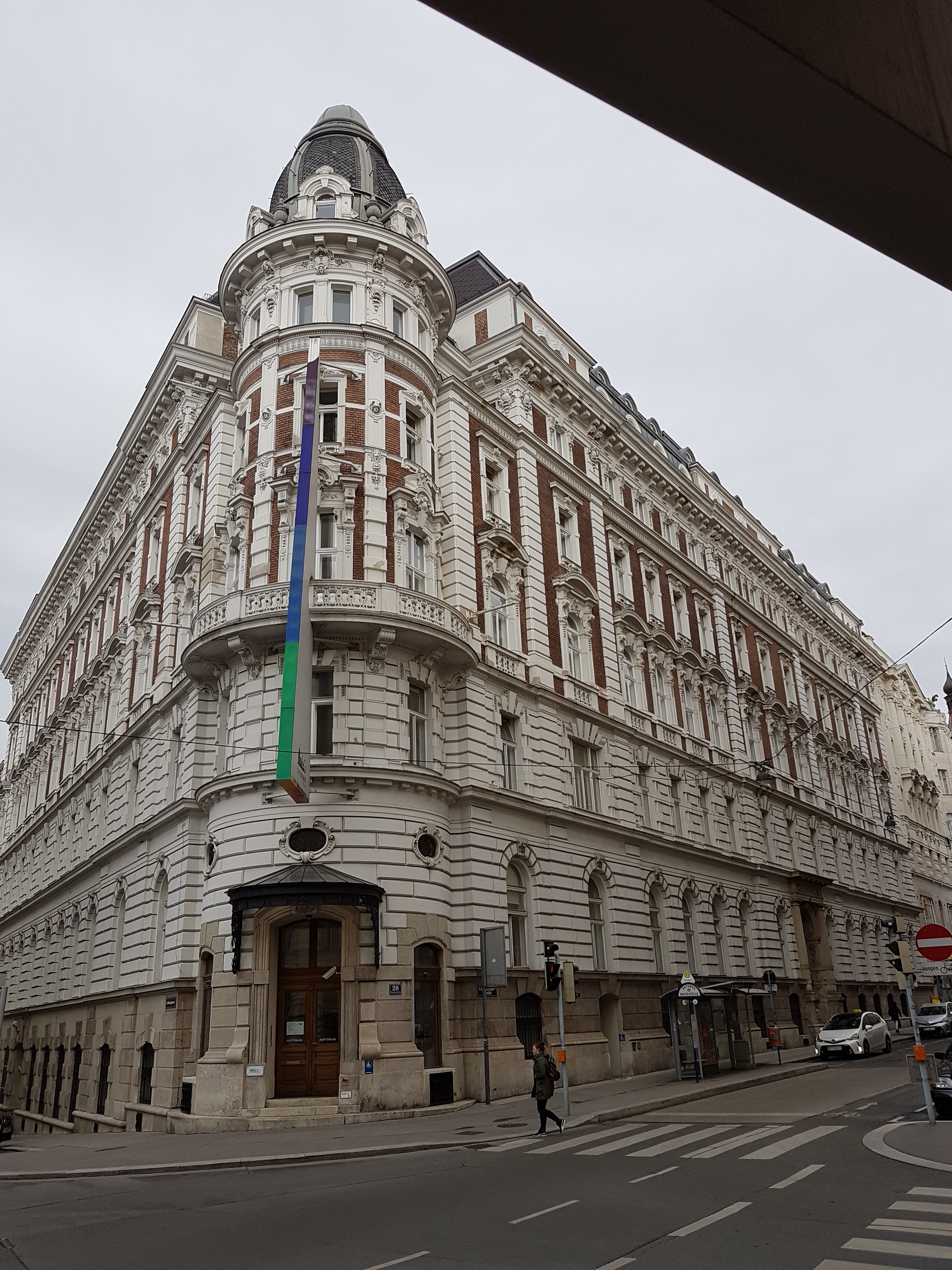
Building at Wipplingerstrasse 28 in Vienna, Verkehrsbank head office 1883-1927

The Allgemeine Verkehrsbank was established in 1864, initially as a discount bank. It soon developed as a universal bank, with investments in heavy engineering and machinery, paper, sugar, hospitality, and other industries. It was located from inception at Wipplingerstrasse 28 in Vienna, which it had rebuilt in 1880–1883 on a design by architect Friedrich Schachner. It was acquired by the Bodencreditanstalt in 1927, possibly as an intended offset to the acquisition of the much more troubled Unionbank at the same time.

== Unionbank ==
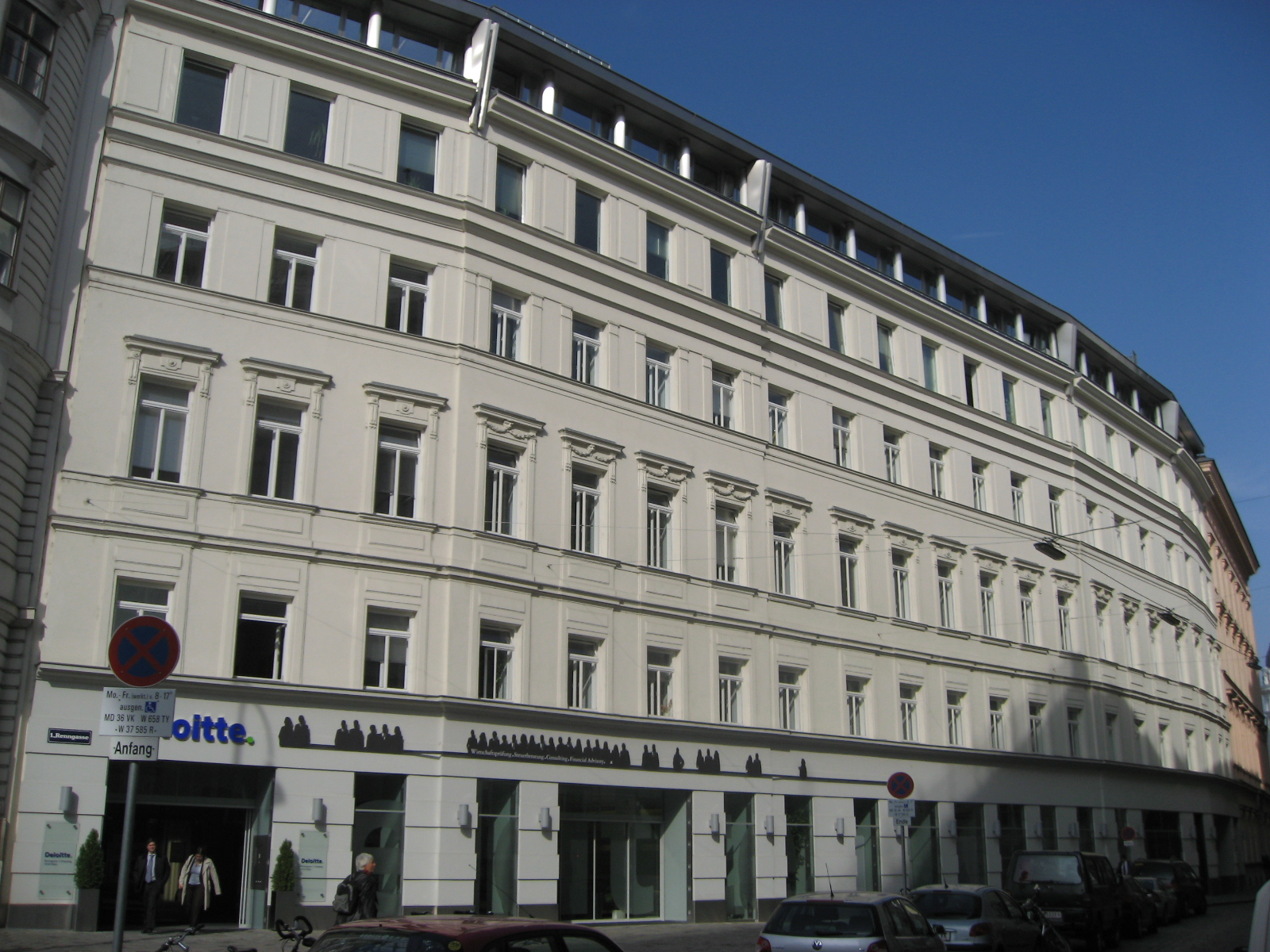
Building at Renngasse 1 in Vienna, Unionbank head office 1887-1926

Unionbank was created in 1870 through the merger of Allgemeine Agrarbank, Österreichische Diskontobank, Österreichisch-Niederländische Bank, and Wiener Bank. In 1872 its branch in Prague became an autonomous institution, the Böhmische Union Bank. From 1887, Unionbank had its head office on Renngasse 1, a former home of the Rothschild family and Creditanstalt. In 1922, it was purchased by financier Siegmund Bosel. It quickly ran into distress, was purchased by Österreichische Postsparkasse in 1926, and on by the Bodencreditanstalt in 1927 simultaneously as the Verkehrsbank.

== Mergers and aftermath ==
The acquisition of Verkehrsbank and Unionbank soon put the Bodencreditanstalt in jeopardy, mostly because of the burden associated with Unionbank. It delayed writing off the bad loans inherited from the two banks it had acquired, but that lack of transparency only compounded the loss of confidence. In October 1929, the Austrian government leaned on Creditanstalt to acquire the ailing Bodencreditanstalt, which in turn was at the root of Creditanstalt's collapse less than two years later, a major development of the European banking crisis of 1931.

== Bodencreditanstalt leadership ==
- Móric Almásy, Governor 1863-1873
- Franz von Hopfen, General Director 1864-1880
- Alois Moser, Governor 1873-1878
- Joseph von Bezecny, Governor 1878-1904
- Theodor von Taussig, member of management 1874–1908, Governor 1908-1909
- Alexander Spitzmüller, General Director 1909-1910
- Rudolf Sieghart, Governor 1910-1917
- Karl von Leth, Governor 1917-1919
- Rudolf Sieghart, Governor 1919-1929

== See also ==
- Anglo-Austrian Bank
- Wiener Bankverein
- List of banks in Austria
