= Wüstenrot-Gruppe =

- Industry: financial service activities, except insurance and pension funding
- Headquarters: Austria
- Parent: Wüstenrot Bausparkasse
- Subsidiaries: Wüstenrot building society; Wüstenrot insurance company
- Website: wuestenrot.at

Wüstenrot-Gruppe (the Wüstenrot Group) is an Austrian company for financial services and real-estate. Its main two subsidiaries are the Wüstenrot building society and the Wüstenrot insurance company.

Since 1993, they have made a major expansion into the markets of Central and Eastern Europe. Wüstenrot has subsidiaries in the Czech Republic, Slovakia, Hungary, Slovenia, Croatia.

They are known for their banner ads for time deposits ("Top Termingeld Flex") featuring a picture of a man holding a cocktail shaker.

Today, the Wüstenrot building society and its former subsidiary operate under the umbrella of Wüstenrot Verwaltungs- und dienstleistungen GmbH. In Austria, Wüstenrot Bausparkasse and Wüstenrot Versicherungs-AG have more than 150 branches, most of which are used jointly. Beyond the Austrian borders, both companies are represented in Hungary, Croatia and Slovakia. The offices in the Czech Republic were taken over by the German Wüstenrot Group in 2015 in return for the Slovak offices.

== See also ==
- List of banks in the euro area
- List of banks in Austria
