= Austrian Raiffeisen Banking Group =

Cooperative banking group in Austria

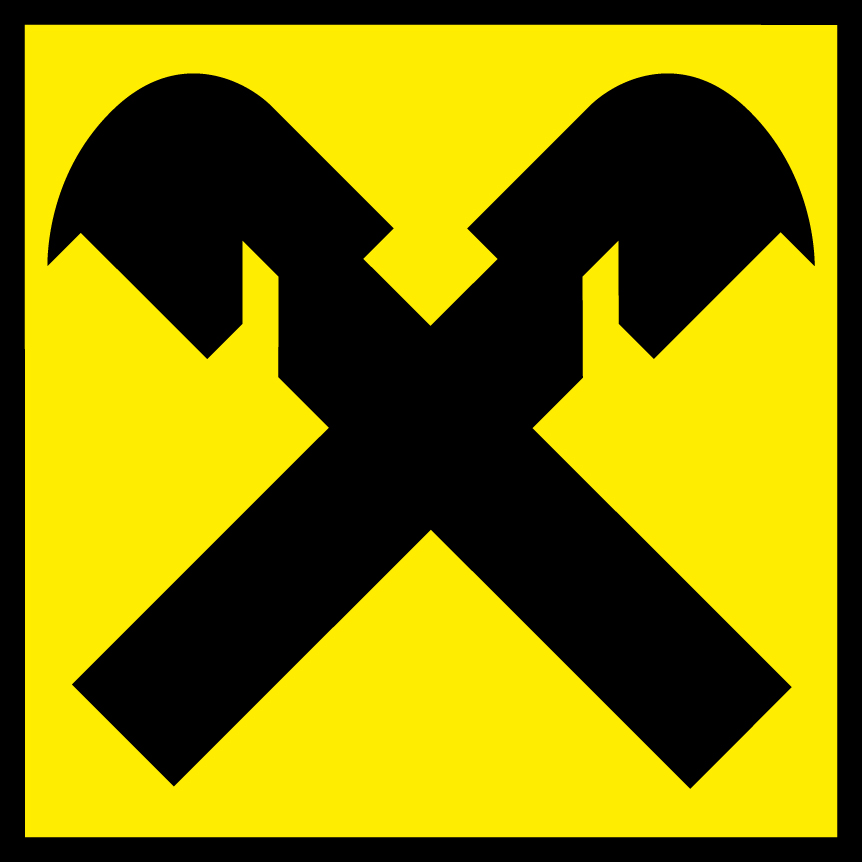
The "gable cross" (German: Giebelkreuz), logo of the Raiffeisen banks in Austria, refers to the traditional Pferdeköpfe house ornament

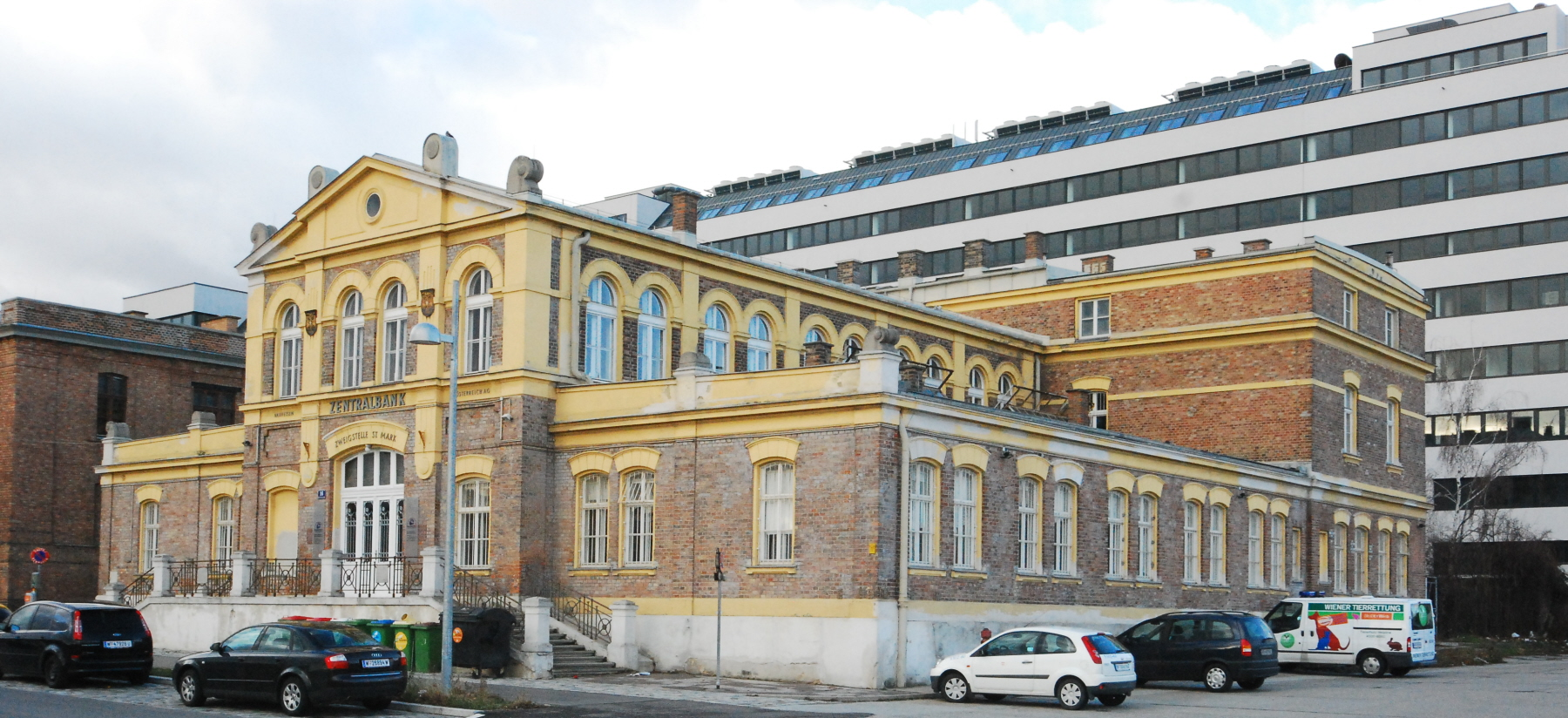
Former livestock market branch, Karl-Farkas-Gasse 16 in Vienna

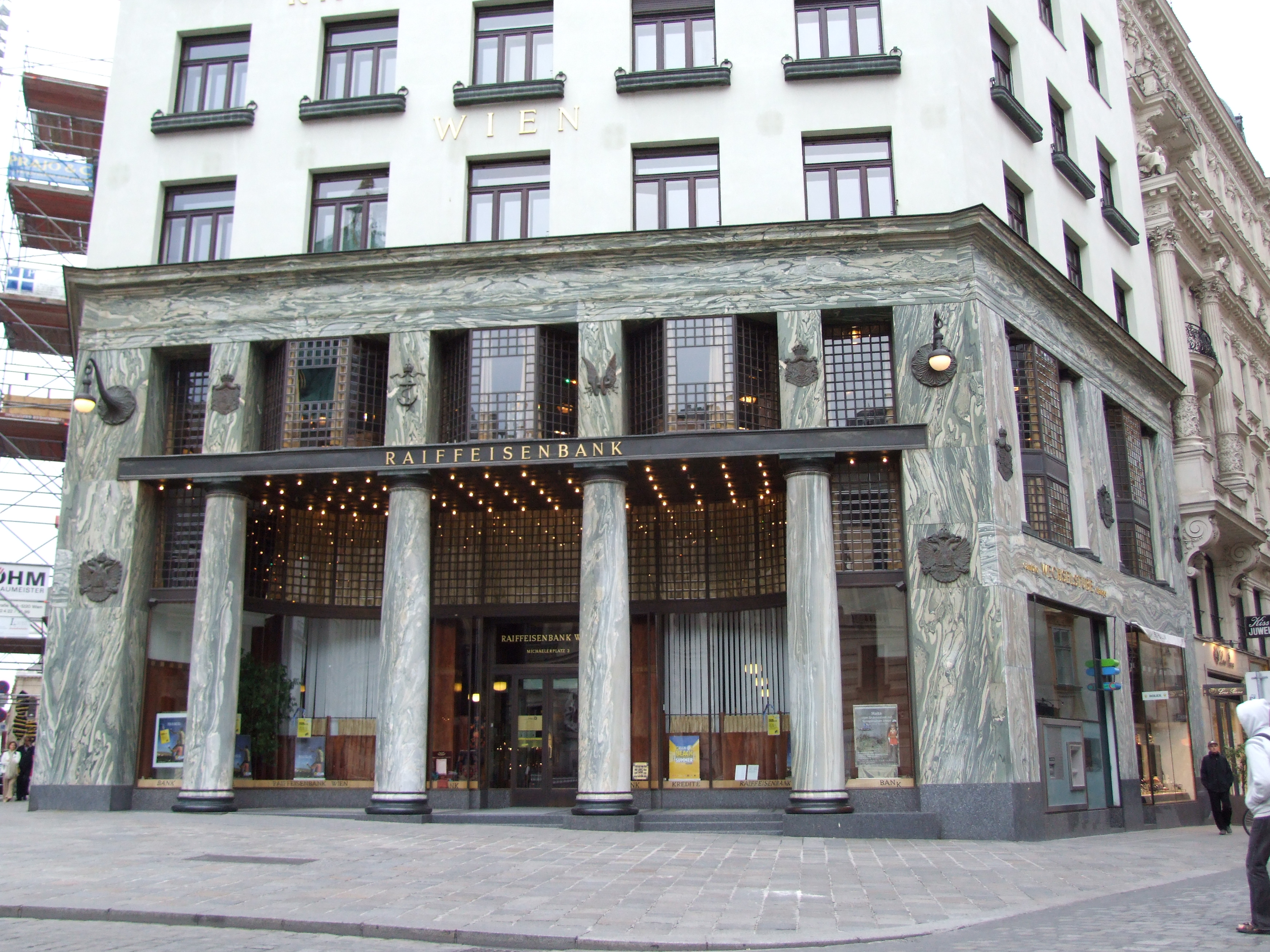
Flagship Vienna branch in Looshaus building, purchased by Raiffeisen Bank in 1987

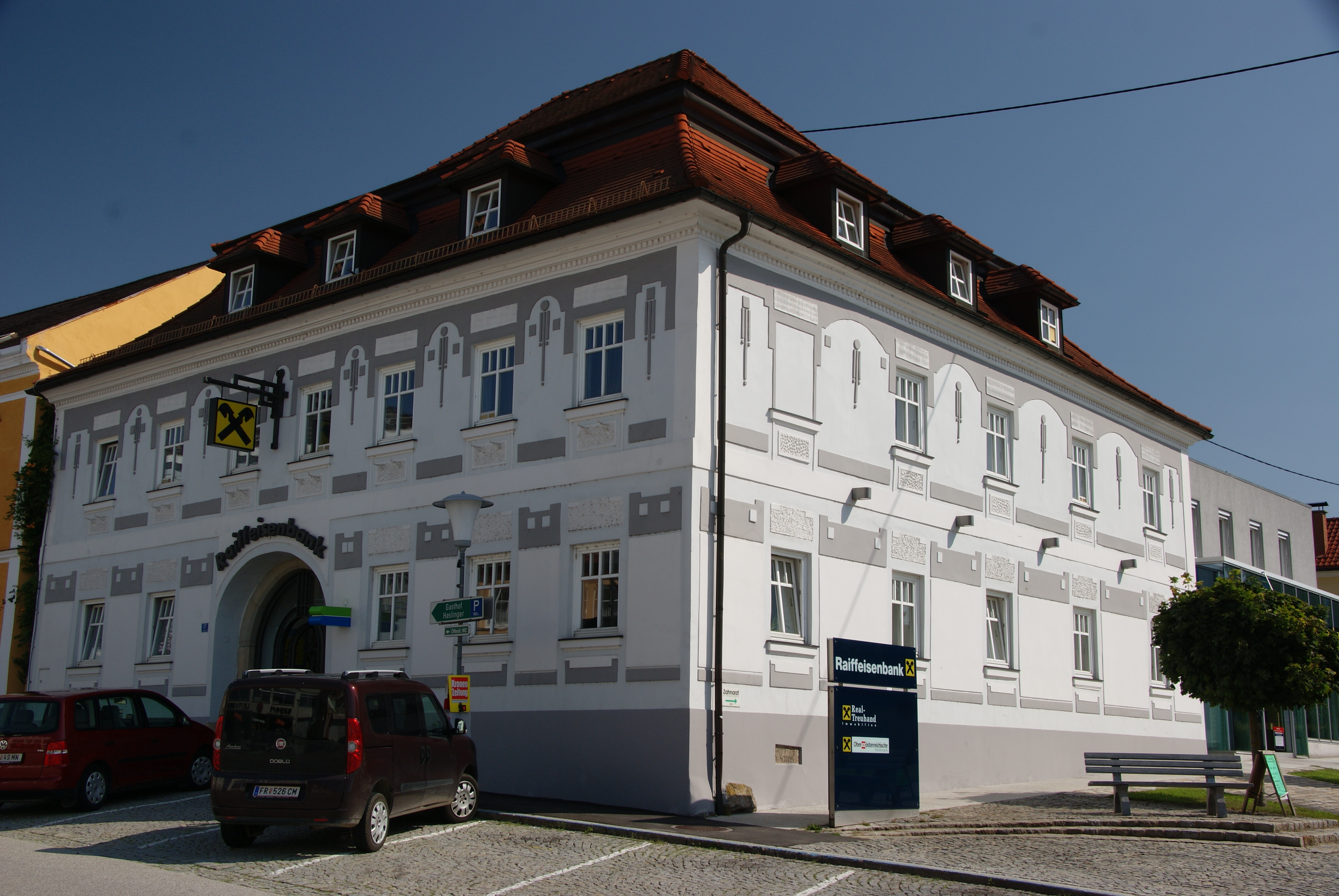
Raiffeisenbank in Pregarten, Upper Austria

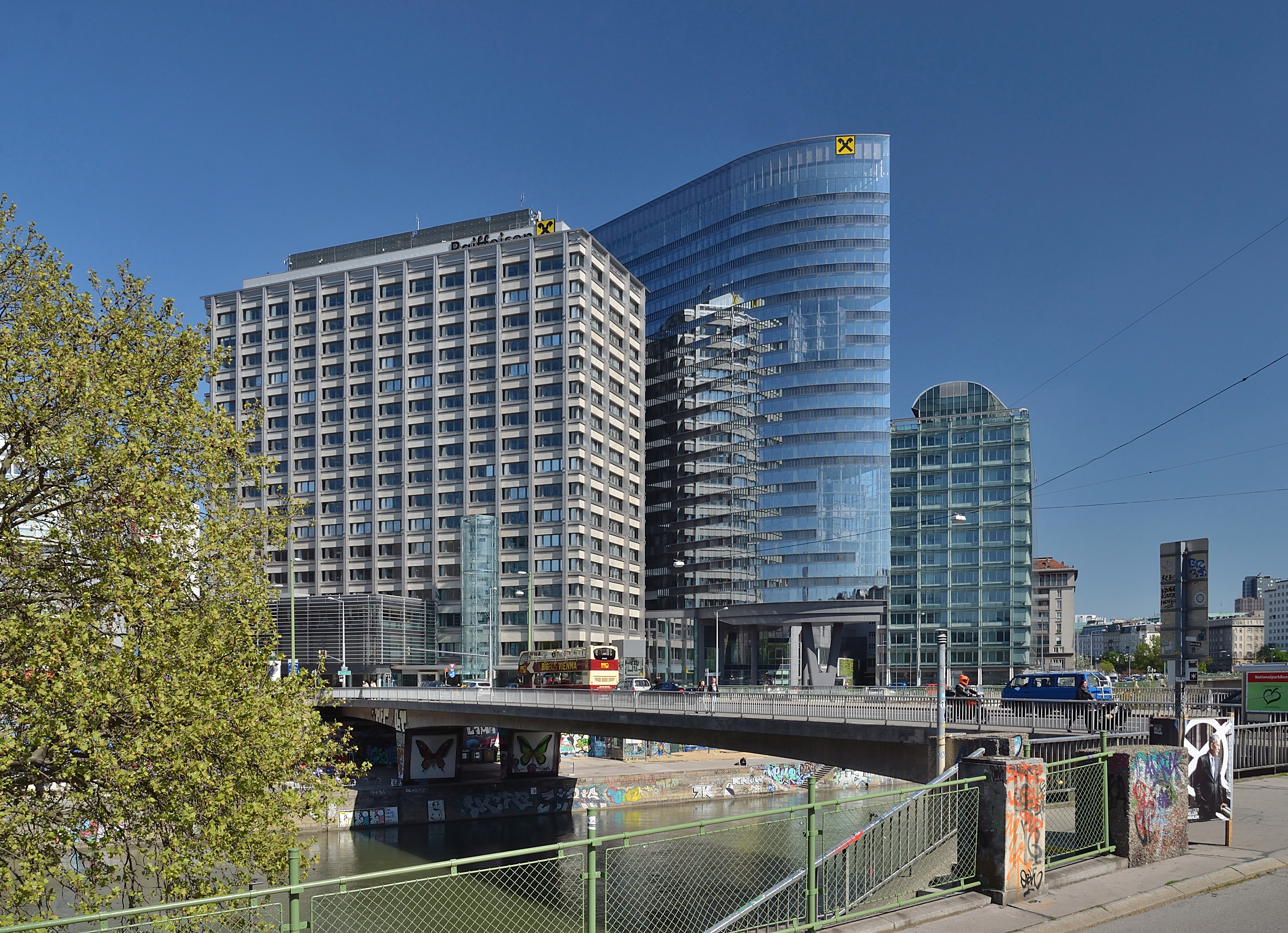
Head office of Raiffeisenlandesbank Niederösterreich-Wien in Vienna

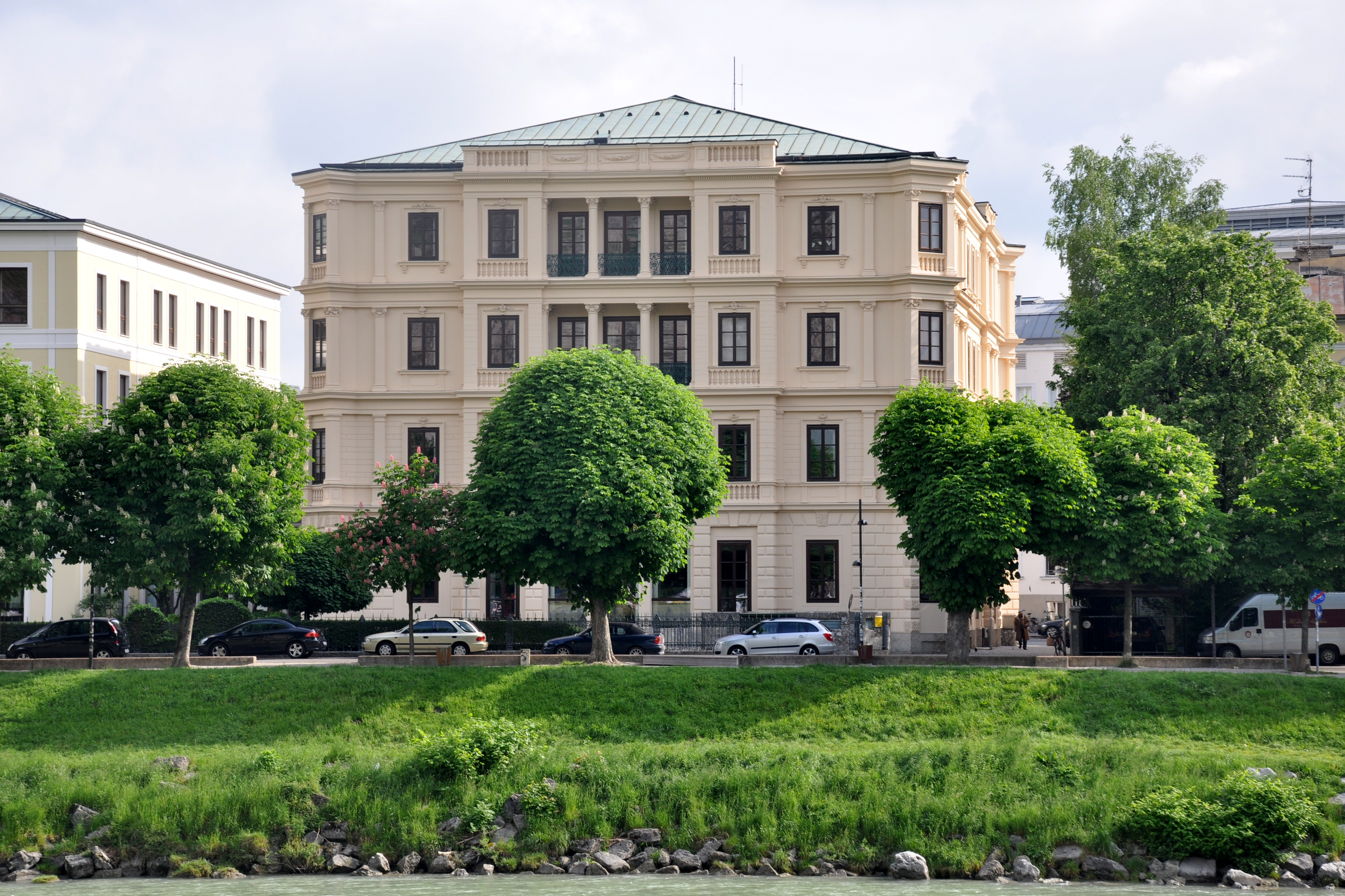
Raiffeisenverband building, Schwarzstrasse 13 in Salzburg

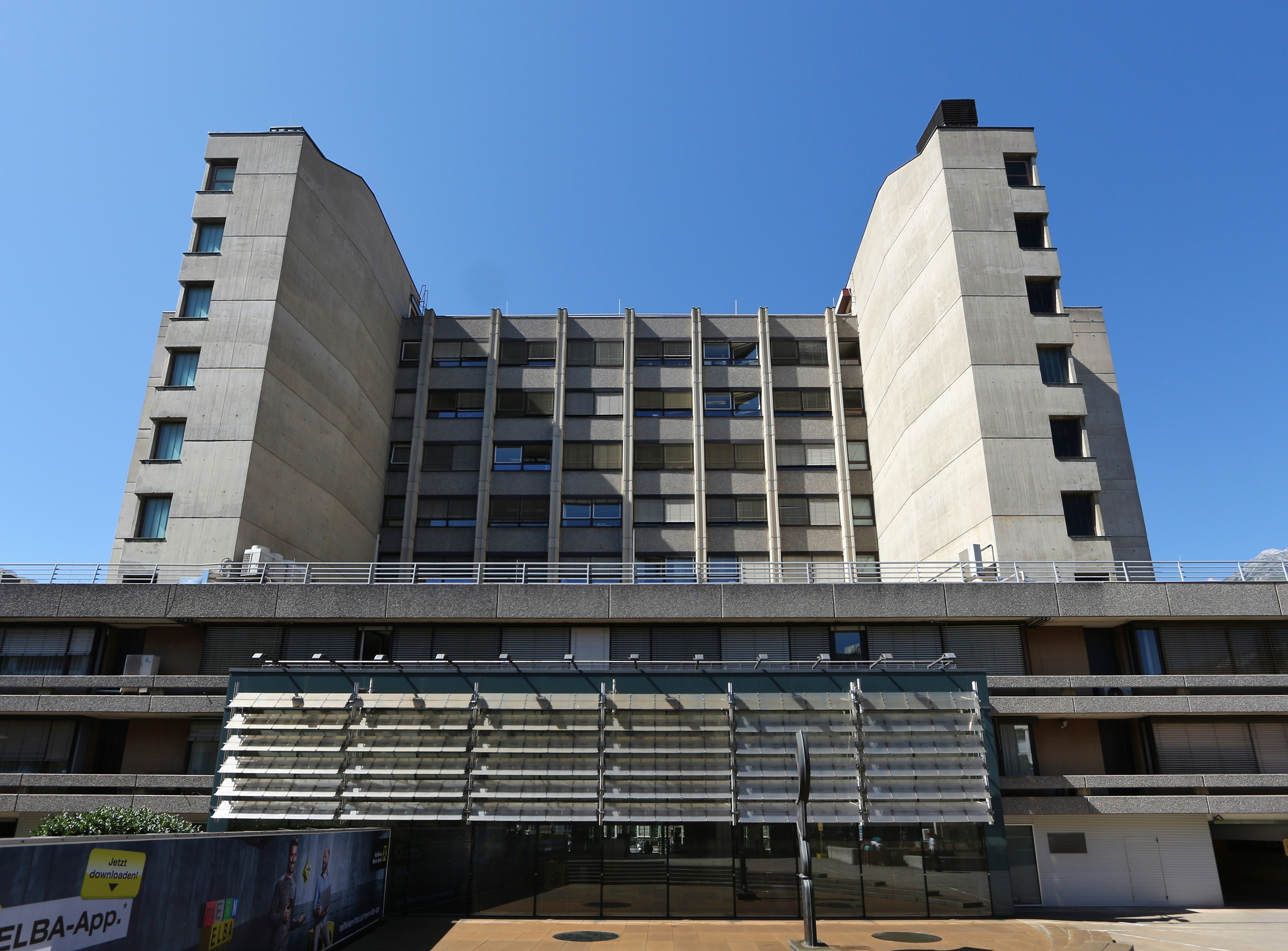
Raiffeisen-Landesbank Tirol head office, Adamgasse 5 in Innsbruck

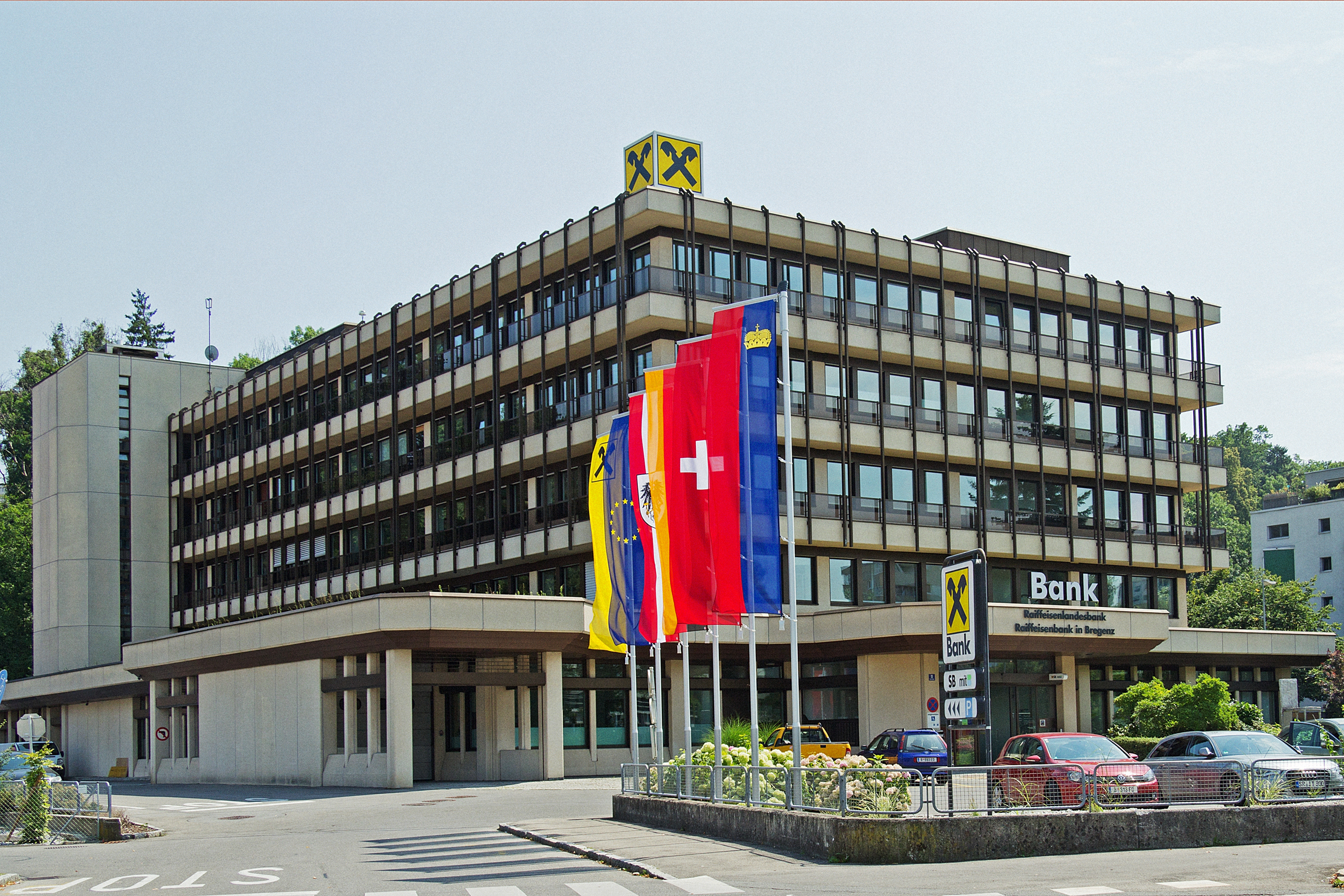
Raiffeisenlandesbank Vorarlberg head office, Rheinstrasse 11 in Bregenz

The Raiffeisen Banking Group (German: Raiffeisen Bankengruppe Österreich, RBG) is a group of cooperative banks in Austria. The Austrian Raiffeisen banks are not consolidated under a single parent entity but are financially linked through a common institutional protection scheme (IPS) and deposit guarantee scheme. The group's international operations, by contrast, are consolidated under Raiffeisen Bank International (RBI).

As of end-2024, the Raiffeisen Group IPS reported aggregate assets of €404.5 billion, while RBI reported consolidated assets of €200 billion.

== History ==
The movement to create rural cooperative banks initiated in Germany by Friedrich Wilhelm Raiffeisen spread to the Habsburg Monarchy in 1886, two years before Raiffeisen's death, with the establishment of the country's first Raiffeisenkasse at Mühldorf near Spitz in Lower Austria. The movement first national representative body was founded in 1898 under the name Allgemeiner Verband landwirtschaftlicher Genossenschaften in Österreich (lit. 'General association of agricultural cooperatives in Austria'). As Austria became a separate republic in 1918, more than 2000 local Raiffeisen banks were present on the new country's territory. In 1927, a central financial institution was created the Genossenschaftliche Zentralbank, later renamed Raiffeisen Zentralbank Österreich. In the following decade, the group built up its network of regional banks. Following the Anschluss in 1938, the Austrian Raiffeisen banks were subsumed into the German cooperative financial group. The separate Austrian group was recreated in the postwar era, with the Allgemeiner Verband re-established in 1946 and renamed in 1960 as Österreichischer Raiffeisenverband.

The group's international expansion started in 1986 with the creation of a first banking subsidiary in Hungary. In 1989, the Genossenschaftliche Zentralbank was renamed Raiffeisen Zentralbank (RZB). By 2003, the group had expanded to 15 central and eastern European countries. The international activities were brought together into Raiffeisen International Bank-Holding AG, which went public in 2005 and was merged into the new RBI entity in 2010. In 2017, RBI in turn absorbed its parent company RZB, thus resulting in a more streamlined group structure.

== Members ==
As of end-2021, the group included 342 local cooperative banks (Raiffeisenbank), 8 regional wholesale banks (Raiffeisenlandesbank), and the central entity Raiffeisen Bank International. All Raiffeisenlandesbanken are owned by their respective member banks; their legal form is a cooperative (German: eingetragene Genossenschaft, eGen), limited-liability cooperative (German: registrierte Genossenschaft mit beschränkter Haftung, regGenmbH), or joint-stock-company (German: Aktiengesellschaft, AG). The Raiffeisenlandesbanken in turn own RBI under a shareholders' agreement. The eight Raiffeisen-Landesbanken as of early 2024 were:

- Raiffeisenlandesbank Niederösterreich-Wien AG
- Raiffeisenlandesbank Oberösterreich AG
- Raiffeisenlandesbank Burgenland und Revisionsverband eGen
- Raiffeisen-Landesbank Steiermark AG
- Raiffeisenlandesbank Kärnten - Rechenzentrum und Revisionsverband regGenmbH
- Raiffeisen-Landesbank Tirol AG
- Raiffeisenlandesbank Vorarlberg Waren- und Revisionsverband regGenmbH
- Raiffeisenverband Salzburg eGen

== Group-level arrangements and deposit insurance ==
Until 2021, the Raiffeisen Banking Group's institutional protection scheme included seven regional funds (one for each of the federal states of Austria except Carinthia and Salzburg) complemented by a national fund. A mutual support scheme established in 1999, the Raiffeisen Customer Guarantee Scheme Austria (German: Raiffeisen-Kundengarantiegemeinschaft Österreich, RKÖ) was phased out in 2019.

Until end-2018, the Raiffeisen Banking Group relied on an in-house deposit insurance system, the Österreichische Raiffeisen-Einlagensicherung eGen (ÖRE). As a belated consequence of the EU Deposit Guarantee Scheme Directive of 2014, the Raiffeisen Banking Group decided to join the Austrian national deposit guarantee scheme (German: Einlagesicherung Austria or ESA, also known in Austria as the uniform scheme), starting on 1 January 2019. In 2020, however, the Raiffeisen banks had to contribute to the replenishment of the uniform deposit fund following the near-simultaneous failures of Anglo Austrian AAB Bank and Commerzialbank Mattersburg. A perception that risk-sharing within the uniform scheme was detrimental to the Raiffeisen participants led to the decision in 2021 to form a separate deposit guarantee scheme as allowed by Austrian law, Österreichische Raiffeisen-Sicherungseinrichtung eGen (ÖRS), which became operational in November 2021. At that occasion and as part of an agreement with the Austrian Financial Market Authority and European Banking Supervision, the Raiffeisen Banking Group simultaneously streamlined its institutional protection scheme structure into a single nationwide fund. ÖRS also manages liquid assets for the institutional protection scheme. The previous sub-national funds were accordingly dissolved in June 2021.

Under Austrian law, the Raiffeisen deposit guarantee scheme may be called to intervene if the other two schemes, the uniform ESA and that of the Sparkassengruppe Österreich, are depleted; conversely, the two other scheme may protect Raiffeisen depositors if the Raiffeisen scheme gets depleted. The Austrian state may intervene if all three schemes are depleted.

== Russian operations of Raiffeisen Bank International ==
The bank is still operating in Russia despite the sanctions imposed by the European Union on the Russian Federation after the Russian attack on Ukraine. In May 2024, the United States Treasury Department warned that Raiffeisen is at risk of having its access to the US financial system curtailed because of its operations in Russia. Raiffeisen subsequently announced that it would suspend all outgoing payments in US dollars from Russia by June 10 that year.

== See also ==
- Alpen Privatbank
- HYPO Steiermark
- Banking in Austria
- List of banks in Austria
- List of banks in the euro area
- List of European cooperative banks
