= Magnus Brunner =

Austrian politician (born 1972)

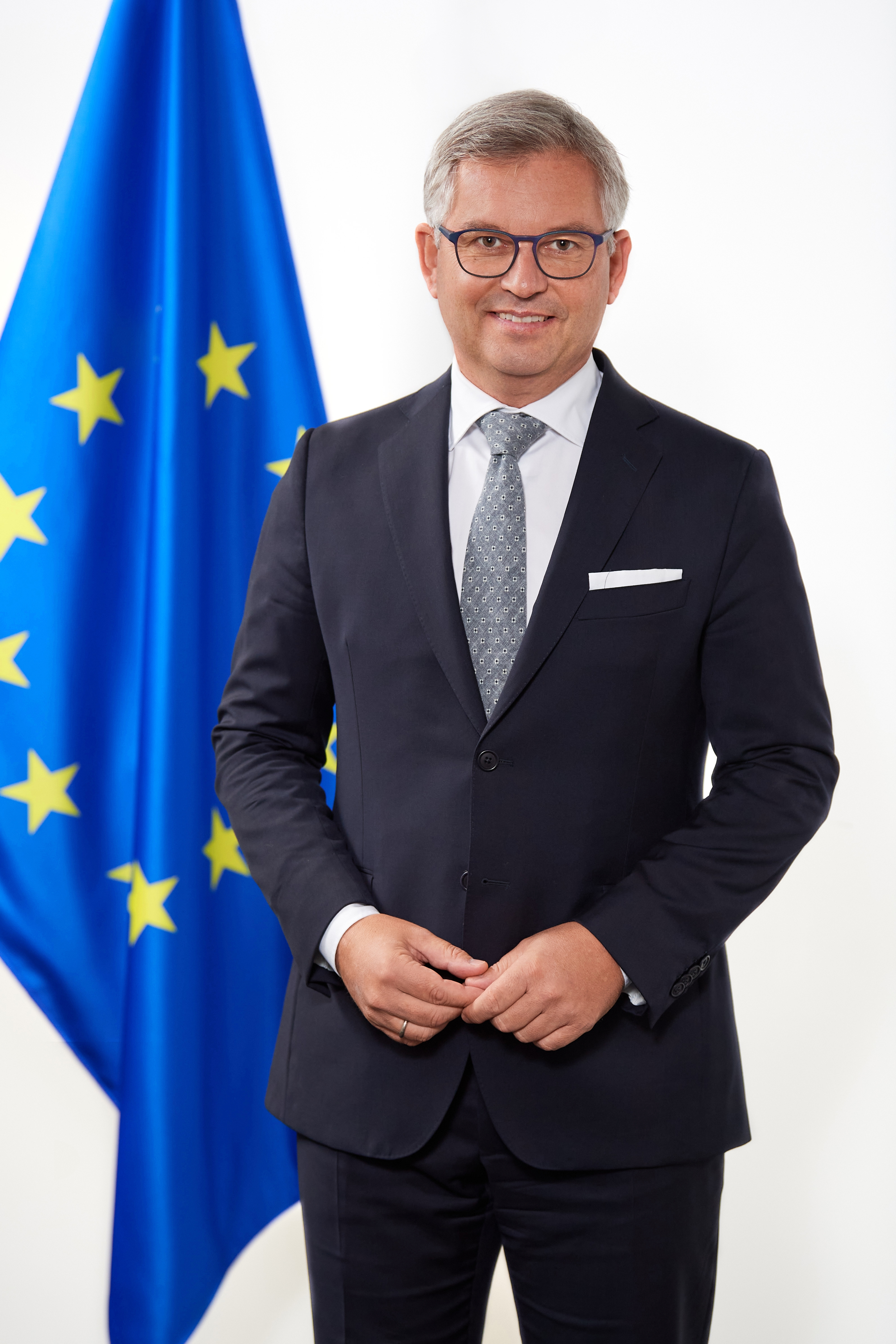
- Official portrait, 2024

European Commissioner for Internal Affairs and Migration
- Incumbent
- Assumed office 1 December 2024
- Commission: Von der Leyen II
- Preceded by: Ylva Johansson

Minister of Finance
- In office 6 December 2021 – 20 November 2024
- Chancellor: Karl Nehammer
- Preceded by: Gernot Blümel
- Succeeded by: Gunter Mayr (acting)

State Secretary for Climate Action and Energy
- In office 7 January 2020 – 6 December 2021
- Chancellor: Sebastian Kurz; Alexander Schallenberg

Member of the Federal Council
- In office 1 May 2009 – 6 January 2020
- Preceded by: Jürgen Weiss
- Succeeded by: Christine Schwarz-Fuchs
- Constituency: Vorarlberg

Personal details
- Born: Magnus Oswald Brunner; 6 May 1972 (age 54) Höchst, Vorarlberg, Austria
- Party: ÖVP
- Education: University of Innsbruck; University of Vienna; King's College London

Magnus Oswald Brunner (German: [ˈmaɡnʊs ˈbʁʊnɐ]; born 6 May 1972) is an Austrian politician of the Austrian People's Party (ÖVP) who has been European Commissioner for Internal Affairs and Migration since December 2024. Previously, he served as Austria's finance minister from 2021 until 2024 in the government of Chancellor Karl Nehammer.

== Early life and education ==
Brunner studied jurisprudence at the University of Innsbruck, the University of Vienna (Dr. iur.) and King's College London (LLM).

== Political career ==
=== In Austria ===
Brunner was a member of the Federal Council for the Austrian People's Party (ÖVP) from 1 May 2009 until 6 January 2020.

He served as state secretary (Staatssekretär) in the Ministry of Climate Action, Environment, Energy, Mobility, Innovation, and Technology in the government of Chancellor Sebastian Kurz.

=== In Europe ===
Following the 2024 European elections, the Austrian government nominated Brunner as the country's European Commissioner serving under President Ursula von der Leyen. Some journalists made Brunner in part responsible for the handling of Austria's desolate finances and concluded that he was the wrong choice for the position as European Commissioner.

In July 2025, Brunner was among several European officials declared "persona non grata" by the Government of National Stability in eastern Libya after he and the said officials held an earlier meeting with officials of the rival Government of National Unity in Tripoli.

As European Commissioner, Brunner has advocated for "return hubs" in countries outside the EU for migrants who have been ordered to be deported from the EU. In 2026 he stated: "People who do not have the right to stay in the European Union must be returned effectively. (…) This is what EU citizens expect, and that is what we must deliver."

In his capacity as EU Commissioner, Brunner has been involved in the implementation of the EU–India comprehensive framework of cooperation on mobility, signed in January 2026 as part of the India–European Union Free Trade Agreement. The framework facilitates legal pathways for skilled workers, young professionals, and seasonal workers seeking employment in labour-shortage sectors across the European Union. In February 2026, the European Commission established the European Legal Gateway Office in New Delhi to connect Indian talent with EU employers, a move Brunner described as a "new level of mutually beneficial cooperation." In May 2026, Brunner met with India's Minister of State for External Affairs, Kirti Vardhan Singh, on the margins of a United Nations forum in New York to review bilateral cooperation and discuss migration and mobility governance under the framework.

Brunner oversaw the entry into application of the European Pact on Migration and Asylum on 12 June 2026, describing the comprehensive reform as the beginning of a broader operational implementation process. He emphasized strict compliance with the new rules, noting that the pact establishes a comprehensive and legally binding European framework for all member states, with the European Commission supporting and monitoring national implementation plans. Brunner wants to expand the European Border and Coast Guard Agency to become the leading agency for coordinating the return of migrants without the right to reside. A "European Return Coordination Center", in which Frontex will play a central role, is to be created while budgeting problems continue. Austria insists that the Commission carry out a significant reduction in staff.

In June 2026, amid the Ukrainian conscription crisis, Brunner presented a European Commission proposal to extend the Temporary Protection Directive, an emergency mechanism granting collective asylum to displaced persons fleeing the Russo-Ukrainian War, until March 2028. The proposal would exclude newly arriving Ukrainian men aged 23 to 60 subject to mobilization from automatic temporary protection, at the request of the Ukrainian government. Brunner stated: "This is what Ukraine has asked us to do, and this is what we are doing."

== Other activities ==
=== European Union organizations ===
- European Investment Bank (EIB), Ex-Officio Member of the Board of Governors (since 2021)
- European Stability Mechanism (ESM), Member of the Board of Governors (since 2021)

=== International organizations ===
- Asian Development Bank (ADB), Ex-Officio Member of the Board of Governors (since 2021)
- European Bank for Reconstruction and Development (EBRD), Ex-Officio Member of the Board of Governors (since 2021)
- Inter-American Development Bank (IDB), Ex-Officio Member of the Board of Governors (since 2021)
- Multilateral Investment Guarantee Agency (MIGA), World Bank Group, Ex-Officio Member of the Board of Governors (since 2021)
- World Bank, Ex-Officio Member of the Board of Governors (since 2021)

=== Non-profit organizations ===
- National Fund of the Republic of Austria for Victims of National Socialism, Member of the Board of Trustees (since 2021)

== Honours ==
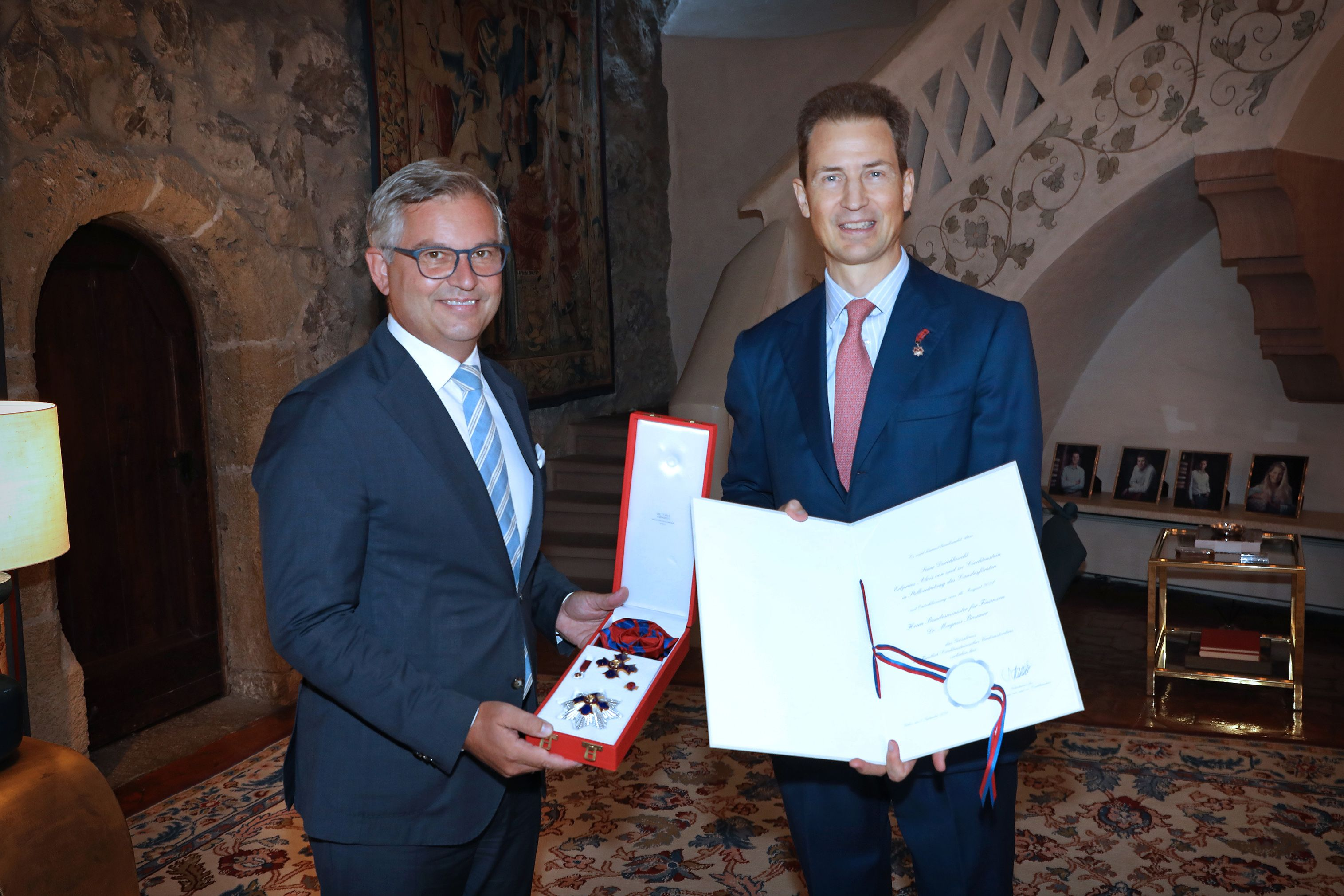
Brunner receiving the Order of Merit of the Principality of Liechtenstein from Alois, Hereditary Prince of Liechtenstein on 2 September 2024

- Liechtenstein: Grand Cross of the Order of Merit of the Principality of Liechtenstein (2024)

Political offices
Preceded by Gernot Blümel	Minister of Finance; 2021–2024	Succeeded by Gunter Mayr (acting)
Preceded by Johannes Hahn	Austrian European Commissioner; 2024–present	Incumbent
Preceded by Ylva Johansson	European Commissioner for Internal Affairs and Migration; 2024–present	Incumbent
