= Gernot Blümel =

Austrian politician (born 1981)

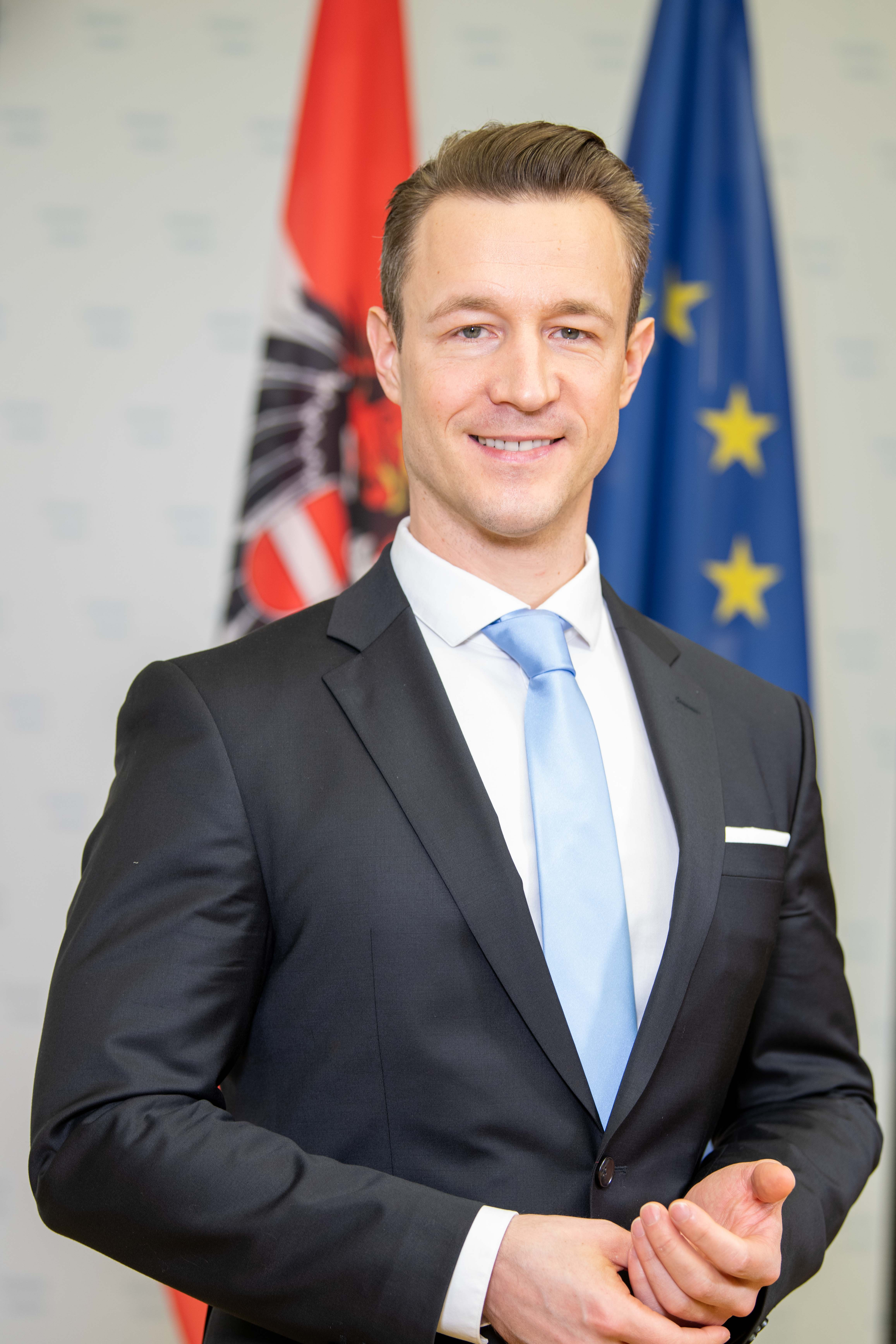
- Blümel in 2020

Minister of Finance
- In office 7 January 2020 – 6 December 2021
- Chancellor: Sebastian Kurz; Alexander Schallenberg
- Preceded by: Eduard Müller
- Succeeded by: Magnus Brunner

Minister for European Affairs, Art, Culture and Media
- In office 18 December 2017 – 3 June 2019
- Chancellor: Sebastian Kurz
- Preceded by: Thomas Drozda
- Succeeded by: Alexander Schallenberg

General Secretary of the Austrian People's Party
- In office 6 December 2013 – 15 October 2015
- Chairman: Reinhold Mitterlehner; Sebastian Kurz
- Preceded by: Johannes Rauch
- Succeeded by: Peter McDonald

Personal details
- Born: 24 October 1981 (age 44) Vienna, Austria
- Party: Austrian People's Party
- Domestic partner: Clivia Treidl
- Children: 2
- Education: University of Vienna (Mag. phil.); Vienna University of Economics and Business (MBA)

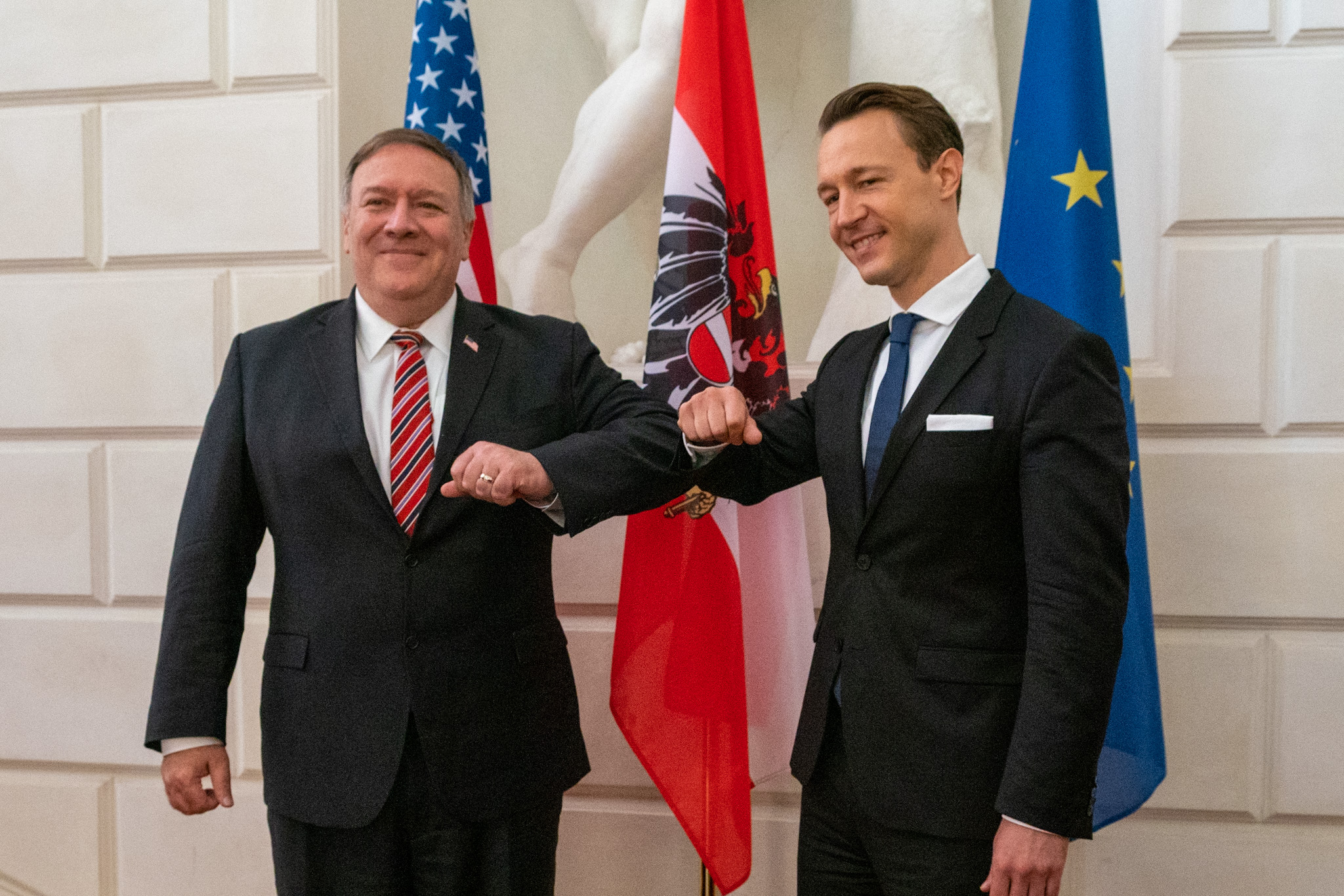
Blümel meets with U.S. Secretary of State Michael R. Pompeo ahead of a business roundtable with Austrian companies in Vienna, Austria on August 14, 2020.

Gernot Blümel (born 24 October 1981) is an Austrian politician of the Austrian People's Party (ÖVP). He served as Austria's finance minister from 2020 to 2021, having announced his resignation shortly after Alexander Schallenberg's resignation on 2 December 2021. Since 2015, he has been the chairman of the Vienna branch of the ÖVP. Prior, he was Chancellery minister for European Affairs, Art, Culture, and Media from 2017 to 2019; he was also General Secretary of the ÖVP from 2013 to 2015.

== Education and personal life ==
Blümel attended elementary school in his home town of Moosbrunn, Lower Austria. He attended the Don Bosco Salesian high school in Unterwaltersdorf, where he graduated in 2000. After completing military service in the Austrian Armed Forces, he studied philosophy at the University of Vienna and the University of Burgundy in Dijon, and graduated in 2009 with a master's degree. He then studied at the Executive Academy of the Vienna University of Economics and Business, and graduated with a Master of Business Administration degree.

Blümel is a member of the Catholic students' union KaV Norica Vienna. Since 2014 he has been in a relationship with journalist, presenter, and spokeswoman Clivia Treidl. On 2 March 2020, the couple became parents of a daughter and in September 2021 of a son.

== Political career ==
Blümel began his political career in the ÖVP's youth branch, the Young People's Party (JVP). As its international secretary, he has been a member of the national board since 2006. From 2006 to 2008 Blümel was active in the National Council, first as a parliamentary employee and then in the office of the Second President of the National Council Michael Spindelegger of the ÖVP. From 2009, Blümel was a consultant for the Federal Ministry for European and International Affairs. He was also Vice President of the Youth of the European People's Party (YEPP) from 2008 to 2010. In June 2011, Blümel was entrusted with the tasks of "Council of Ministers coordination and government work" in the cabinet of then-Vice Chancellor Spindelegger.

=== General-Secretary of the ÖVP ===
On 6 December 2013, the federal party executive of the ÖVP appointed Blümel as General Secretary. After leader Michael Spindelegger's resignation in September 2014, Blümel was confirmed as General Secretary by new chairman-designate Reinhold Mitterlehner at the meeting of the federal party executive. In the 2014 European elections, Blümel was campaign manager for the ÖVP.

During his time as General Secretary, Blümel was also media spokesman in the ÖVP parliamentary group. He presented the media package "More Programs for Austria" on 31 July 2014, seeking to relax restrictions and strengthen competition within Austrian media. He also sought to loosen restrictions on Österreichischer Rundfunk, the public broadcaster, and encourage more high-quality domestically-produced media in Austria. He also called for an ancillary copyright to protect journalistic content and intellectual property on the internet; to this end, he prioritized a European solution over a national one.

In his capacity as General Secretary, Blümel initiated a program known as "Evolution People's Party" to further develop the party's program. According to the ÖVP, this gave party members and non-members alike the opportunity to contribute their ideas and suggestions for a new party program. In spring 2015, at the party congress on the 70th anniversary of the ÖVP's foundation, a new basic program was adopted.

After the ÖVP's abysmal result in the 2015 Viennese state election, Blümel replaced Manfred Juraczka as regional party chairman of the party's branch there. He thus left office as General Secretary and was succeeded by Peter McDonald.

=== ÖVP leader in Vienna ===
On 12 October 2015, Blümel was appointed to succeed Manfred Juraczka, who resigned as regional party chairman of the Vienna ÖVP on the evening of the election. The ÖVP won just 9.2% of votes, its worst ever result in a state election. Blümel served as non-executive city councillor in the Häupl VI cabinet; Markus Wölbitsch succeeded him in this position on 25 January 2018.

In December 2018, Blümel was announced as the ÖVP's lead candidate for the October 2020 state election. The ÖVP won 20.4% in the election, more than twice as high as its 2015 result, and became the second largest party for the first time since the 2005 election.

=== Federal politics ===
Blümel was one of the ÖVP's five-member steering committee for government formation after the 2017 federal election, alongside leader Sebastian Kurz, Elisabeth Köstinger, Stefan Steiner, and Bettina Glatz-Kremsner. The ÖVP ultimately came to a coalition agreement with the Freedom Party of Austria (FPÖ). Blümel was initially appointed as Minister for Art, Culture, the Constitution, and the Media in the first Kurz government, but after reorganisation of ministries, less than a month later he was re-appointed as Chancellery minister for European Affairs, Art, Culture, and Media. In this capacity, Blümel was a proponent of the upload filters provided for in Draft Article 13 of the European Union copyright reform. Blümel also served as government coordinator, the main conduit for policy discussions between the ruling parties.

After the defeat of the first Kurz government, Blümel retained his position in the acting government of Hartwig Löger, and left office on 3 June 2019.

Blümel was elected to the National Council in the 2019 federal election. He resigned on 7 January 2020 when he was appointed finance minister in the second Kurz government. His seat in the National Council was taken over by Romana Deckbacher. Blümel stepped down as finance minister on 6 December 2021.

=== Investigations found no basis for suspected bribery ===
On 11 February 2021 Blümel's apartment in Vienna was searched by the Austrian public prosecutor. The public prosecutor's office suspected that Blümel and Austrian gambling company Novomatic might be involved in bribery. Blümel said that Novomatic hadn't donated any funds to ÖVP since Blümel became chairman of the Viennese ÖVP and Kurz became chairman of the ÖVP and refused to step down at the time. In September 2023, following a thorough investigation, no evidence of bribery was found and the matter was considered closed.

== Other activities ==
=== European Union organizations ===
- European Investment Bank (EIB), Ex-Officio Member of the Board of Governors (since 2020)
- European Stability Mechanism (ESM), Member of the Board of Governors (since 2020)

=== International organizations ===
- Asian Development Bank (ADB), Ex-Officio Member of the Board of Governors (2020–2021)
- Asian Infrastructure Investment Bank (AIIB), Ex-Officio Member of the Board of Governors (2020–2021)
- European Bank for Reconstruction and Development (EBRD), Ex-Officio Member of the Board of Governors (2020–2021)
- IDB Invest, Ex-Officio Member of the Board of Governors (2020–2021)
- Multilateral Investment Guarantee Agency (MIGA), World Bank Group, Ex-Officio Member of the Board of Governors (2020–2021)
- World Bank, Ex-Officio Member of the Board of Governors (2020–2021)

=== Non-profit organizations ===
- National Fund of the Republic of Austria for Victims of National Socialism, Member of the Board of Trustees (since 2020)

== Sources ==
- https://www.bundeskanzleramt.gv.at/bundesminister-gernot-bluemel
- https://web.archive.org/web/20131211225631/http://youthepp.eu/sites/default/files/library/YEPP_YB_2010_v6%2528LR%2529%2B%25284%2529.pdf
- https://derstandard.at/2000070950432/Kneissl-und-Bluemel-wollen-beide-Weisungshoheit-nach-Bruessel-haben

Party political offices
| Preceded by Johannes Rauch | General Secretary of the People's Party; 2013–2015 | Succeeded by Peter McDonald |
Political offices
| Preceded by Eduard Müller | Minister of Finance; 2020–2021 | Succeeded by Magnus Brunner |
