= Helmut Ettl =

Austrian economist

Financial Market Authority (Austria)

Executive Director
- Incumbent
- Assumed office 14 February 2008 Co-leader with Eduard Müller
- Preceded by: Heinrich Traumüller

Personal details
- Born: 23 August 1965 (age 61) Linz, Austria

Helmut Ettl (born August 23, 1965 in Linz) is an Austrian economist and European banking and finance specialist.

== Early life ==
Helmut Ettl grew up in Linz and was very active in his youth in the Socialist Youth Austria and in the student movement. Ettl was the school and state school spokesman and co-founder of the Linz cultural center Kapu (a center for independent music and punk music). He completed his studies in economics at the Johannes Kepler University in Linz.

== Career ==
In 1995 he joined the Oesterreichische Nationalbank in the “Department for the Analysis of Economic Developments Abroad” with a focus on analyzing the economic development of Western Europe. In 2000 he was appointed assistant director and the following year he was appointed deputy head of the banking analysis and auditing department. After stays at the International Monetary Fund in Washington and the EU Commission in Brussels, he graduated from the London School of Economics. In 2003 he was appointed head of the department for bank analysis and auditing. Since 2008 and since the extensions in 2013, 2017 and 2022, Ettl has been executive director of the Austrian Financial Market Authority (FMA), since 2011 a member of the Board of Supervisors of the European Banking Authority (EBA) and the General Board of the European Systemic Risk Board (ESRB) and since 2014 member of the Supervisory Board of the Single Supervisory Mechanism (SSM) of the European Central Bank (ECB).

Ettl referred in a timely manner to the problems with Bitcoin, Brexit, Lehmann Brothers and the budgetary policy of the EU and individual European states.

Ettl was appointed Vice-Chairperson of the European Banking Authority (EBA) in July 2023 for a two-and-a-half year term, and re-appointed for a second term in December 2025;
