= HYPO Steiermark =

Austrian bank based in Styria providing private banking

Landes-Hypothekenbank Steiermark A.G.
- Trade name: HYPO Steiermark
- Company type: Aktiengesellschaft
- Industry: Financial services
- Founded: 1931
- Headquarters: 15-17 Radetzkystraße, Graz, Austria
- Services: Banking
- Net income: ▲€3,787,454.62 (2015)
- Total assets: ▼€4,026,382,640.61 (2015)
- Total equity: ▲€169.927 million (2015)
- Owner: Raiffeisen-Landesbank Steiermark (75%); Styria (25%)
- Capital ratio: 8.21% (CET1)
- Website: hypobank.at
- Footnotes / references source

Landes-Hypothekenbank Steiermark A.G. known as HYPO Steiermark is an Austrian bank based in Graz, Styria (German: Steiermark). The bank was specialized in mortgage. Nowadays it provides private banking.

In 2015 the bank sold the minority stake in Raiffeisen Zentralbank.

The bank was owned by Styria. Nowadays Raiffeisen-Landesbank Steiermark owned 75% stake minus 1 share.
