= Eduard Müller (Austrian politician) =

Finance minister of Austria

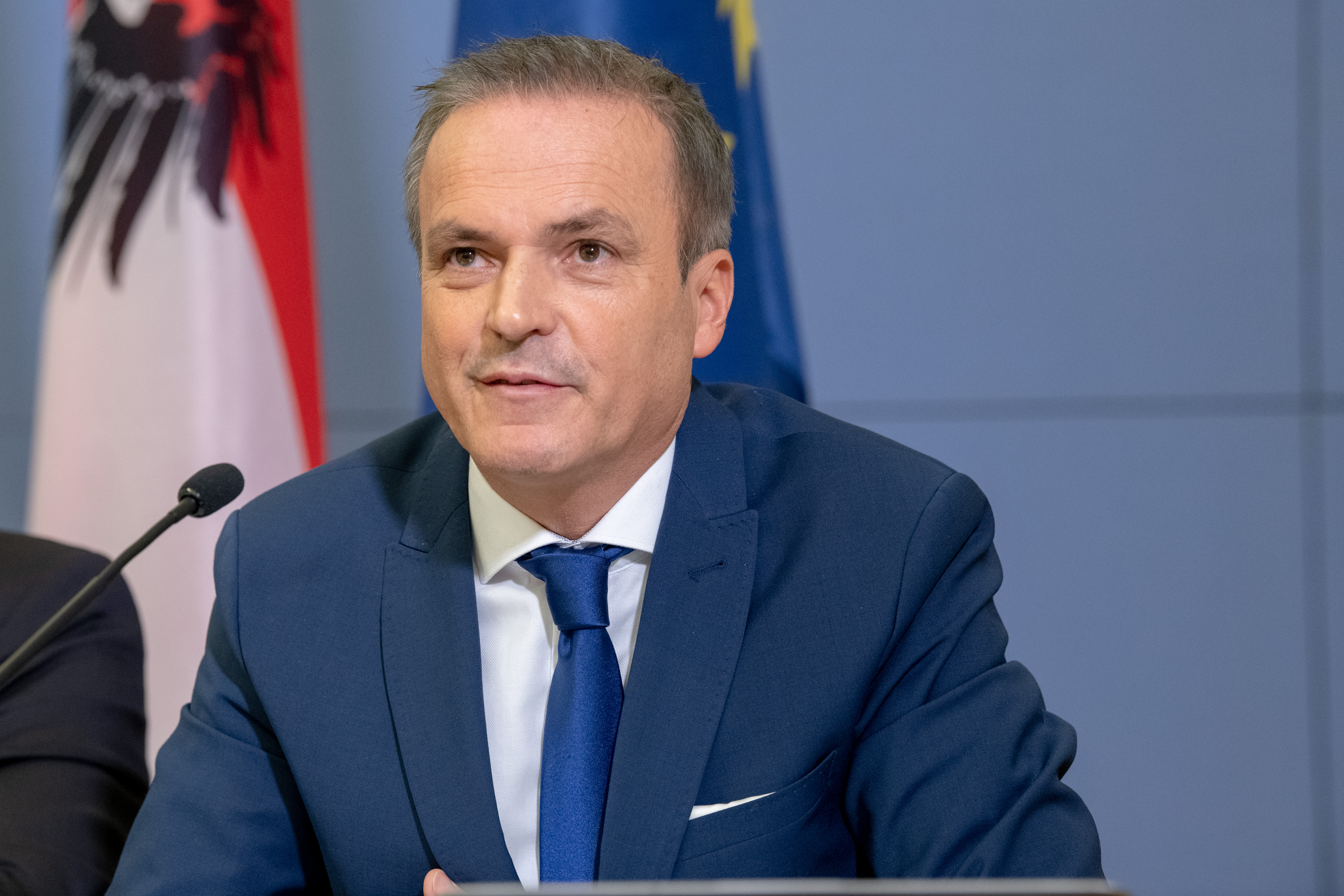
- Eduard Müller (2019)

Minister of Finance
- In office 3 June 2019 – 7 January 2020
- Chancellor: Brigitte Bierlein
- Preceded by: Hartwig Löger
- Succeeded by: Gernot Blümel

Minister of the Civil Service and Sports
- In office 3 June 2019 – 7 January 2020
- Chancellor: Brigitte Bierlein
- Preceded by: Juliane Bogner-Strauß
- Succeeded by: Werner Kogler

Personal details
- Born: 31 August 1962 (age 63) Oberwart, Burgenland, Austria
- Education: University of Hagen

Eduard Müller (born 31 August 1962) is an Austrian civil servant, politician and author. He served as Minister of Finance in 2019. He also managed the Ministry of Civil Service and Sports. Since 2020, he is one of two executive directors of the Austrian Financial Market Authority (FMA).

== Life ==
Müller was born in Oberwart and attended elementary school in Rumpersdorf before attending Handelsakademie, a vocational high school for business and commerce. He graduated from Handelsakademie in 1981 and worked as a tax inspector in Oberwart until 1994. He began his studies at the University of Hagen with a major in economics. He received a Diplom-Kaufmann in 1994 and a Master of Business Administration in 2012.

In 1994 he moved to the Financial Directorate in Vienna and then to the Ministry of Finance in 1997. From 2001 to 2005 he was the leader of the project to reform the Ministry of Finance, and from 2002 to 2013 he led the Tax and Customs Administration in the Ministry of Finance. In November 2013 he became the managing director of Linde Publishing for whom he authored a number of specialist publications on tax law such as the SteuerSparBuch (Tax Savings Book) for those paying payroll tax or who are self-employed. He returned to the Ministry of Finance in October 2015 when then-Finance Minister Hans Jörg Schelling made him Section Chief. That same year he served as chair of the federal examination board for auditors and tax professionals as well as Deputy Secretary General of the Ministry of Finance.

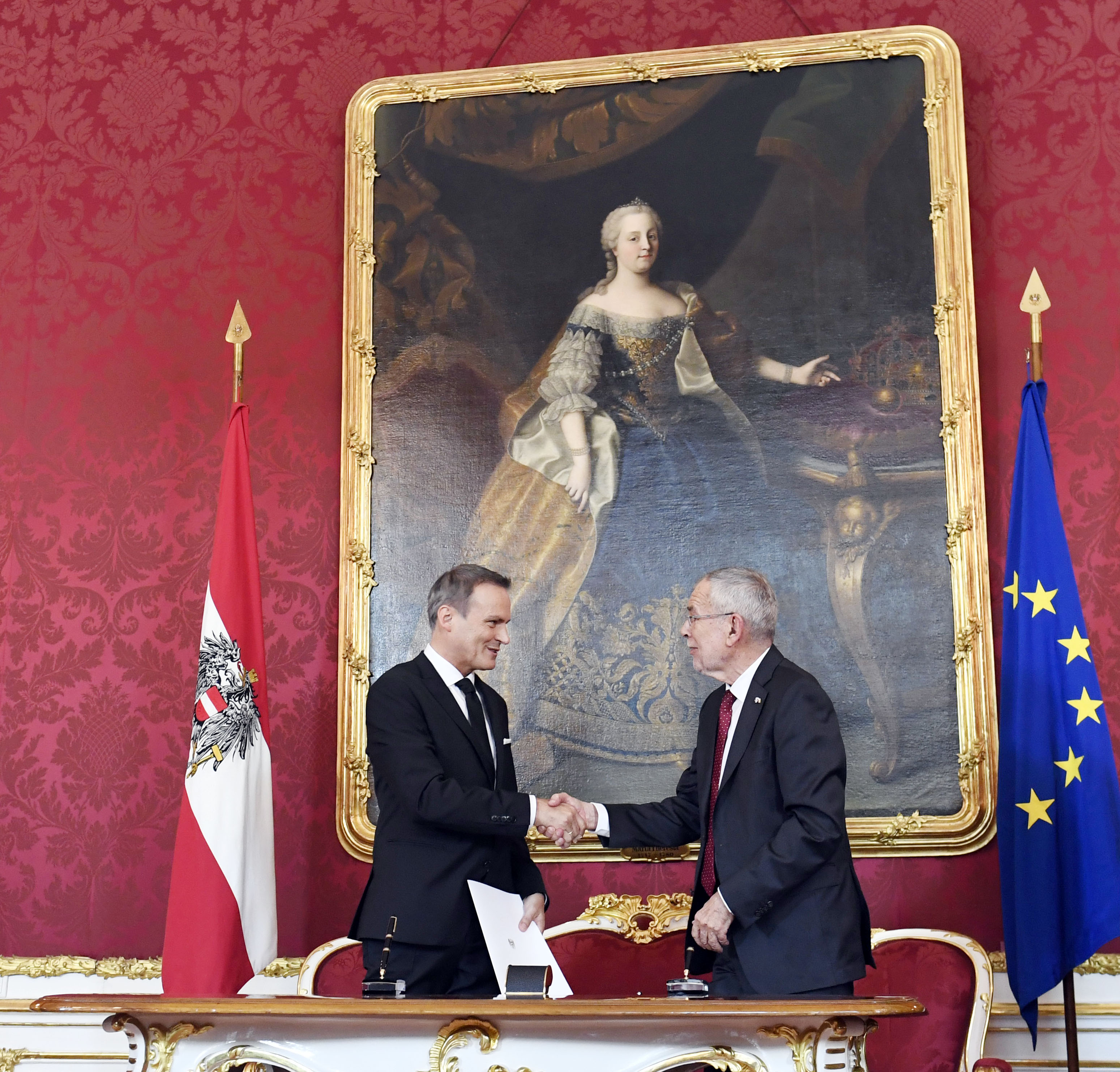
Eduard Müller (left) at his swearing-in with Austrian president Alexander Van der Bellen (2019)

In June 2019, Müller began serving as Austria's minister of finance in the Bierlein government where he was also tasked with managing the Ministry of Civil Service and Sports. He left office on 7 January 2020 following the formation of the second Kurz government. From February 2020, he co-headed the FMA on an interim basis. In May 2020, he was appointed as one of the FMA's two executive directors.

== Other activities ==
=== European Union organizations ===
- European Investment Bank (EIB), ex officio member of the board of governors (since 2019)
- European Stability Mechanism (ESM), member of the board of governors (since 2019)

=== International organizations ===
- Asian Development Bank (ADB), ex officio member of the board of governors (2019-2020)
- Asian Infrastructure Investment Bank (AIIB), ex officio member of the board of governors (2019-2020)
- Inter-American Investment Corporation (IIC), ex officio member of the board of governors (2019-2020)
- Joint World Bank–IMF Development Committee, chair (2019-2020)
- Multilateral Investment Guarantee Agency (MIGA), World Bank Group, ex officio member of the board of governors (2019-2020)
- World Bank, ex officio member of the board of governors (2019-2020)

=== Non-profit organizations ===
- National Fund of the Republic of Austria for Victims of National Socialism, ex officio member of the board of trustees

== Personal life ==
His brother, Wilhelm Müller, is mayor of Weiden bei Rechnitz.
