= Raiffeisenlandesbank Oberösterreich =

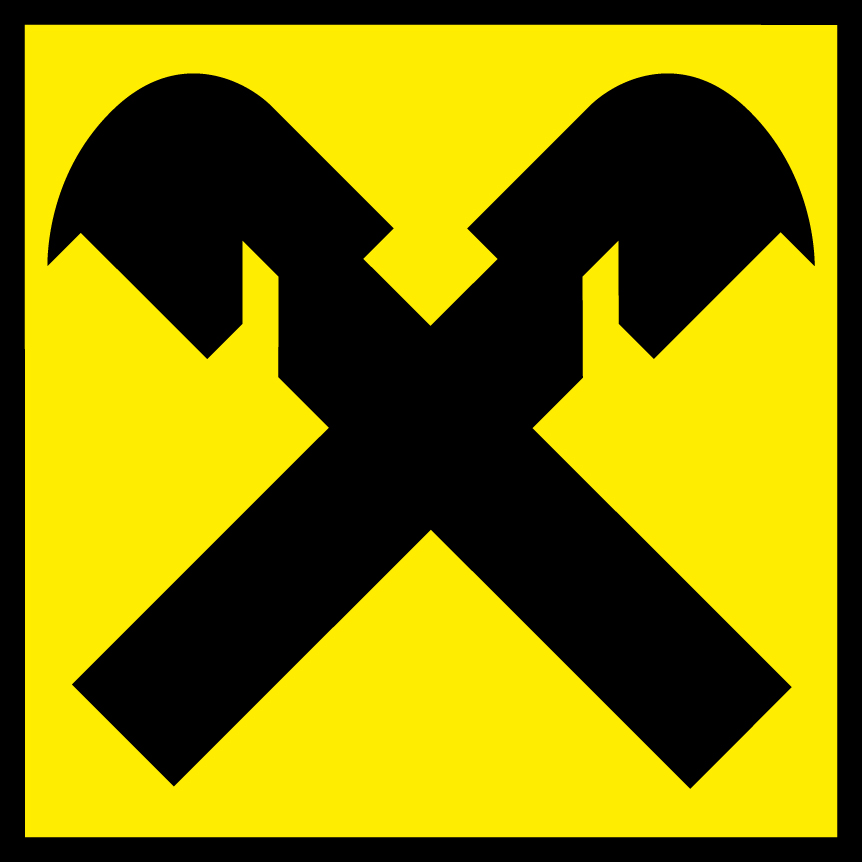

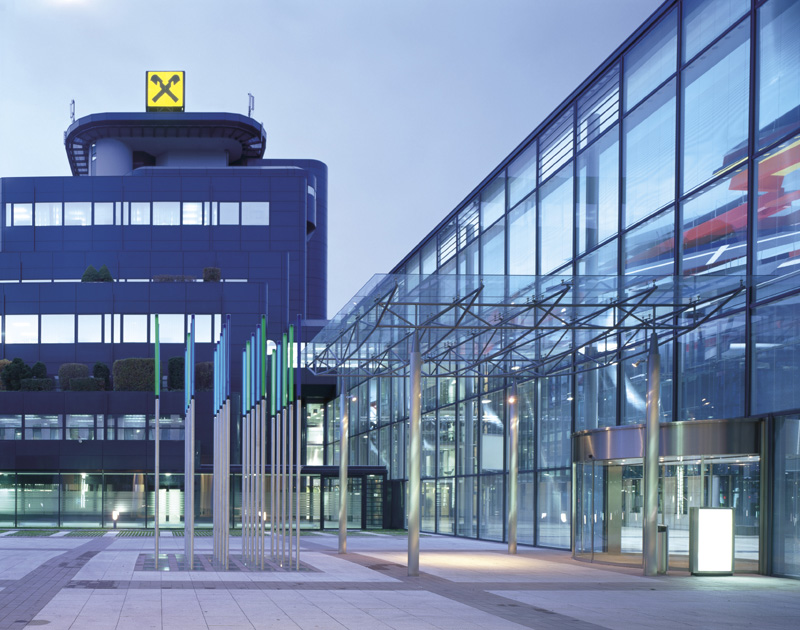
- Company type: Aktiengesellschaft
- Industry: Asset management, cooperative banking
- Founded: 1990
- Headquarters: Linz, Austria
- Total assets: €49.285 billion (2024)
- Number of employees: 88 (2019)
- Parent: Raiffeisen Zentralbank (until 2017); Raiffeisen Bankengruppe
- Website: www.raiffeisen.at/ooe/rlb/de/

Raiffeisenlandesbank Oberösterreich AG (lit. 'Raiffeisen State Bank of Upper Austria', RLB OÖ) is a credit institution and grouping of cooperative banks founded in the 1900s and headquartered in Linz, Austria. It is the central institution of the Raiffeisen Banking Group in Upper Austria and the largest of Austria's eight provincial central banks.

RLB OÖ has been designated as a Significant Institution since the entry into force of European Banking Supervision in late 2014, and as a consequence is directly supervised by the European Central Bank.

== Structure ==
Raiffeisenlandesbank Oberösterreich AG is owned by the Upper Austrian Raiffeisen banks. These banks are organized as cooperatives and are owned by people in the region, known as co-owners.

In addition to serving individual customers, Raiffeisenlandesbank Oberösterreich also assists in both private and corporate banking.

== History ==
The bank was founded in the 20th century as an office for equalization payments and monetary equalization.

The bank moved into the Südbahnhofmarkt location under the name Raiffeisen Zentralkasse. In the following years Raiffeisen Zentralkasse's field of activity and locations were expanded. In 1988, the bank's name changed from Raiffeisen Zentralkasse Oberösterreich to Raiffeisenlandesbank Oberösterreich. A year later, a ground-breaking ceremony took place for the extension to Linz's Südbahnhof railway station, which was completed in 1990. In the same year, a representative office was opened in Budweis.

In 1991, the opening of a bank in the German city of Passau laid the foundation for successful business development in Bavaria, Germany. Raiffeisenlandesbank Oberösterreich now has eight branches in Bavaria and Baden-Württemberg: Augsburg, Passau, Nuremberg, Munich, Regensburg, Würzburg, Ulm and Heilbronn. Its developmental achievements in Germany have been honored several times with the "Bank of the Year" award in the Großer Preis des Mittelstandes competition.

Raiffeisenbank A.S., in which Raiffeisenlandesbank Oberösterreich has a stake, was founded in the Czech Republic in 1993. Another division was established in 1995 with the founding of Privat Bank AG, which offers customers sophisticated private banking and many special services. Kepler Fonds KAG was founded in 1998. Raiffeisenlandesbank Oberösterreich was transformed into a public limited company in 2004.

From 1985 to 2012, Ludwig Scharinger was CEO and chairman of the managing board of Raiffeisenlandesbank Oberösterreich. Heinrich Schaller succeeded him in this function on March 31, 2012.

== See also ==
- List of banks in Austria
- List of banks in the euro area
