= Gunter Mayr =

Austrian economist (born 1972)

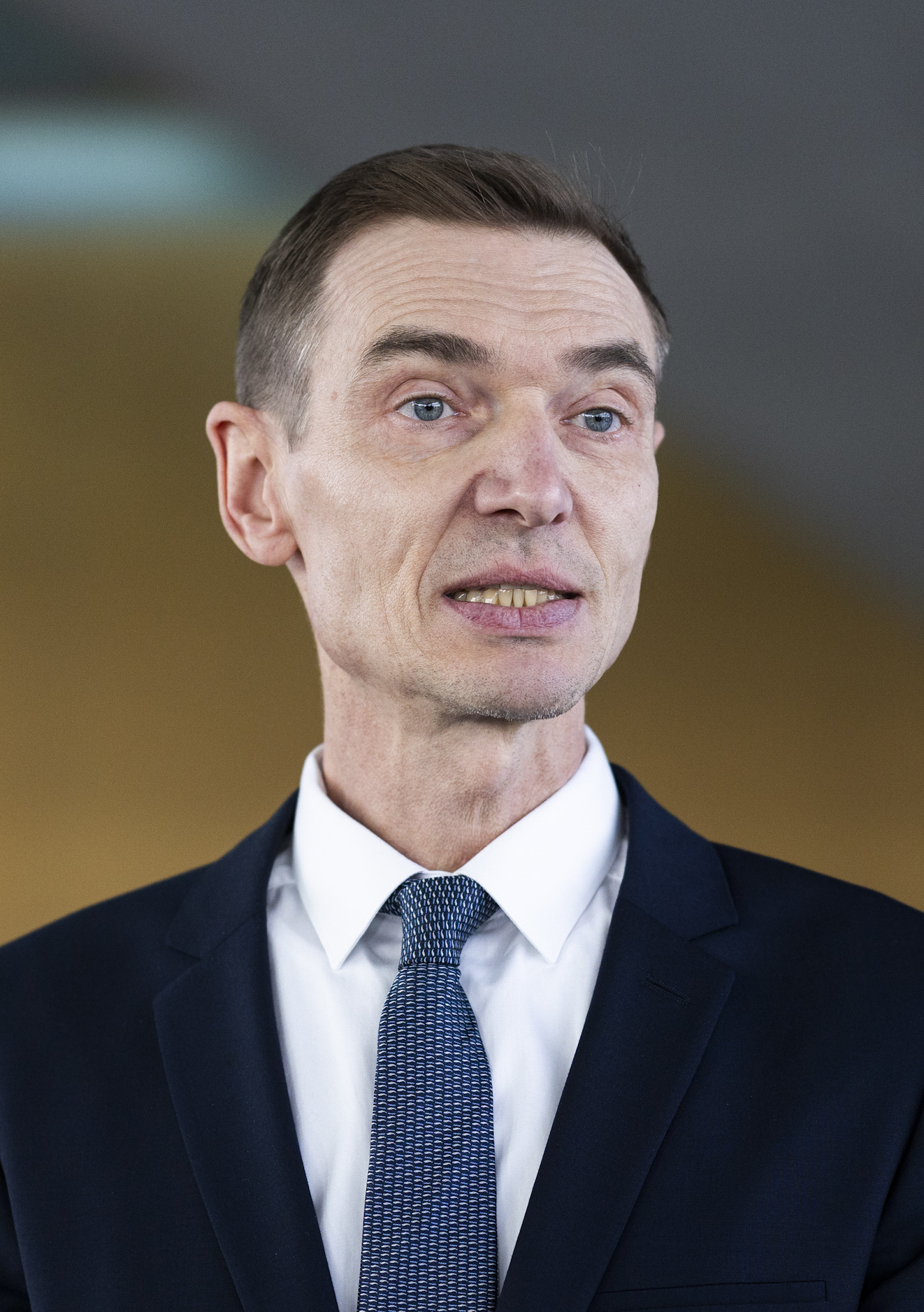
- Mayr in 2025

Minister of Finance
- In office 20 November 2024 – 3 March 2025
- Chancellor: Karl Nehammer; Alexander Schallenberg (acting)
- Preceded by: Magnus Brunner
- Succeeded by: Markus Marterbauer

Personal details
- Born: 25 January 1972 (age 54)
- Education: University of Innsbruck

Gunter Mayr (born 25 January 1972) is an Austrian economist who served as interim minister of finance from November 2024 to March 2025.

== Early life and career ==
Mayr was born in Innsbruck in 1972, and graduated from the University of Innsbruck with a degree in legal science and business economics. He began working for the Ministry of Finance in 2003, and was appointed head of the tax policy and tax law department in 2012. In 2009, he became a professor of financial law at the University of Vienna.
