= Andrey Kozlov =

Russian banker (1965–2006)

Andrey Andreyevich Kozlov (Russian: Андре́й Андре́евич Козло́в; January 6, 1965 – September 14, 2006) was the first deputy chairman of the Central Bank of the Russian Federation from 1997 to 1999 and again in 2002 to 2006.

Kozlov was fluent in Russian, German, and English. He was married, and had three children. Kozlov was assassinated in 2006.

== Career ==
Kozlov was born in Moscow and served in the Soviet Army from 1983 to 1985. He then attended the faculty of international economics at Moscow Institute of Finance, where he graduated in 1989. He began working at the Soviet Union's central bank in the same year as a senior economist. He left the Bank of Russia in 1999 to work in the private sector, before returning to the Bank of Russia in April 2002.

Kozlov introduced a deposit insurance system and founded the Deposit Insurance Agency to restore public faith in the banking system after the 1998 Russian financial crisis. Kozlov prevented other banks from continuing operation by denying them access to the deposit insurance system. As head of bank supervision, Kozlov withdrew licences from banks suspected of money laundering and other crimes. In 2004, Kozlov took control of Sodbiznesbank, accusing the bank of engaging in laundering ransom money from hostage-taking. In 2006 he revoked the license of VIP-Bank (formerly Neftyanoi Bank).

In 2005, Kommersant reported that Kozlov is "valued as a top-of-the-line professional. He is also given due credit as one of those who started the formation of the stock market in Russia." After his death, Kommersant credited Kozlov with combating "gray schemes," illegal importing practices that minimize customs duties and value-added tax payments.

On September 8, 2006, the Friday before his murder, Kozlov gave a speech at a banking conference in Sochi, saying, "Those who have been found out laundering criminal money should probably be barred from staying in the banking profession for life. Such people disgrace the banking system."

== Death ==
In June 2006, Kozlov flew to Tallinn, spoke with Andres Palumaa, who was in charge of Estonia's anti-money laundering Financial Supervisory Authority (FSA), and gave an ultimatum to Estonia's Chief Financial Officer Raul Malmstein to stop hundreds of billions of rubles, which are being money laundered starting in early 2006 from Russia through Estonia to the West, by closing the Estonian accounts with suspicious activity of two banks in Estonia: SEB Eesti Ühispank and Sampo Pank. Very large outflows occur during the year before a Russian presidential election and late 2007 was the next expected Russian presidential election. If Malmstein failed to stop the outflows from Russia to the West, then Kozlov would reveal the terrible banking structure in Estonia to the world (Russian: "каналами для отмывания в Европе и Америке денег преступных группировок"). Sampo Pankki shut down the accounts and eight accounts at SEB Eesti Ühispank were shut down until shortly after Kozlov's death on 14 September 2006 when the accounts were opened back up and auditors then stated that nothing was suspicious. In 2018, a scheme was revealed as the Danske Bank laundering network. (Note: In November 2006, Danske Bank acquired Sampo Pankki and the takeover was approved in February 2007. On 15 November 2012, Sampo Pank changed its name to Danske Bank Estonia.)

Raiffeisen Zentralbank (Raiffeisen Zentralbank Oesterreich AG) (RZB) in Austria and Diskont Bank in Russia have been accused of money laundering and a criminal investigation began on 8 September 2006. According to the Department of Economic Security of the Ministry of Internal Affairs, from 30 June 2006 to 29 August 2006, more than $1.5 billion transited the Solange LLC and Saturn-M LLC accounts at Diskont Bank to RZB accounts in Austria. On 31 August 2006, Andrey Kozlov revoked Diskont's license. Just five days after the criminal investigation into money laundering was opened, Kozlov was murdered. A very large amount of money had transited accounts with funds from the Nord Stream 1 project to finance the building of a pipeline from Vyborg, Russia, to Lubmin near Greifswald, Germany. According to Natalia Morar's 21 May 2007 article in The New Times, Alexander Bortnikov, who was an FSB deputy deputy director as head of its economic security department, and Vladimir Putin were money laundering Nord Stream 1 funds at both Raiffeisen Zentralbank (RZB) in Austria and Diskont Bank in Russia.

According to Svetlana Petrenko, spokeswoman for the Moscow prosecutor's office, two gunmen shot Kozlov in the head and neck at 8:50 PM, but other law enforcement officials claim Kozlov was shot at 8:30 PM. Inna Sergeyeva, deputy head doctor at the Hospital No. 33 in Moscow, said Kozlov later died of his injuries. Prime Minister Mikhail Fradkov ordered Prosecutor General Yury Chaika, who is personally prosecuting the case, to provide regular reports on the investigation.

Kozlov was near the Spartak sports center with his driver, Alexander Semyonov, when they were shot. Semyonov died at the scene and Kozlov died after doctors unsuccessfully performed emergency surgery. The police later found weapons they suspect were used in the attacks: a "handmade pistol and a modified Baikal pistol... in tall grass near the Spartak sports center, 250-300 meters away from the site of the incident, during the investigation of the crime scene."

Immediately after Kozlov's death, numerous media sources in Russia began explaining that Kozlov was killed in retaliation for recently shutting down some small banks and Russian authorities accused and arrested Alexei Frenkel of involvement in Kozlov's murder because Frenkel's VIP Bank (originally known as Vindobona Privatbank (VIP-Bank) in 1991) had been shut down in June 2006 because of suspicious money laundering activity. On 12 January 2007 after a court hearing, Frenkel proclaimed his innocence by stating "I am not guilty!"

Boris Gryzlov, speaker of the State Duma, the lower chamber of parliament, said, "The central bank revoked licenses of a number of banks, and it's quite possible that the gangsters linked to them might have put out a contract on him."

== Natalia Morar's investigations ==
When Natalia Morar investigated Raiffeisen Zentralbank, she was expelled and she says she received a death threat from the FSB.

== Tributes ==
Levan Zolotarev, a senior vice president at Russian Standard Bank, said, "Kozlov was a strong believer in reforming the financial markets of Russia. He pushed many radical changes that were important for the banking business." Zolotarev first met Kozlov when they studied at Moscow Financial Institute. Recently they worked together on amendments to a bankruptcy bill, which was to be voted on in the Duma in late 2006, making subordinated loans equivalent to capital. Finance Minister Alexei Kudrin described Kozlov as "a very courageous and honest personality, who has been on the frontline of the struggle against financial crimes," frequently damaging "the interests of dishonest financiers." Anatoly Chubais, Chairman of RAO UES, said Kozlov was "an undoubtedly honest, principled, and absolutely non-commercial man. He was one of the most professional people in the entire Russian banking sector," calling his assassination a "blatant challenge to the entire Russian government system. This is a case when the authorities must respond in a tough manner, promptly, and mercilessly." Mikhail Grishankov, a senior member of the lower chamber of parliament, said the assassination was a spit in the face of the state. Punishing the killers is a "matter of honor... This is a terrible murder of a person who protected interests of the state and opposed schemes used by some banks to legalize revenues of shadow and criminal business. Criminal groups that control those banks will stop at nothing." The Central Bank issued a statement applauding Kozlov for making a "huge contribution to the reform of the country's banking system, making it more effective, transparent and stable." Oleg V. Vyugin, Russia's chief securities regulator, in a telephone interview, said, "It was criminals taking revenge for the legal actions of the central bank, and unfortunately Mr. Kozlov paid the price."

== Trial ==
On October 28, 2008, a trial jury reached the verdict in the murder case. Banker Aleksei Frenkel, Liana Askerova and Boris Shafrai were found guilty of organizing Kozlov's murder, and Bogdan Pogorzhevsky, Aleksei Polovinkin, Maksim Proglyada and Aleksandr Belokopytov were found guilty of carrying it out. According to the prosecution, Frenkel organized the murder after his bank, VIP-Bank, lost its license on June 16, 2006 by Kozlov's decision (Kozlov accused the bank of money laundering). Frenkel asked his former co-worker, Askerova (who owned a restaurant at the time), to get him in touch with somebody who can kill Kozlov, and she found more intermediaries in Pogorzhevsky and Shafrai, who, in turn, found the shooters - Proglyada and Polovinkin. Frenkel paid $310,000 to Askerova, out of which $200,000 went to Pogorzhevsky, $90,000 to Askerova and only $20,000 to the shooters themselves. Another person involved, Andrei Kasmynin, was still not under arrest and was wanted by the police at the time of the trial. Based on the jury's verdict, the judge sentenced Frenkel to 19 years of imprisonment. Polovinkin received a life sentence, Proglyada - 24 years, Shafrai - 14 years, Askerova - 13 years, Belokopytov - 10 years, Pogorzhevsky - 6 years. The appeal was rejected by the Supreme Court of Russia on November 17, 2009. Proglyada's sentence was reduced to 22 years, all the other sentences were not changed. Kasmynin was eventually arrested and sentenced to 9 years of imprisonment on March 19, 2010.

On May 18, 2010, the investigators issued an indictment against 58-year-old Sergei Levin, who was one of the jurors in the Frenkel trial. Allegedly he tried to bribe other jurors to rule Frenkel not guilty, because he did not agree with the manner in which the judge carried out the trial. The bribe offer came to light during the trial and he was removed from the jury before they reached the verdict. Levin admitted his guilt during the investigation.

== See also ==
- Paul Klebnikov
- Vladislav Listyev
- Galina Starovoitova
