= Wienbibliothek im Rathaus =

Coordinates: 48°12′41″N 16°21′27″E

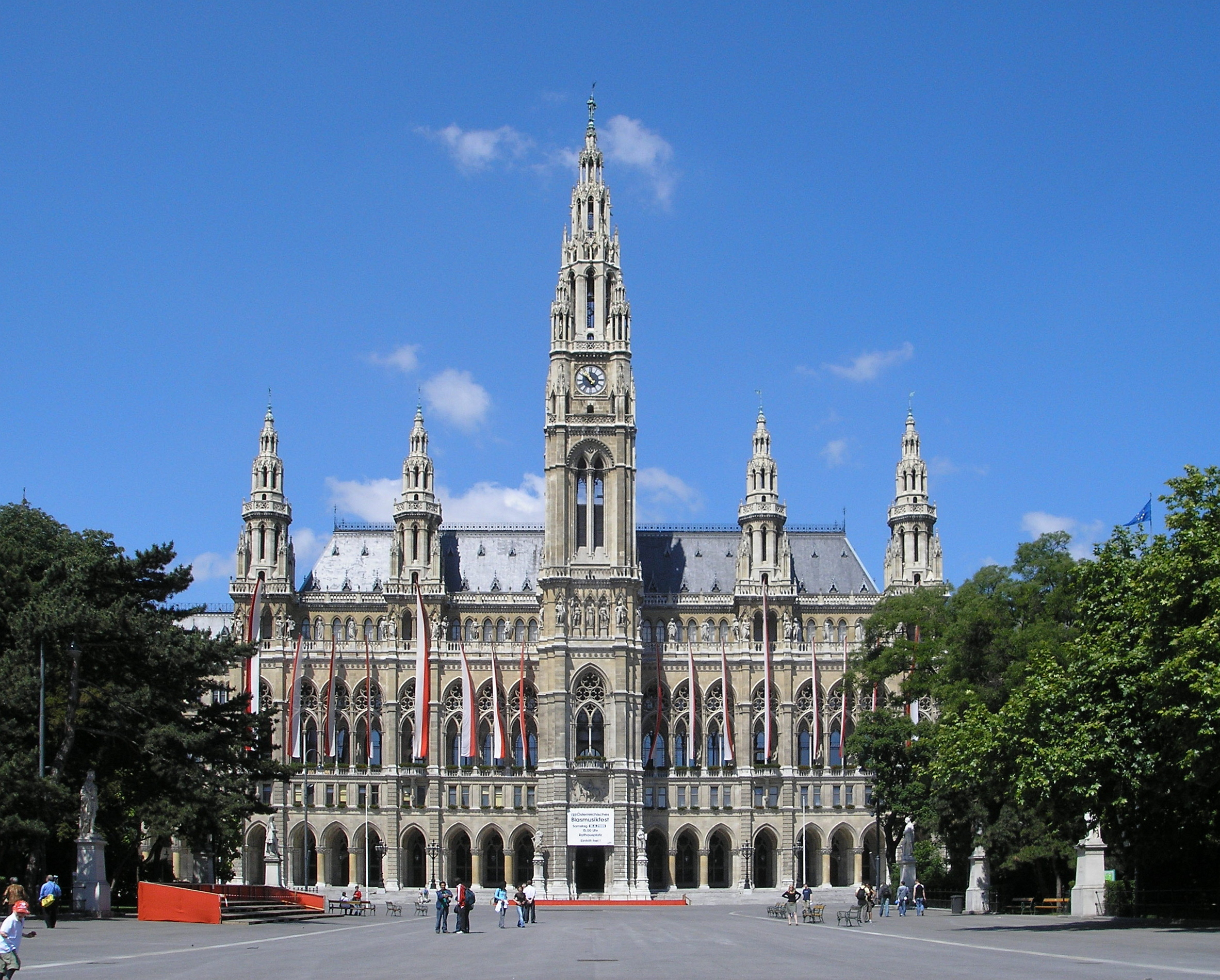
Wienbibliothek im Rathaus in Vienna, Austria

The Wienbibliothek im Rathaus (English: Vienna Library in City Hall), formerly known as the Wiener Stadt- und Landesbibliothek (English: Vienna City and State Library), is a library and archive containing important documents related to the history of Vienna, Austria. Founded in 1856, the library, which also contains a large collection of local memorabilia, is located in the Rathaus (City Hall) in the Innere Stadt first district of the city, and is the official library of the city and state of Vienna.

The Wienbibliothek preserves 500,000 books, 2,000 newspapers and magazines, 300,000 posters, 500,000 autographs, notable bequests and legacies, and one of the most important music collections in the world. Much of the collection can be retrieved through the online user interface available in both German and English. The library is part of the Magistrat der Stadt Wien (Municipality of Vienna) and supervised by the City Councillor for Culture.

== History ==
In 1856, the city parliament, led by Mayor Johann Kaspar Freiherr von Seiller, agreed on reinstalling a city library. In the beginning, it was accessible to officers of the city only. Therefore, it consisted mainly of juridical literature and Viennensia. These guidelines are still valid today.

In 1889, shortly after the transfer from the old to the new city hall, the city parliament decided to separate the city archives from the library and to create an own archive department. At the same time, the library was merged with the Historical Museum of the City of Vienna to what was called City Collections (Städtische Sammlungen). Subsequently, the library developed from an office library to a scientific institution, which engaged in research and documentation of the history of Vienna.

Beginning in the second half of the 19th century, the City Collections encountered a massive enlargement by bequests and legacies by public, artistic and scientific personalities like Franz Grillparzer, Ferdinand Raimund, Johann Nestroy, Karl Kraus, and Helmut Qualtinger. In 1905, the collections of autographs and music have been established as separate units of the department, from 1923 the poster collection and from 1930 the documentation as well were administered separately.

In 1939 the Wiener Stadtbibliothek and the museum were separated into new departments. In 1977, the name Wiener Stadt- und Landesbibliothek was chosen to reflect the constitutional position of Vienna as a city and a state of Austria. In 2001, 340 autographed music manuscripts by Franz Schubert and a nearly complete collection of first editions of his works, part of the music collection, were inscribed on UNESCO's Memory of the World International Register in recognition of their historical significance. In 2006 the name Wienbibliothek im Rathaus replaced the former one.

== Collections ==
The library holds collections of literature (Druckschriftensammlung), autographs (Handschriftensammlung), music (Musiksammlung), posters (Plakatsammlung), and documentation. The library's Schubert collection, which originated from a bequest of the contractor and art sponsor Nicolaus Dumba, has grown systematically over the years and is today "the world's largest collection of Schubertiana".

Important authors have donated their manuscripts to this library. It is as well noteworthy for its collection of historic newspapers published in Vienna. The library holds the art database of the National Fund of the Republic of Austria for Victims of National Socialism.

In detail, the following material is collected:

- Books and brochures
- Newspapers and magazines (appr. 2,000 titles are subscribed today)
- Official publications by the City and State of Vienna, the federal ministries of Austria, the departments of the Municipality of Vienna, laws and ordinances of the Republic of Austria and the States of Vienna and Lower Austria, law of the European Union
- Printed and handwritten compositions, especially by Viennese composers
- Theatre programme leaflets and brochures (historic collection and present collecting)
- Autographs
- Bequests by authors, politicians, artists, scientists and musicians
- Obituaries
- Posters, pamphlets, broadsheets
