= Financial Market Authority (Austria) =

Financial supervisory authority in Austria

- Österreichische Finanzmarktaufsichtsbehörde
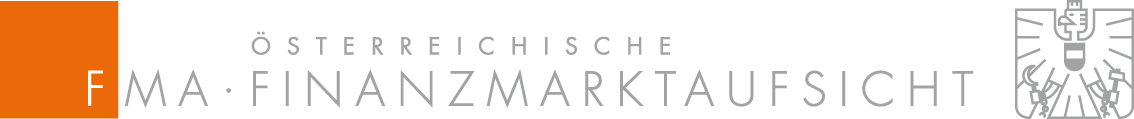

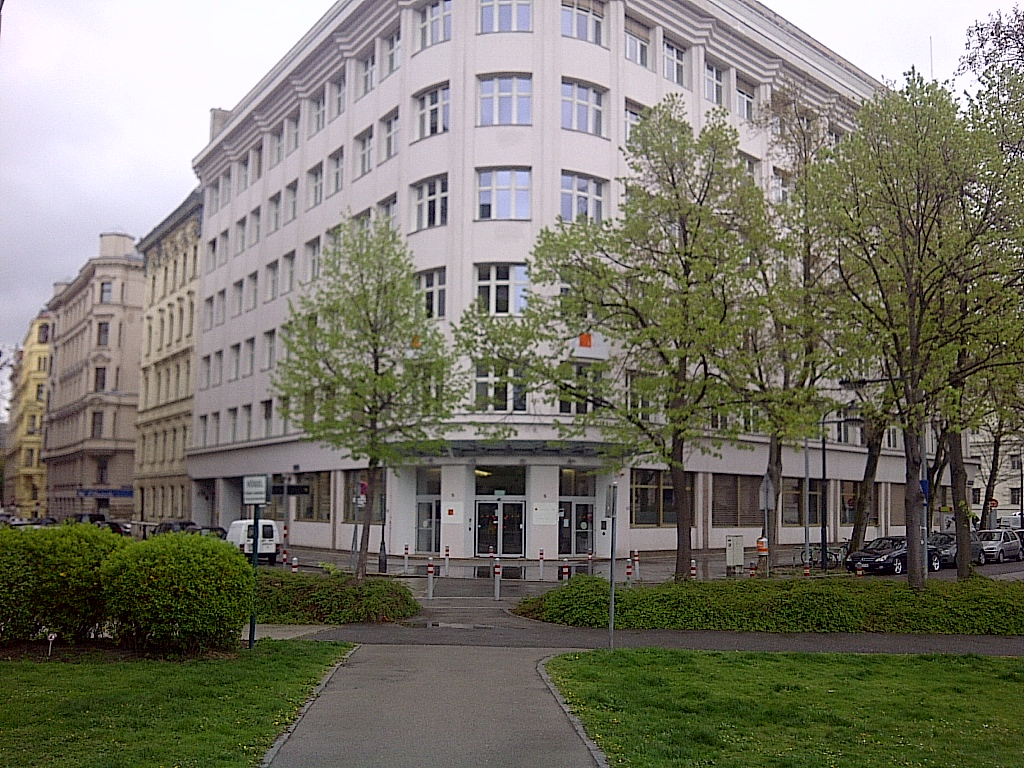

Agency overview
- Formed: January 1, 2002; 24 years ago
- Jurisdiction: Austria
- Headquarters: Vienna, Austria
- Agency executives: Helmut Ettl, Executive Director; Eduard Müller, Executive Director
- Website: www.fma.gv.at

The Austrian Financial Market Authority (German: Österreichische Finanzmarktaufsichtsbehörde, FMA) is Austria's integrated financial supervisory authority. It is responsible for the supervision of credit institutions (complementarily with the ECB Banking Supervision), payment institutions, insurance companies, pension funds, Fund managers, licensed securities service providers, and stock exchanges.

The FMA is an independent authority within the framework of the Financial Market Authority Act (FMABG), and is thus not bound by any political directives in the exercise of its office. However, the Ministry of Finance (Austria) has the right to consent to individual FMA regulations.

Whereas it is governed under a national framework of accountability, the FMA increasingly implements policies set at the European Union level. It is the national competent authority for Austria within European Banking Supervision. It is a voting member of the respective Boards of Supervisors of the European Banking Authority (EBA), European Insurance and Occupational Pensions Authority (EIOPA), and European Securities and Markets Authority (ESMA). It is Austria's designated National Resolution Authority and plenary session member of the Single Resolution Board (SRB). It provides the permanent single common representative for Austria in the Supervisory composition of the General Board of the Anti-Money Laundering Authority (AMLA). It is also a member of the European Systemic Risk Board (ESRB).

== History ==
The origin of the FMA dates back to 1880. At that time, the Assecuranz-Bureau was set up under Emperor Franz Joseph I of Austria due to the steadily increasing distrust of the Ministry of the Interior to supervise the booming insurance industry.

The tasks were defined in the founding acts as follows:

"The state supervision of insurance companies must generally extend to the precise observation of the legal and statutory provisions, as well as to those circumstances which determine the ability of the institution to meet its future obligations at all times. The state supervisory authority therefore has to monitor in particular the correct calculation of the premium reserve, the correct investment of the capital, as well as the correct, complete and as clear as possible presentation of all financial and financial circumstances in the financial statements and statements of account...."

Insurance regulations have become more stringent over the years, but it was not until 1978 that the Federal Act on the Operation and Supervision of Contract Insurance re-regulated supervision.

The entire insurance industry was liberalized by joining the EEA and later the European Union. Accordingly, the supervision was adjusted.

On April 1, 2002, the FMA was created as an integrated regulator for all financial markets and began operations as an independent authority within the framework of the Financial Market Authority Act (FMABG). This law was passed in the summer of 2001 after lengthy political discussions about the establishment of an integrated financial supervision system. The FMA was established as an institution under public law with its own legal personality, and it was entrusted with the supervision of banks, insurance companies, pension funds and the entire securities sector.

== Tasks ==
The tasks of the FMA regarding the supervision of the Austrian financial market are divided into five main areas:

- Supervising banking capital, conduct, and lending (in cooperation with the Oesterreichische Nationalbank)
- Supervising insurance capital, conduct, and products
- Supervising pension funds
- Supervising securities markets
- Supervising payment processing

=== Consumer protection ===
The FMA is not a consumer protection organization in the traditional sense, in that can help complainants in enforcing any claims for damages or claims against a supervised company. As a supervisor, it must maintain objectivity towards all supervised entities and their clients. Damaged consumers must in principle sue for any claims for damages in civil courts.

However, information and complaints from consumers, investors or creditors against market participants are an important source of information for supervisory activities. The FMA investigates every customer complaint and checks whether it is based on systemic errors. The FMA's complaint management and consumer hotline therefore provide information about the legal options and ensure that all information is checked with regard to relevant undesirable developments or possible violations of supervisory standards. Since a complainant does not have party status in an administrative procedure, the FMA does not provide any information on the progress and outcome of the proceedings because of their obligation to maintain privacy. However, if the complainant also sues under civil law, the court can inspect the files by way of administrative assistance.

Complaints about supervised companies can be submitted using a complaint form on the FMA website. Since January 2014, it has also been possible to report abuses or violations of supervisory law in a company that is subject to FMA supervision anonymously via a whistleblower process.

=== International cooperation ===
The FMA is a member of various international bodies, such as the International Association of Insurance Supervisors (IAIS) and International Organization of Securities Commissions (IOSCO).

== Leadership ==
Helmut Ettl has been a member of the FMA Executive Board since 2008 and was last reappointed in 2022. His current term of office runs until February 2028. Eduard Müller was appointed to the FMA Executive Board in 2020. His term of office runs until July 2025. The Ministry of Finance advertised the position in April 2024, but no decision has yet been announced.

== See also ==
- Banking in Austria
- List of financial supervisory authorities by country
