= Raiffeisenlandesbank Niederösterreich-Wien =

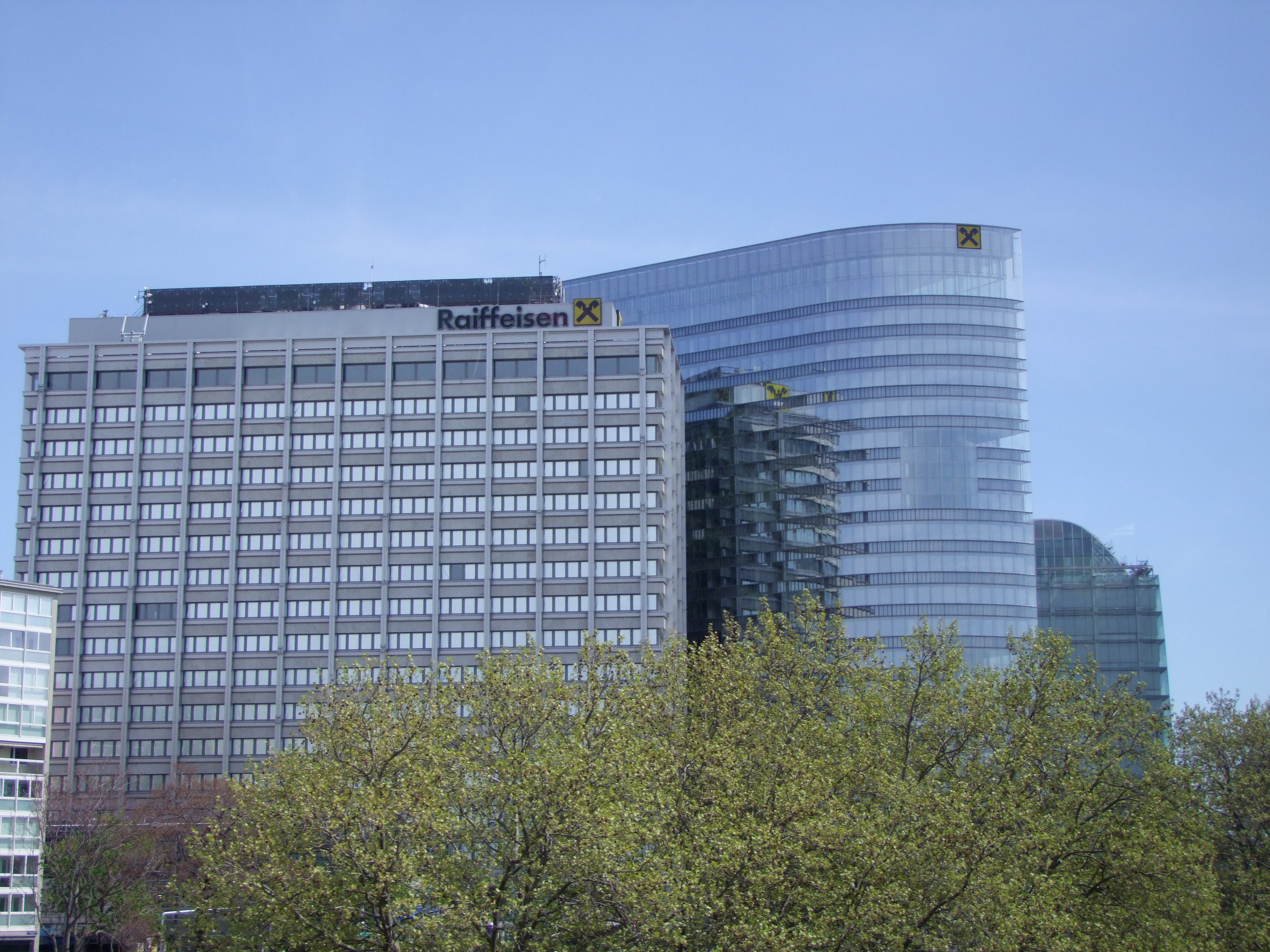
- Company type: Aktiengesellschaft
- Founded: 12 July 2000
- Headquarters: Vienna, Austria
- Total assets: €33.868 billion (2024)
- Number of employees: 957 (2019)
- Parent: Raiffeisen-Holding NÖ-Wien
- Website: www.raiffeisen.at/noew/rlb/de/

Raiffeisenlandesbank Niederösterreich-Wien (English: Raiffeisen State Bank of Lower Austria-Vienna, abbreviated RLB NÖ-Wien) is a group of organized cooperative banks in Vienna and the state of Lower Austria. It is a part of the nationwide Raiffeisen Bankengruppe grouping of independent cooperative banks, and owns a 22.6% stake in Raiffeisen Bank International (RBI). It has around 957 employees and serves around 266,000 private, business and corporate customers.

With a market share of around 42 per cent, they are the leading banking group in Lower Austria.

== Ownership structure ==
RLB NÖ-Wien is owned by Raiffeisen-Holding Niederösterreich-Wien reg.Gen.m.b.H. (79.1 %) and the Raiffeisen banks of Lower Austria.

== Principal shareholdings ==
- Raiffeisen Bank International AG (RBI)
- Raiffeisen Informatik GmbH (R-IT)
- Raiffeisen Immobilien Vermittlung GmbH

== See also ==
- List of banks in Austria
- List of banks in the euro area
