= Raiffeisen Zentralbank =

Austrian bank

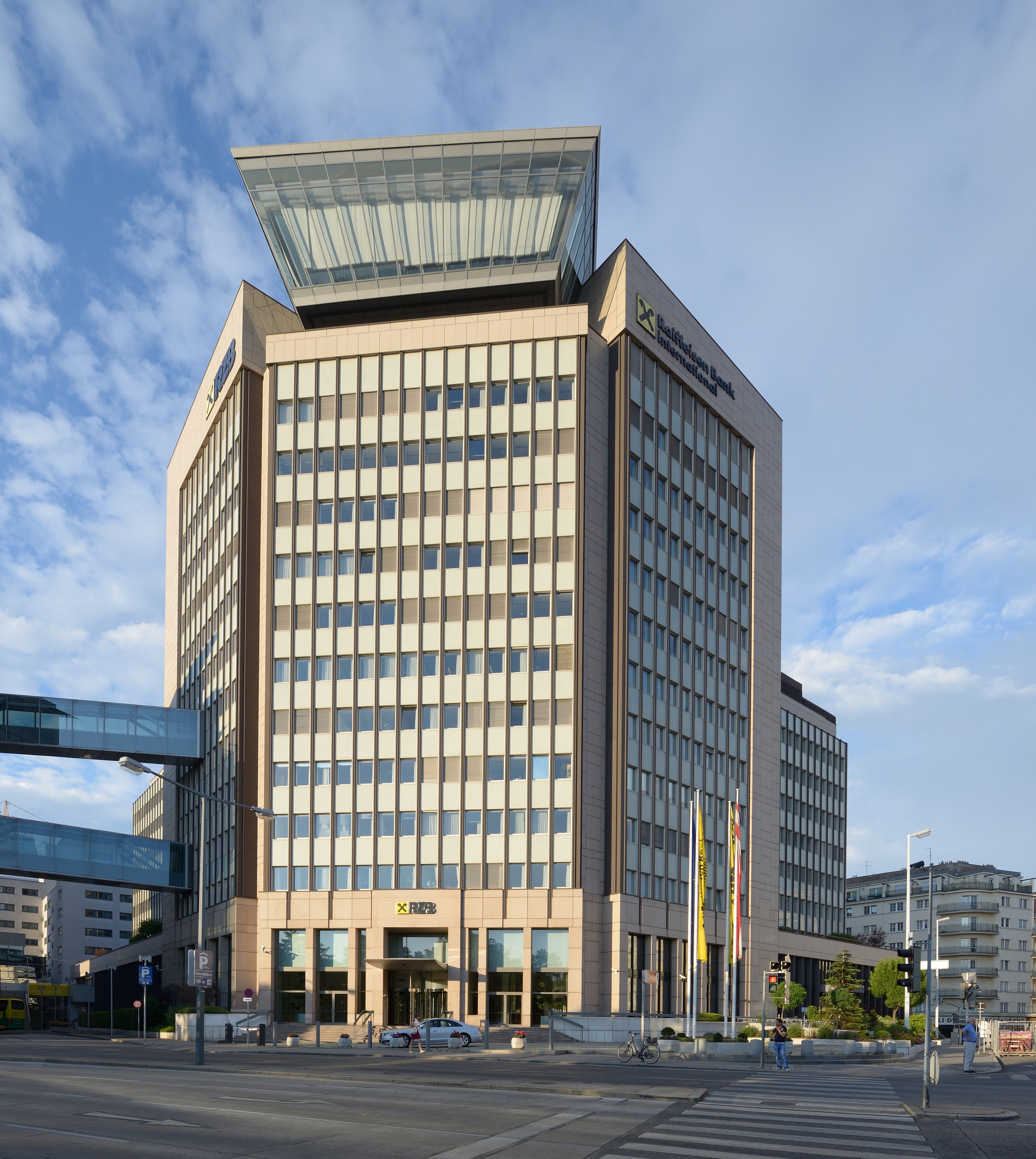
- Native name: Raiffeisen Zentralbank Österreich AG
- Type: joint venture of cooperatives
- Industry: Finance and Insurance
- Founded: 16 August 1927
- Defunct: 18 March 2017
- Fate: reverse merger with Raiffeisen Bank International
- Headquarters: Vienna, Austria
- Services: Commercial banking, investment banking, private banking, asset management
- Net income: ▲€236.864 million (2015)
- Total assets: ▼€138.426 billion (2015)
- Total equity: ▲€5.388 billion (2015)
- Owner: regional Raiffeisenlandesbanks (82.4%)
- Number of employees: ca. 55,400 (?)
- Subsidiaries: Raiffeisen Bank International (60.7%)
- Website: www.rzb.at
- Footnotes in consolidated basis

Raiffeisen Zentralbank Österreich A.G. (RZB) was a significant bank in Austria and the central institution of the Raiffeisen Banking Group (RBG) until its merger into its subsidiary Raiffeisen Bank International (RBI) in 2017.

It had subsidiaries held via RBI in, amongst others: Ukraine, Hungary, Czech Republic, Romania, Kosovo, Albania, Bulgaria, Serbia, Bosnia-Herzegovina, Croatia, and Switzerland. The largest of these subsidiaries by far was Raiffeisenbank (Russia) which accounted for 74 percent of the company's pretax profit.

== History ==
The incorporation meeting of the shareholders of the Austrian Raiffeisen cooperative was held on 16 August 1927. With this, a central institution was established for the Raiffeisen Banking Group, and since then this institution has functioned as the national and international representative and coordinator for the Group. The founding took place roughly four decades after the establishment of the first Austrian savings and loan cooperative to use the system devised by Friedrich Wilhelm Raiffeisen.

The original company name was Girozentrale der österreichischen Genossenschaften. In 1939, after the German annexation of Austria, the new German owners changed the name to Genossenschaftliche Zentralbank der Ostmark Aktiengesellschaft, and then in 1942 to Genossenschaftliche Zentralbank Wien Aktiengesellschaft. From 1953 on, the new name was Genossenschaftliche Zentralbank Aktiengesellschaft, with the abbreviation GZB also being used for the company. Since 1989, the bank has been named Raiffeisen Zentralbank Österreich Aktiengesellschaft, abbreviated as RZB.

Founded primarily as a liquidity equalisation office for the Raiffeisen Banking Group, the company in its first ten years of operation significantly expanded its business activities through the 1930s to include fields such as foreign exchange and currency transactions, lending, acceptance of deposits and investment in securities. Along with this, the bank's staff also increased significantly, rising to 85 employees at the end of its first decade of existence.

In 1938, one day after the German occupation of Austria, the bank was taken over by a provisional German administrator and subsequently nationalised. The bank was not returned to its pre-war owners until 1955.

In the 1950s, GZB began to expand and transform its foreign operations. This was also clearly reflected in the bank's growth, with the number of staff rising to almost 200 by 1957. By the end of the 1950s, the bank began to found specialised companies or to invest in them. Working with the co-operatives also allowed the institution to offer each and every Raiffeisen bank and its customers a universal range of financial services. The product portfolio of the Raiffeisen Banking Group was further expanded with the founding of Raiffeisen Building Society, Raiffeisen Insurance, Raiffeisen Leasing and other specialised companies.

Along with its position as one of the largest commercial and investment banks in Austria, RZB started developing another main area of business already in the 1980s, founding the present-day Raiffeisen Bank in Budapest in 1986. This early strategic decision to expand into Central and Eastern Europe (CEE) proved to be one of the most important decisions in RZB's history. Starting from 1989, with the collapse of the communist regimes, RZB focused intensely on CEE, initially founding numerous banks to build up a viable network, which was complemented with acquisitions starting from 2000.

Along with Austria, RZB considers CEE to be its home market. The subsidiary bank Raiffeisen Bank International was formed, merging Raiffeisen International Bankholding AG and the corporate banking business and related subsidiaries from RZB. RZB currently holds a stake of approximately 78.5% (with the rest of the shares in free float) and operates one of the largest banking networks in CEE.

In 2005, RZB bought Ukrainian Bank Aval, and renamed its subsidiary Raiffeisen Bank Aval.

In 2007, Raiffeisen made €1.48 billion, 79% of it from operations abroad.

After the international financial problems of 2008, Raiffeisenbank Chairman Herbert Stepic served as spokesman for a group of 10 central and eastern European banks, which asked the European Central Bank (ECB) to extend their bailout.

In June 2013, Raiffeisen supported the nationalised Volksbank Group by purchasing a package of poor loans worth $300mn from them.

In February 2014, Raiffeisen Bank International was reported as reevaluating their participation in the Eastern European and Russian markets, where 57% of Raiffeisen's total assets were, according to bank data. Roughly half of the loans made by Raiffeisen and its subsidiaries in Ukraine were in U.S. dollars, while many loans in Hungary were in Swiss francs. As local currencies tumbled, those loans became more expensive for borrowers to pay off. The bank asked the Austrian taxpayer to buy preferred shares of Raiffeisen valued at €1.75 billion in a capital-raising measure. The coupons would pay 9.3% annual interest and must be repaid within five years, said an Austrian Finance Ministry spokesman.

In 2015 the Raiffeisen Bank made a profit again (379 million euros / $420 million). The bank postponed the sale announced in 2014 of its Polish subsidiary, Raiffeisen Bank Polska SA. Another factor that affected the bank's decision to wait with the sale were the elaborate demands by Polish regulators for bank sales. In response to Poland's new bank levy, Raiffeisen Bank announced that "in principle, we still want to sell the bank, but not under all circumstances and at any price, and we can’t rule out that we won’t sell it in the coming months and years."

In 2016 the parent company Raiffeisen-Landesbanken-Holding GmbH was merged with Raiffeisen Zentralbank; the latter was the surviving entity. On 18 March 2017 Raiffeisen Zentralbank merged with subsidiary Raiffeisen Bank International; the latter was the surviving entity.

== Shareholders ==
Before 2016, RZB was 90.43% owned by Raiffeisen‐Landesbanken‐Holding GmbH, which in turn is owned by the nine Austrian Raiffeisen regional banks (eight regional centres and Zveza Bank). Other RZB owners included:

- UBG-Bankenbeteiligungs G.m.b.H. (4.64%),
- Uniqa Insurance Group (2.47%)
- the warehousing group RWA Raiffeisen Ware Austria (2.40%),
- Raiffeisen Versicherung AG (0.06%)

In 2016 Raiffeisen‐Landesbanken‐Holding GmbH merged with Raiffeisen Zentralbank.

== Subsidiaries ==
The subsidiaries of RZB, other than RBI, included:

- Valida Holding AG
- Raiffeisen Bausparkasse
- Raiffeisen Capital Management
  - Raiffeisen Kapitalanlagegesellschaft
  - Raiffeisen Vermögensverwaltungsbank AG
  - Raiffeisen International Fund Advisory
  - Raiffeisen Immobilien Kapitalanlage GmbH
- Raiffeisen Centrobank
- Raiffeisen Datennetz Gesellschaft m.b.H.
- Raiffeisen evolution project development GmbH
- Raiffeisen Factor Bank AG
- Raiffeisen Informatik GmbH
- Raiffeisen Investment AG (RIAG)
- Raiffeisen-Leasing
- Raiffeisen Versicherung (100%-Tochterunternehmen der UNIQA Versicherungen AG)
- Raiffeisen Wohnbau Bank
- RSC Raiffeisen Service Center GmbH
- Raiffeisen Software GmbH

Raiffeisen Zentralbank, the Raiffeisen regional banks and Raiffeisen-Holding Niederösterreich-Wien have numerous investments in companies in various fields of business: The most well known of these are:

- Uniqa Insurance Group
- Agrana,
- Strabag,
- Mediaprint (Kurier),
- Salinen Österreich,
- Landeshypothekenbanken for Oberösterreich, Salzburg and Steiermark,
- Do & Co,
- Demel
- Österreichische Lotterien

Additional companies in which RZB holds a stake include:

- Kathrein & Co. Privatgeschäftsbank AG
- Notartreuhandbank AG
- ZHS Office- & Facilitymanagement GmbH

== Controversy ==
=== Holocaust ===
Theft of Jewish Property

Raiffeisen Zentralbank had charges brought against them by (plaintiffs) present and former nationals of Austria, and their heirs and successors, who sought compensation for the theft of their property during the Nazi Era and the Second World War.

Jewish organizations requested that Austria gets more engaged in the property side of the Holocaust equation.

Movement Against Jewish Business owners

At the time, founder Raiffeisen claimed that the Jews practice usury, cheat, and are dishonest and that they control the livestock market and the money market.

Once Jews were pushed out of the livestock trade this enabled the "Raiffeisen movement" of rural cooperatives to flourish.

=== Mafia ===
A number of investigators have suggested that Raiffeisen Zentralbank is involved in laundering money for the Russian mafia.

When Moldovan journalist Natalia Morar investigated money flows involving Raiffeisen Zentralbank, she said she received a death threat from the FSB and she was banned from Russia.

A Gazprom spokesman has said that Raiffeisen Investment AG is a Gazprom partner in RosUkrEnergo, an opaque Ukrainian company. On 6 August 2004, Interfax reported "100 percent subsidiaries of Russia's Gazprombank and Austria's Raiffeisen Bank created the RosUkrEnergoprom company for the supply of Turkmen gas to the Ukrainian market. The company, shared by the parties 50-50, will be registered in Switzerland. However, Raiffeisen Investment has said that it only manages RosUkrEnergo for unknown "Ukrainian businessmen".

According to documents uncovered during the United States diplomatic cables leak, US diplomats suspected Raiffeisen Investment was "a front to provide legitimacy to the gas company that we suspect the U.S.-indicted Russian crime boss Semyon Mogilevich controls".

One of the cases involved the Russian bank called "Diskont". To illustrate the scale of money laundering, $1.6 billion was transferred from Diskont Bank's accounts to Raiffeisen on August 29, 2006. According to the New York Times, Diskont received a 10% commission from the money transfers. In September 2006, the deputy chairman of the Central bank of Russia, Andrey Kozlov, revoked Diskont's license. Just days later Kozlov was murdered.

The bank has been also suspected of laundering money for the Italian mafia.

=== Troika laundromat ===
Troika laundromat or ŪkioLeaks is a money laundering scheme organized by Russia's former largest investment bank – Troika Dialog. This scheme allowed the flow of some $4.8 billion of funds from Russian companies and figures into Europe and the US between 2003 and early 2013. It was noted that Raiffeisen have neglected AML obligations during handling the Troika's money.

== See also ==
- Banking in Austria
- List of banks in Austria
