= Banking in Austria =

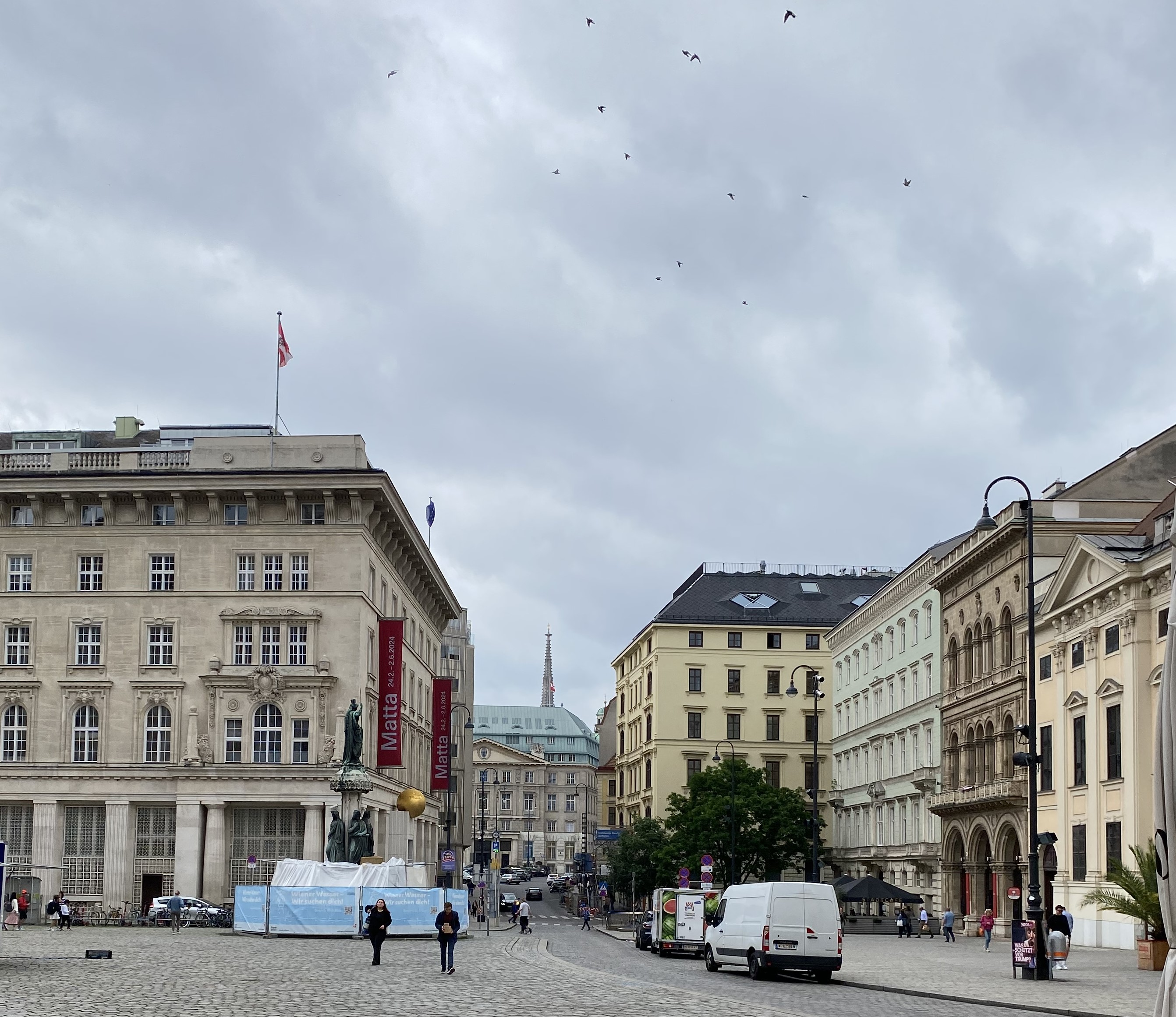
View of the Freyung towards Am Hof in Vienna, with, from left to right, the former head offices of Creditanstalt, Niederösterreichische Escompte-Gesellschaft (later Länderbank, in the background), Anglo-Austrian Bank, and Austro-Hungarian Bank

The banking system in Austria plays a pivotal role in the country's economy, ensuring financial stability and providing essential services to both individuals and businesses. The Austrian banking system is characterized by a three-tier structure, consisting of joint-stock banks, savings banks (Sparkassen), and cooperative banks (Raiffeisenbanken and Volksbanken).

The central bank, Oesterreichische Nationalbank (OeNB), is responsible for the country's monetary policy and the supervision of the banking sector. The Financial Market Authority (FMA) is the primary regulatory body for the Austrian financial market, including banks, insurance companies, and other financial institutions.

== Banking system ==
=== Regulations ===
Since the introduction of the Kreditwesensgesetz (KWG) in 1979, the boundaries between the various types of credit institutions have gradually become blurred. Many banks have developed into universal banks offering a comprehensive range of banking services. Prior to the 1979 KWG, the Austrian banking system was still governed by the Kreditwesengesetz, which had been in force since October 1, 1938 in Nazi Germany and the associated Austria. The 1979 KWG was created as a result of the increasing liberalization of the banking system and the general trend towards universal banks. The rapid growth and increased activity of Austrian banks abroad made it necessary to adapt to international standards, which was regulated in the 1986 amendment to the law. On January 1, 1994, the KWG was replaced by the new Banking Act (Bankwesensgesetz- BWG), which was drafted in view of EU conformity and also contains improved provisions for creditor and consumer protection. In 2002, the Austrian Financial Market Authority (FMA) was founded, which supervises the Austrian banking sector. Due to the economic interest in a stable financial sector, financial market participants, the financial market infrastructure (stock exchange, securities depository) and securities trading are subject to state supervision.

=== Oesterreichische Nationalbank and Oesterreichische Kontrollbank ===
The central bank of Austria, Oesterreichische Nationalbank (OeNB), is responsible for the country's monetary policy, the issuance of banknotes, and the supervision of the banking sector. Established in 1816, the OeNB operates as an independent institution within the framework of the European System of Central Banks (ESCB) and the Eurosystem, both of which were established in 1998.

The OeNB's primary objective is to maintain price stability and contribute to the stability of the Austrian financial system. In addition to its monetary policy function, the OeNB is also responsible for ensuring the smooth functioning of payment systems, managing foreign exchange reserves, and compiling financial statistics.

Great importance is attached in Austria to the Oesterreichische Kontrollbank (OeKB). It is Austria's central financial and information service provider for the export industry and the capital market. Its services are available to companies and financial institutions as well as institutions of the Republic of Austria. The services of OeKB include Export Services, Capital Market Services for stock exchanges, issuers, financial service providers and investors as well as Energy Market Services for the electricity and gas market. Furthermore, OeKB is a sought-after issuer on the international bond market.

=== Financial Market Authority ===
The Financial Market Authority (FMA) is the primary regulatory body for the Austrian financial market, responsible for supervising banks, insurance companies, pension funds, and other financial institutions. Established in 2002, the FMA aims to ensure the stability, transparency, and integrity of the Austrian financial market. The FMA operates as an independent, integrated authority, working closely with the OeNB to maintain a stable and reliable financial system.

=== Largest banks in Austria ===
The largest Austrian credit institutions by balance sheet total in 2018

Ranking 2018	Bank	Balance sum (Billions)
1	Erste Group Bank AG	236,79
2	Raiffeisen Bank International AG - RBI	140,12
3	UniCredit Bank Austria AG	99,03
4	BAWAG Group AG	44,70
5	Raiffeisenlandesbank Oberösterreich AG	41,99
6	Raiffeisenlandesbank Niederösterreich-Wien AG	26,97
7	Oberbank AG	22,21
8	Steiermärkische Bank und Sparkassen AG	15,77
9	Raiffeisen-Landesbank Steiermark	15,12
10	Hypo NOE Landesbank für Niederösterreich und Wien AG	14,06

=== Notable bankers in Austria ===
The following former and current bankers have made an important contribution to the development of the Austrian banking industry and continue to develop it in their position as CEO:

- Gerhard Randa: long-standing CEO Unicredit Bank Austria; CEO of Sberbank Europe AG
- Andreas Mitterlehner: General Director of Hypo Landesbank Upper Austria for 16 years
- Peter Bosek long-standing Chairman of the Management Board of Erste Bank and Member of the Management Board of Erste Bank Groupe
- Helmut Hardt: long-standing member of the Management Board and also CEO of Wiener Privatbank SE
- Ludwig Scharinger: he was from 1985 to 2012 General Director and Chairman of the Board of Raiffeisenlandesbank Oberösterreich
- Alfred Reiter: Member of the Management Board of Investkredit Bank AG from 1976-2001, also their Chairman and for the last 7 years also active as General Manager.
- Erwin Hameseder: former chairmen of the Board and General Manager of RLB NÖ-Wien. Since 2012 Chairman of Raiffeisen-Holding NÖ-Wien
- Andreas Treichl: long-term CEO of Erste Bank, 2008 to 2020 CEO of Erste Group Bank AG
- Robert Ulm: CEO of Hello bank!, more than 20 years of experience in the Austrian financial industry and online brokerage.
- Robert Zadrazil: CEO of Bank-Austria since 2016 and President of the Association of Austrian Banks and Bankers.
- Gerda Holzinger-Burgstaller: will be the new CEO of Erste Bank Austria in 2021, also acting as CFO and COO
- Heinrich Schaller: Chairman of the Board of Raiffeisenlandesbank Oberösterreich AG and General Director of RLB
- Igor Strehl: long-standing CEO of VTB Bank (Austria) AG (former Donau Bank AG) and a board member of Sberbank Europe AG (former Volksbank International AG)
- Erich Hampel
- Anas Abuzaakouk: CEO for BAWAG Group AG and Chairman-Management Board & CEO for BAWAG P.S.K. AG (a subsidiary of BAWAG Group AG). He is also on the board of easybank AG.

=== Neobank in Austria ===
The neobank industry in Austria is an emerging sector in the country's financial landscape, as digital banking services continue to gain traction among consumers seeking convenience, simplicity, and innovation. Neobanks are digital-first banks that offer a range of financial services, such as personal accounts, loans, and payment services, primarily through mobile and web applications, with little or no reliance on physical branches.

Key Players in the Austrian Neobank Industry:

1. N26: A prominent German neobank, N26 has expanded its operations to Austria
2. Bank99: A subsidiary of the Austrian Post, Bank99 is a digital bank targeting both consumers and businesses, offering services such as current accounts, loans, and investment products. Bank99 combines the digital-first approach of neobanks with access to physical branches in post offices across Austria.

== Stock exchange ==
A special decree of Empress Maria Theresa (August 1, 1771) provided for the establishment of a stock exchange in Vienna. From the mid-19th century to the beginning of World War I, it was the main capital market of middle and eastern Europe, and from 1918 to 1938, it had continuous international importance as an equity market for the newly founded nations originating from the former monarchy. The exchange also deals in five Austrian and seven foreign investment certificates. The Austrian Traded Index has grown steadily in the past few years, growing 8.71% in 2002, and averaging a growth rate of 10.15% in the past five years. Market capitalization as of December 2004 stood at $85.815 billion, with the index up 57.4% at 2,431.4 from the previous year. There were 99 companies listed on the Wiener Börse AG in 2004.

== See also ==
- List of banks in Austria
