= National Fund of the Republic of Austria for Victims of National Socialism =

Fund for victims of Nazism

The National Fund of the Republic of Austria for Victims of National Socialism (German: Nationalfonds der Republik Österreich für Opfer des Nationalsozialismus) is a fund created by the Republic of Austria to seek to apply restitution for property confiscated by the Nazis during World War II. The fund was established in 1995.

The fund maintains databases of property, including the Art Database of the National Fund, held in the Wiener Stadtbibliothek.

== General Settlement Fund ==
The General Settlement Fund is constituted to seek to compensate victims of Nazi persecution from all of the persecuted minorities – religious, cultural, ethnic, and handicapped – and those who left Austria in order to escape persecution. The claim for compensation passes to the heirs of the original victims on their death.

Applications to the General Settlement Fund closed in May 2003.

On 26 April 2022, the Board of Trustees determined that the General Settlement Fund had "completely fulfilled its tasks" and was dissolved.

== National Fund ==
The National Fund is different from the General Fund in that it has different eligibility criteria and there is, in January 2009, no deadline for filing applications.

== Bibliography ==
- Renate S. Meissner on behalf of the Nationalfonds der Republik Österreich für Opfer des Nationalsozialismus (ed). Erinnerungen. Lebensgeschichten von Opfern des Nationalsozialismus. 4 voll., Vienna 2010–2015.
