= ATOS Bank =

Commercial bank in Bosnia and Herzegovina

ATOS BANK
- Trade name: ATOS BANK a.d. Banja Luka
- Company type: Private company (a.d. - akcionarsko društvo)
- Traded as: ZPKB-R-A
- Industry: Financial services
- Predecessor: Zepter komerc banka a.d. Banja Luka; Volksbank a.d. Banja Luka; Sberbank a.d. Banja Luka
- Founded: March 1, 1999 as Zepter komerc banka a.d. Banja Luka; October 1, 2007 as Volksbank a.d. Banja Luka; December 31, 2012 as Sberbank a.d. Banja Luka; May 23, 2022 as ATOS BANK a.d. Banja Luka
- Headquarters: Banja Luka, Jevrejska 71, 78000, Bosnia and Herzegovina
- Number of locations: 27 branches (2024)
- Area served: Bosnia and Herzegovina
- Parent: ATOS BANK a.d. Banja Luka, BiH
- Website: www.atosbank.ba

ATOS Bank a.d. Banja Luka is a commercial bank in Bosnia and Herzegovina. It is headquartered in Banja Luka with stakes (ZPKB-R-A) listed on the Banja Luka Stock Exchange.

ATOS Bank (SWIFT code: SABRBA2B on the address "Jevrejska 71, Banja Luka", started operating under current name on 23 May 2022 when Bosnian Nova Banka bought ex Russian Sberbank a.d. Banja Luka which operated only on the market in RS entity.

In the Bosnian market, the bank operates as a private company with 27 branches, is a member of Deposit Insurance Agency of Bosnia and Herzegovina (AOD) and it is supervised by ABRS banking regulator based on CB BiH regulations.

In March 2024, ATOS Bank and Nova Banka joined the ATM networks and thereby enabled their users to withdraw cash with debit cards free of charge via creating the second ATM network in the Bosnian market after BH mreža bankomata - operated by BAMCARD.

== History ==
=== Zepter komerc banka a.d. Banja Luka ===
On 1 March 1999, Zepter komerc banka a.d. Banja Luka was founded in Banja Luka.

=== Volksbank a.d. Banja Luka ===
In July 2007, Austrian banking group Volksbank International paid KM 82.1 million BAM for the purchase of the shares of Zepter Komerc Banka from Banja Luka and officially became its owner.

Bank continued to operate within the international Volksbank group under the new name Volksbank a.d. Banja Luka (with sister company Volksbank BH d.d. Sarajevo).

In 2012, Sberbank Europe Group from Russia completed its acquisition of 100 percent of Volksbank International AG (VBI), the umbrella institution that owned Volksbank d.d. BH in Sarajevo and Volksbank a.d. in Banja Luka.

=== Sberbank a.d. Banja Luka ===
At the beginning of 2013, Volksbank banks in Bosnia and Herzegovina were given the new name "Sberbank" - so former Austrian banks became Russian-owned banks in BiH and received new corporate names:

- Sberbank a.d. Banja Luka - operated until 2022 (purchased by Nova Banka; now operates as ATOS BANK) and
- Sberbank BH d.d. Sarajevo, which also operated until 2022 (it was bought by the Bosnian ASA Banka).

When Russia's largest lender Sberbank announced on February 2, 2022 that it was exiting almost all European markets, blaming a large outflow of cash and threats to its staff and assets following Russia's invasion of Ukraine and international sanctions that followed, according to media reports, it was stated that the operation of Sberbank a.d. Banja Luka was also threatened due War in Ukraine.

Banking Agency of Republika Srpska (ABRS) on 2 March 2022 has announced that the purchase of Sberbank a.d. Banja Luka in RS has been completed by local Nova Banka, owned by the company MG Mind from Mrkonjić Grad, and current name ATOS BANK was presented on 23 May 2022.

== See also ==
- List of banks in Bosnia and Herzegovina
- Central Bank of Bosnia and Herzegovina
- Union Banka
- Komercijalno-Investiciona Banka
- Banka Poštanska štedionica Banja Luka
- Nova Banka
