= Naša Banka =

Commercial bank in Bosnia and Herzegovina

- Trade name: Naša Banka a.d. Banja Luka
- Company type: Private company (a.d. - akcionarsko društvo)
- Traded as: BLSE PIBB-O-A
- Industry: Financial services
- Predecessor: Naša Banka a.d. Bijeljina
- Founded: 1974 as Privredna banka Sarajevo - Filijala Bijeljina; 1992 as Semberska banka a.d. Bijeljina; 1992 as Pavlović Internacional banka a.d. Slobomir, Bijeljina; November 2019 as Naša Banka a.d. Bijeljina; November 2023 as Naša Banka a.d. Banja Luka
- Headquarters: Banja Luka, Ivana Franje Jukića 1, 78000, Bosnia and Herzegovina
- Number of locations: 31 branches (2024)
- Area served: Bosnia and Herzegovina
- Key people: Radoljub Golubović (Chairman of the Supervisory Board); Dejan Vuklišević, (President of the Management Board)
- Parent: Galens Invest Finance d.o.o Zvornik, BiH
- Website: www.nasa-banka.com

Naša Banka a.d. Banja Luka is a commercial bank in Bosnia and Herzegovina.

It is headquartered in Banja Luka with stakes (PIBB-O-A) listed on the Banja Luka Stock Exchange, owned by Galens Invest Finance d.o.o Zvornik.

Naša Banka (SWIFT code: PAVLBA22XXX on the address "Ivana Franje Jukića 1, Banja Luka ", started operating under current name in 2023 mainly in RS entity.

On Bosnian market, Naša Banka Banja Luka operate as private company, is a member of Deposit Insurance Agency of Bosnia and Herzegovina (AOD) and it is supervised by ABRS banking regulator based on CB BiH regulations.

Customers of Naša Banka can use debit and credit cards via national payment clearing provider and processing center BAMCARD, with m-banking and e-banking services for their current accounts and deposits via 31 branches (2024) in BiH towns.

== History ==
In SR Bosnia and Herzegovina, as the parent bank, Privredna banka Sarajevo made a system of local banks and branches mainly in the larger BiH cities.

For Bijeljina, predecessor of Naša Banka was Privredna banka Sarajevo - Filijala Bijeljina founded in 1974.

In 1992, after Bosnia and Herzegovina independence referendum, PBS from Sarajevo was forced to stop operations due to the war in Bosnia, so the local authorities founded a new bank Semberska banka a.d. Bijeljina.

Later, bank was privatised by a Bosnian Serb businessman Slobodan Pavlović and renamed to Pavlović Internacional Banka a.d. Bijeljina from Slobomir.

== Pavlović International Banka ==
After the collapse and closure of Bobar banka and Banka Srpske, according to media reports, it was stated that the operation of Pavlović International Banka was also threatened.

Bosnian Serb leader Milorad Dodik in 2022 repeated his denial of allegations that he received a fictitious loan from a friendly bank to buy a pricey villa, after being grilled by Prosecutor's Office of BiH. The case dates back to 2016, when it was alleged that the "Pavlović International Banka" had extended to Dodik a fake mortgage to enable the property purchase, in order to hide the real origin of the money.

== See also ==
- List of banks in Bosnia and Herzegovina
- Central Bank of Bosnia and Herzegovina
- Union Banka
- Komercijalno-Investiciona Banka
- Banka Poštanska štedionica Banja Luka
- Nova Banka
