= MF banka =

Commercial bank in Bosnia and Herzegovina

- Trade name: MF banka a.d. Banja Luka
- Company type: Private company (a.d. - akcionarsko društvo)
- Traded as: BLSE:IEFB-R-A
- Industry: Financial services
- Founded: 2010; 16 years ago
- Headquarters: Banja Luka, Bosnia and Herzegovina
- Number of locations: 36 branches (2024)
- Area served: Bosnia and Herzegovina
- Key people: Sandra Lonco (Chairman of the Supervisory Board); Aleksandar Kremenović, (President of the Management Board)
- Products: Banking services, microfinance
- Parent: MF Grupa d.o.o. (94,87%); GLS investicioni fond (5,13%)
- Website: mfbanka.com

MF banka a.d. Banja Luka is a commercial bank in Bosnia and Herzegovina. The bank has its headquarters in Banja Luka with shares listed on the Banja Luka Stock Exchange.

The bank is owned by MF Grupa d.o.o. (94,87%) and GLS investicioni fond (5,13%)

== History ==
The bank formally began operations in 2010 in Republika Srpska, although some business databases trace its corporate origins back to 2007 when the banking entity was first incorporated.

The bank was created out of the broader Mikrofin financial group. Mikrofin had already become one of the largest microcredit organizations in Bosnia after the post-war rebuilding period of the late 1990s and 2000s. MF banka was established so the group could expand from microfinance into full commercial banking services, including deposits, payment services, cards, and broader SME lending.

A significant milestone came in 2015 when Dutch development bank FMO and German development bank KfW acquired minority equity stakes in the bank. Their investment was intended to strengthen the bank’s capital base, governance standards, and SME lending capacity.

== Operations ==
MF banka (SWIFT code: MFBLBA22XXX) operates from the address "Aleja Svetog Save 61".

MF banka is a member of Deposit Insurance Agency of Bosnia and Herzegovina (AOD) and it is supervised by Banking Agency of Republika Srpska (ABRS) banking regulator based on Central Bank of Bosnia and Herzegovina regulations.

On the Bosnian market, the bank operate as partner company of microcredit organization that operates as a different company (Mikrofin and Mikrofin osiguranje - insurance).

In addition to services intended for companies, retail customers can use (Visa) debit and credit cards via national payment clearing provider and processing center BAMCARD, with m-banking and e-banking services for their current accounts and deposits via 36 branches (2024) in BiH towns.

== See also ==
- List of banks in Bosnia and Herzegovina
- Central Bank of Bosnia and Herzegovina
- Nova Banka
- Komercijalno-Investiciona Banka
- Banka Poštanska štedionica Banja Luka
- Union Banka
