= Intesa Sanpaolo banka Bosna i Hercegovina =

Commercial bank in Bosnia and Herzegovina

- Trade name: Intesa Sanpaolo banka BiH
- Type: Private company (d.d. - dioničko društvo)
- Traded as: Sarajevo Stock Exchange: UPIBP
- Industry: Financial services
- Predecessors: UPI banka and LT Gospodarska banka
- Founded: 1972 as UPI banka Sarajevo; 1990 as UPI banka d.d. Sarajevo; 14 January 2008; 18 years ago as Intesa Sanpaolo banka BiH
- Headquarters: Sarajevo, Bosnia and Herzegovina
- Number of locations: 48 branches (2024)
- Area served: Bosnia and Herzegovina
- Products: Banking services, mortgages
- Parent: Intesa Sanpaolo
- Website: intesasanpaolobanka.ba

Intesa Sanpaolo banka Bosna i Hercegovina or simply Intesa Sanpaolo banka is a commercial bank in Bosnia and Herzegovina.

It is headquartered in Sarajevo, with majority private-owned capital owned by the Italian Intesa Sanpaolo Group.

== History ==
The bank traces its origins back to 1972, when it was established in Sarajevo as UPI Banka, originally serving the agricultural and food industries in socialist-era Bosnia and Herzegovina.

After the breakup of Yugoslavia and the transition to a market economy, the bank was reorganized as UPI banka d.d. Sarajevo in 1990. In 2000, it became fully privately owned through a share issuance process.

In February 2006, Italian banking group Intesa acquired a controlling stake through its international subsidiary. At the time, Intesa was expanding aggressively across Central and Eastern Europe.

In 2007, UPI Banka merged with LT Gospodarska Banka d.d. Sarajevo, another Bosnian bank partly connected to Croatia’s Privredna Banka Zagreb (PBZ). Following the merger, the combined institution became one of the larger banks in Bosnia and Herzegovina.

Its parent group Intesa Sanpaolo, was created on 1 January 2007 through the merger of Banca Intesa and Sanpaolo IMI in Italy.

On 20 August 2008, the Bosnian bank formally changed its name to Intesa Sanpaolo Banka d.d. Bosna i Hercegovina.

== Operations ==
The companies shares are listed on the Sarajevo Stock Exchange, Intesa Sanpaolo banka BiH (SWIFT code: UPBKBA22XXX) on the address "Obala Kulina Bana 9A, 71000 Sarajevo", started operating under current name on 14 January 2008.

The bank is a member of Deposit Insurance Agency of Bosnia and Herzegovina (AOD) and it is supervised by FBA banking regulator based on CB BiH regulations.

Customers can use debit and credit cards via national payment clearing provider and processing center BAMCARD, in BiH towns. with m-banking and e-banking services for their current accounts and deposits via 48 branches (2024) They can can also use Western union services while the bank offers consumer loans, housing loans, auto loans, business loans.

== See also ==
- List of banks in Bosnia and Herzegovina
- Central Bank of Bosnia and Herzegovina
- Intesa Sanpaolo
- Privredna banka Zagreb
- Privredna banka Sarajevo
- Banca Intesa Beograd
