= Sberbank Europe Group =

Bank headquartered in Vienna, Austria

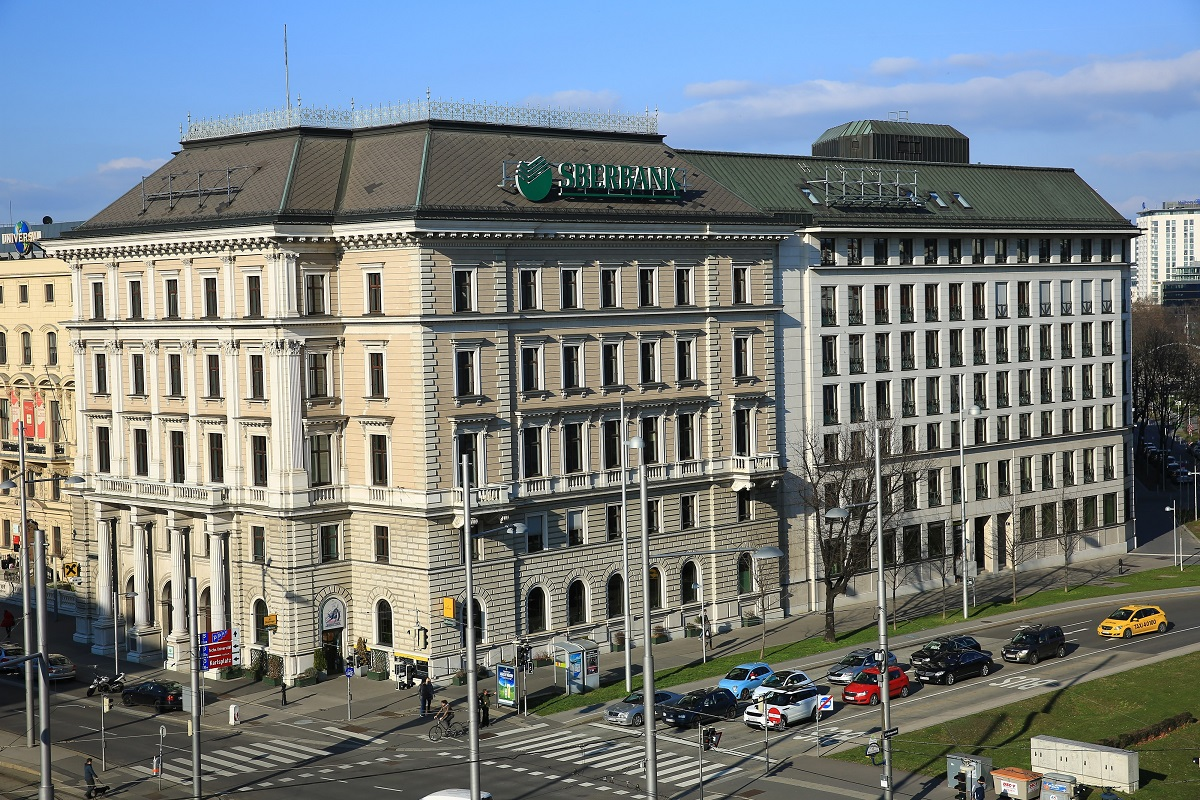
- Type: Aktiengesellschaft
- Industry: Banking, financial services
- Founded: 2012 (acquisition of Volksbank International AG)
- Defunct: March 2022 (insolvency proceedings in Austria; resolution in Croatia and Slovenia)
- Headquarters: Vienna, Austria
- Area served: Central and Eastern Europe
- Key people: Sonja Sarközi (CEO since 2018), Arndt Röchling (CFO), Alexander Witte (CRO), Aleksei Mikhailov (CTO)
- Products: Retail and corporate banking
- Total assets: €12.9 billion (YE 2020)
- Owner: Sberbank (100%)
- Number of employees: Over 3,800 (YE 2020)
- Subsidiaries: Sberbank BH d.d. Sarajevo; Sberbank d.d.; Sberbank CZ, a.s.; branch Sberbank Direct (Germany); Sberbank Magyarország Zrt.; Sberbank Srbija a.d. Beograd; Sberbank banka d.d.
- Website: www.sberbank.at

Sberbank Europe Group (Sberbank Europe AG) was a banking group headquartered in Vienna, Austria, and owned by Sberbank, a Russian state-controlled company. Sberbank Europe provided financial services to over 780,000 customers in eight countries in Central and Eastern Europe.

== History ==
Sberbank Europe AG was established in 2012 after Sberbank acquired Volksbank International AG (VBI) and rebranded it Sberbank Europe. The deal involved all VBI assets – banks in Bosnia and Herzegovina, Croatia, Czech Republic, Hungary, Serbia, Slovenia, Ukraine and Slovakia, apart from Volksbank Romania. Société Générale and J.P.Morgan acted as financial advisors to Sberbank. Troika Dialog also advised on the transaction. The deal price was €505 million, which is 1.0x VBI book value (excluding Romania). Organizational transformation and group restructuring were exercised during that period. It was decided that the regional headquarters of Sberbank Europe Group would be in Vienna, Austria. In 2013, Sberbank Europe received a full banking license in Austria. Volksbank subsidiaries were fully rebranded as Sberbank by 2014.

Sberbank Europe obtained its first Fitch Ratings investment grade, BBB−, in 2013. Fitch affirmed its rating as BB+ with positive outlook in 2017. In 2019, Fitch upgraded the Long-Term Issuer Default Rating (IDR) to BBB− and confirmed it with a Stable Outlook in 2020.

In 2014 Sberbank Europe received a syndicated loan of €350m and launched Sberbank Direct in Germany, an online direct bank with basic retail products. Sberbank Direct gained €1.7 bn in deposits by 2015. In 2018, Sberbank Direct launched an online instant loan offer in Germany.

In 2015 Sberbank Europe sold 99.5% stake of its Slovak subsidiary, Sberbank Slovensko, to Penta Investments for an undisclosed price. Sberbank Europe AG completed the Comprehensive Assessment consisting of the Asset Quality Review (AQR) and the Stress Test conducted by the European Central Bank. In 2016, Sberbank finalized the sale of the Slovak subsidiary and converted €370m of subordinated loans (Tier II capital) into Common Equity Tier I capital, strengthening its capital structure. In December 2017, Sberbank Europe completed the sale of its stake of 99.9230% in PJSC «VS Bank» (Ukraine) to TAS Group.

2019 became Sberbank Europe's most successful financial year. The bank generated a profit after tax of EUR 40.6 million.

In 2018, Sberbank won in categories “Best Bank in CEE” by The Banker magazine, “Most Innovative Digital Bank in CEE” by Global Finance magazine and "Strongest Banking Brand in the World" by Brand Finance magazine. In 2020, Sberbank won the World’s Best Digital Bank Awards by Global Finance magazine. In 2021, the bank confirmed its title of the Strongest Banking Brand in the World according to Brand Finance.

=== Insolvency ===
In late February 2022, during the 2022 Russian invasion of Ukraine, bank runs and sanctions against the bank caused CNN to state the bank "...was failing, or likely to fail, because of "significant deposit outflows" triggered by the Ukraine crisis." The European Central Bank stated the outflows "led to a deterioration of its liquidity position. And there are no available measures with a realistic chance of restoring this position." On 1 March 2022, the Financial Market Authority of Austria (FMA) prohibited further operations.

On 2 March 2022, it was announced that Sberbank Europe Group is insolvent. On the same day, its Slovenian subsidiary was sold to NLB Group, while the Croatian subsidiary was sold to Hrvatska poštanska banka.

In Bosnia and Herzegovina, after the takeover from ASA banka and Nova Banka was allowed in March 2022 for two Bosnian Sberbank subsidiaries (Sberbank a.d. Banja Luka and Sberbank BH d.d. Sarajevo) continued to operate according to the rules of entity based banking regulators in BiH (FBA and ABRS). The Sarajevo based company was bought by ASA banka and operated under the name ASA banka Naša i snažna d.d. Sarajevo until the full integration with the parent ASA Banka, and the Banja Luka branch continued its operations (under Nova banka supervision) with the new presented name ATOS BANK a.d. Banja Luka.

== Ownership ==
Sberbank Europe Group is fully owned by Sberbank, a Russian company. The Ministry of Finance of Russia is the principal shareholder of Sberbank, owning 50% of the bank’s authorized capital plus one voting share, with the remaining 50% held by domestic and international investors.

== Management Board ==
The Management Board of Sberbank Europe AG consists currently of the following management board members:

- Sonja Sarközi, CEO
- Arndt Röchling, CFO
- Alexander Witte, CRO
- Aleksei Mikhailov, CTO

Sberbank Europe AG had also previously the following members of the Management Board:

- Stefan Zapotocky (Chief Corporate and Investment Banking Officer)
- Alexey Bogatov (CRO/CIO)
- Gerhard Randa, CEO
- Christian Kubitschek, CFO
- Axel Hummel, CEO
- Mark Arnold, CEO
- Igor Strehl (Chief Corporate and Investment Banking Officer)
- András Hámori, Retail
- Markus Krause, CRO
- Valentin Mihov (Strategie)
- David O'Mahony (CIO / COO)

== Operations ==
The bank has 187 branches in Central and Eastern Europe with over 3,800 employees (as of YE 2020).

Sberbank Europe Group AG operations can be divided into three core businesses: Retail business, Large corporate & investment banking and Small and medium-sized enterprise business. Retail business involves the provision of mortgages and consumer loans, savings and pension products and digital banking programs. Large corporate & investment banking includes corporate, real estate and acquisition financing as well as trade finance and treasury products. Small and medium-sized enterprise business offers liquidity financing (Working Capital/Overdraft), investment financing (equipment/business facilities), Treasury finance products and transaction business support.

=== Subsidiaries in Europe ===
Sberbank Europe Group AG was present in 8 markets in Central and Eastern Europe:

- Austria: Sberbank Europe AG
- Bosnia and Herzegovina (Sarajevo and Banja Luka): Sberbank BH d.d. Sarajevo, Sberbank a.d. Banja Luka
- Croatia: Sberbank d.d.
- Czech Republic: Sberbank CZ, a.s.
- Germany: Branch Sberbank Direct
- Hungary: Sberbank Magyarország Zrt
- Serbia: Sberbank Srbija a.d. Beograd
- Slovenia: Sberbank banka d.d.

Bank	Country	Number of branches (as of YE 2020)	Types of services	Sale/closure of subsidiary
Sberbank Europe	Austria	1	Corporate & investment banking, transactions and trade finance	Sold June 2023 to Austrian Stefan Zöchling
Sberbank d.d.	Croatia	31	Retail banking, Corporate banking, SME business	Sold March 2022 to Hrvatska Poštanska Banka d.d. (Croatia's Postbank)
Sberbank CZ, a.s.	Czech Republic	24	Retail banking, Corporate banking, SME business	30 April 2022 banking licence revoked and company put into liquidation 1 May 2022
Sberbank Direct	Germany	Pure online banking	Retail banking	
Sberbank Magyarország Zrt	Hungary	27	Retail banking, Corporate banking, SME business	In liquidation March 2022
Sberbank banka d.d	Slovenia	12	Retail banking, Corporate banking, SME business	Sold 1 March 2022 to Nova ljubljanska banka d.d.
Sberbank Srbija a.d. Beograd	Serbia	33	Retail banking, Corporate banking, SME business	Sold February 2022 to AIK Banka
BIH Sarajevo	Bosnia and Herzegovina	32	Retail banking, Corporate banking, SME business	Sold 2 March 2022 to ASA Banka
BIH Banja Luka	Bosnia and Herzegovina	27	Retail banking, Corporate banking, SME business	Sold May 2022 to Nova Banka / now ATOS Bank

== See also ==
- List of banks in Austria
