= List of banks in Bosnia and Herzegovina =

This is a complete list of banks in Bosnia and Herzegovina as of August 2026. Based on official lists from the Central Bank of Bosnia and Herzegovina, responsible for national bank regulation and registration in Bosnia and Herzegovina.

Bosnia and Herzegovina has two banking systems, one for each entity, the Federation of Bosnia and Herzegovina and Republika Srpska. Each entity has a specialised supervisory agency, the Banking Agency of the Federation of Bosnia and Herzegovina (FBA) and the Banking Agency of Republika Srpska (ABRS). Thus, each bank operating in Bosnia and Herzegovina must register with both banking systems if it intends to operate nationwide.

== Central bank ==
- Centralna banka Bosne i Hercegovine, located in Sarajevo - SWIFT Code: CBBSBA22XXX www.cbbh.ba

== Licensed commercial banks in the Federation of Bosnia and Herzegovina ==
As of 21 August 2026, there are 14 licensed commercial banks in the Federation of Bosnia and Herzegovina:

Bank name	Headquarters	Website	SWIFT Code	Owner/International group	ATM network membership
Addiko Bank	Sarajevo	www.addiko-fbih.ba	HAABBA22XXX	(Austria) Addiko Bank	Addiko Bank BiH
ASA Banka	Sarajevo	www.asabanka.ba	IKBZBA2XXXX	(Bosnia and Herzegovina) ASA Invest via ASA Finance (90.62%)	ATM Network BH mreža
Bosna Bank International	Sarajevo	www.bbi.ba	BBIBBA22XXX	(United Arab Emirates) Islamic Development Bank (45,46%), Dubai Islamic Bank (27,27%), Abu Dhabi Islamic Bank (27,27%)	ATM Network BH mreža
Intesa Sanpaolo banka	Sarajevo	www.intesasanpaolobanka.ba	UPBKBA22XXX	(Italy) Banca Intesa via Privredna banka Zagreb (99.99%)	No
Komercijalno-investiciona banka	Velika Kladuša	www.kib-banka.com.ba	KINBBA22XXX	(Bosnia and Herzegovina) Hasan Esmerović (20.68%) and others	No
NLB Banka	Sarajevo	www.nlb-fbih.ba	TBTUBA22XXX	(United States) BNY and others via NLB Group (97.34%)	NLB Bank BiH
Privredna banka Sarajevo	Sarajevo	www.pbs.ba	PBSCBA22XXX	(Bosnia and Herzegovina) Hamid Pršeš (14.84%) and others	ATM Network BH mreža
ProCredit Bank	Sarajevo	www.procreditbank.ba	MEBBBA22XXX	(Germany) ProCredit Holding	ProCredit Bank
Raiffeisen Bank	Sarajevo	www.raiffeisenbank.ba	RZBABA2SXXX	(Austria) Raiffeisen Bank International	Raiffeisen Banking Group
Razvojna banka Federacije BiH	Sarajevo	www.rbfbih.ba	IBBHBA22XXX	Government of the Federation of Bosnia and Herzegovina	No
Sparkasse Bank	Sarajevo	www.sparkasse.ba/	ABSBBA22XXX	(Austria) Steiermärkische Sparkasse (100.00%)	Erste Group
UniCredit Bank	Mostar	www.unicredit.ba	UNCRBA22XXX	(Italy) UniCredit Bank via Zagrebačka Banka (99.30%)	UniCredit Group BiH
Union Banka	Sarajevo	www.unionbank.ba	UBKSBA22XXX	Ministry of Finance of the Federation of Bosnia and Herzegovina (97.74%)	ATM Network BH mreža
ZiraatBank BH	Sarajevo	www.ziraatbank.ba	TZBBBA22XXX	(Turkey) Ziraat Finance Group	Ziraat Bank

== Licensed commercial banks in Republika Srpska ==
As of 21 August 2026, there are 8 licensed commercial banks in Republika Srpska:

Bank name	Headquarters	Website	SWIFT Code	Owner/International group	ATM network membership
Addiko Bank	Banja Luka	www.addiko-rs.ba	HAABBA2BXXX	(Austria) Addiko Bank (99.88%)	Addiko Bank BiH
ATOS Bank	Banja Luka	www.atosbank.ba	SABRBA2BXXX	(Bosnia and Herzegovina) MG-MIND via Nova Banka (100.00%)	ATM Network with Nova Banka
Banka Poštanska štedionica	Banja Luka	www.bpsbl.com	KOBBBA22XXX	(Serbia) Banka Poštanska štedionica (100.00%)	No
MF banka	Banja Luka	www.mfbanka.com	MFBLBA22XXX	(Bosnia and Herzegovina) MF Grupa (94.87%)	No
NLB Banka	Banja Luka	www.nlb-rs.ba	RAZBBA22XXX	(Slovenia) BNY and others via NLB Group	NLB Bank BiH
Nova Banka	Banja Luka	www.novabanka.com	NOBIBA22XXX	(Bosnia and Herzegovina) MG-MIND (100.00%)	ATM Network with ATOS Bank
Naša Banka	Banja Luka	www.nasa-banka.com	PAVLBA22XXX	(Serbia) GALENS via GI Finance (100.00%)	No
UniCredit Bank	Banja Luka	www.unicreditbank-bl.ba	BLBABA22XXX	(Italy) UniCredit Bank (99.67%)	UniCredit Group BiH

== Defunct & merged banks in Bosnia and Herzegovina ==
These are banks that either lost their licence due to accumulated debts and insolvency, or went into bankruptcy:

=== Defunct/non-operating banks ===
- Banka Srpske - Banja Luka
- Balkan Investment Bank - Banja Luka
- Bobar Banka - Bijeljina
- Glumina banka - Mostar
- Hercegovačka banka - Mostar
- IEFK Bank - Banja Luka
- Postbank BH - Sarajevor
- Camelija banka - Bihać
- International Commercial Bank - Sarajevo
- VB banka - Banja Luka
- Zepter Komerc bank - Banja Luka
- Privredna banka a.d. Istočno Sarajevo - East Sarajevo

=== Merged banks ===
- BOR Banka - Sarajevo
- Moja Banka - Sarajevo
- FIMA Banka - Sarajevo
- Volksbank a.d. - Banja Luka
- Volksbank d.d. - Sarajevo
- NLB Tuzlanska Banka - Tuzla
- Tuzlanska banka - Tuzla
- ABS Banka - Sarajevo
- Depozitna banka - Sarajevo
- Šeh-in banka - Zenica
- Investicijska Banka Federacije BiH - Sarajevo
- LT Gospodarska banka - Sarajevo
- Ljubljanska banka - Sarajevo
- Sberbank BH - Sarajevo
- Central Profit Banka - Sarajevo
- Universal banka - Sarajevo
- HVB CPB Banka - Sarajevo
- HVB Banka Bosna i Herzegovina - Sarajevo
- Nova Banjalučka banka - Banja Luka
- UPI banka - Sarajevo
- CBS Bank - Sarajevo
- Commercebank - Sarajevo
- Una banka - Bihać
- Auro Banka - Mostar
- Gospodarska banka - Mostar
- Vakufska banka - Sarajevo
- Sberbank a.d. - Banja Luka
- ASA Naša i snažna - Sarajevo

== Banking supervision and authorization ==
- Agencija za osiguranje depozita Bosne i Hercegovine (in English: Deposit Insurance Agency of Bosnia and Herzegovina)-independent, non-profit legal entity with powers provided for in accordance with the Law www.aod.ba
- Agencija za bankarstvo Federacije BiH (FBA) (in English: Banking Agency of the Federation of Bosnia and Herzegovina) - independent, sovereign and non-profit authority for bank supervision and licensing in the FBiH entity www.fba.ba
- Agencija za bankarstvo RS (ABRS) (in English: Banking Agency of Republika Srpska) - independent, sovereign and non-profit authority for bank supervision and licensing in RS entity www.abrs.ba

== Other financial institutions ==
- BAMCARD - www.bamcard.ba national payment clearing provider and processing center to financial institutions in Bosnia and Herzegovina
- BH mreža bankomata or ATM Network BH mreža - www.bhmreza.ba is ATM network with more than 150 ATMs operated by national processing center (BAMCARD) for the customers of four Bosnian partner banks (ASA Banka, Bosna Bank International, Privredna banka Sarajevo and Union Banka).
- KVIKO - www.kviko.ba is Bosnian member of European Mobile Payment Systems Association operated by BAMCARD (for customers of ASA Banka, Bosna Bank International and Union Banka)
- Investiciono-razvojna banka RS - local development bank serving RS entity in Bosnia and Herzegovina, from Banja Luka.
- Western Union services in Bosnia and Herzegovina
- MoneyGram - in Bosnia and Herzegovina
- Ria Money Transfer
- Eurogiro

== Representative offices of International financial institutions ==
- International Monetary Fund - Međunarodni monetarni fond, Bosnian office located in Sarajevo
- European Bank for Reconstruction and Development - Evropska banka za obnovu i razvoj za BiH - EBRD office in Sarajevo (Fra Anđela Zvizdovića 1, UNITIC)
- World Bank - The World Bank Group - Country Office for BiH in Sarajevo, Ured Svjetske banke u BIH, Sarajevo
- European Investment Bank - (EIB) Representation to Bosnia and Herzegovina in Sarajevo (Skenderija 3a, 71000 Sarajevo).
- Council of Europe Development Bank (Banka Vijeća Evrope) - Razvojna banka Vijeća Evrope (CEB) in BiH
- KfW - Njemačka razvojna banka - KFW u BiH
- The Saudi Fund for Development (SFD) - Saudijski fond za razvoj (SFD)
- The International Fund for Agricultural Development - (IFAD) - Međunarodni fond za poljoprivredni razvoj
- The Kuwait Fund for Arab Economic Development - Kuvajtski fond za arapski razvoj (KFAD)

== See also ==
- List of banks in Europe
- List of banks in Yugoslavia
