= Bosna Bank International =

Commercial bank in Bosnia and Herzegovina

- Trade name: BBI Banka
- Type: Private company (d.d. - dioničko društvo)
- Industry: Financial services Islamic banking
- Founded: 19 October 2000; 26 years ago as Bosna Bank International
- Headquarters: Sarajevo, Trg djece Sarajeva bb, 71000 Sarajevo (ARIA Centar), Bosnia and Herzegovina
- Number of locations: 32 branches (2024)
- Area served: Bosnia and Herzegovina
- Key people: Alek Bakalović (CEO)
- Parent: Islamic Development Bank (45,46%); Dubai Islamic Bank (27,27%); Abu Dhabi Islamic Bank (27,27%)
- Website: www.bbi.ba

Bosna Bank International d.d. Sarajevo, or simply BBI Banka, is a commercial bank serving Bosnia and Herzegovina headquartered in Sarajevo.

BBI banka was founded on 19 October 2000 as the first Sharia-compliant bank (Islamic bank) in Europe by Islamic Development Bank (45,46%), Dubai Islamic Bank (27,27%) and Abu Dhabi Islamic Bank (27,27%) from United Arab Emirates.

Bosna Bank International (SWIFT code: BBIBBA22XXX) is a member of Bosnian interbank ATM Network BH mreža operated by national payment clearing provider and processing center BAMCARD.

It is a member of Deposit Insurance Agency of Bosnia and Herzegovina (AOD) and it is supervised by FBA banking regulator based on CB BiH regulations.

On Bosnian market, business and operations of BBI Banka are conducted in accordance with the Shariah principles of transparent, fair, and socially responsible banking. This includes operating in a way which shares risk and reward equitably. No funds are invested in non-Shariah compliant industries such as arms, alcohol, tobacco, and adult entertainment. In cooperation with the Sarajevo Stock Exchange, the SASE Islamic Index was launched in 2006.

BBI Bank also offers consumer loans, credit and debit cards, mobile and e-banking, KVIKO and ATM services, housing loans and special housing loans for Bosnian diaspora via 32 branches (2024) in BiH towns.

The bank is the organizer of significant business and educational projects in Bosnia and Herzegovina, starting with real estate developments (notable project is ARIA Centar - ex BBI Centar in Sarajevo) to business events and educational partnership with UNSA, University of Sarajevo School of Economics and Business established the Center for Islamic Economics, Banking and Finance.

== Sarajevo Business Forum ==
Since 2010 and under the patronage of the Presidency of BiH entrepreneurs, investors, and other stakeholders from the Balkans, Europe, the Middle East, and beyond. Bosna Bank International has been organizing the Sarajevo Business Forum, an international investment annual conference that has gained a worldwide reputation and put Bosnia and Herzegovina and the Southeast Europe region on the investment map of the world.

== See also ==
- List of banks in Bosnia and Herzegovina
- Central Bank of Bosnia and Herzegovina
- Government of the Federation of Bosnia and Herzegovina
