= Raiffeisen Bank BiH =

Commercial bank in Bosnia and Herzegovina

Raiffeisen Bank Bosna i Hercegovina
- Trade name: Raiffeisen Bank BiH
- Native name: Raiffeisen Bank Bosna i Hercegovina
- Type: Private company (d.d. - dioničko društvo)
- Traded as: Sarajevo Stock Exchange: RFSNR
- Industry: Financial services
- Predecessor: Market Banka d.d. Sarajevo; Hrvatska Poštanska banka Mostar; Raiffeisen BANK HPB d.d. Mostar
- Founded: November 1992 as Market Banka d.d. Sarajevo; June 2000 as Raiffeisen Bank Bosna i Hercegovina d.d. Sarajevo (RZB BiH); May 2001 as Raiffeisen BANK HPB d.d. Mostar; 1 December 2002; 23 years ago as Raiffeisen BANK d.d. Bosna i Hercegovina
- Headquarters: Sarajevo, Zmaja od Bosne bb, Bosnia and Herzegovina
- Number of locations: 32 branches (2024)
- Area served: Bosnia and Herzegovina
- Key people: Peter Jacenko (Chairman of the Supervisory Board); James Daniel Stewart Jr (President of the Management Board)
- Parent: Raiffeisen Banking Group; Raiffeisen Bank International
- Subsidiaries: Raiffeisen CAPITAL a.d. Banjaluka; Raiffeisen INVEST društvo za upravljanje fondovima d.d. Raiffeisen LEASING d.o.o. Sarajevo; Raiffeisen Assistance d.o.o. Sarajevo; Sarajevska berza-burza d.d. Sarajevo ESP BH d.o.o. Sarajevo
- Website: www.raiffeisenbank.ba

Raiffeisen Bank d.d. Bosna i Hercegovina, also referred to as Raiffeisen Bank BiH (SWIFT code: RZBABA2S), is a financial institution in Bosnia and Herzegovina based in Sarajevo, and subsidiary of Raiffeisen Bank International.

Raiffeisen Bank BiH is a member of the Deposit Insurance Agency of Bosnia and Herzegovina (AOD) and is regulated by the Banking Agency of the Federation of Bosnia and Herzegovina (FBA), under the supervision of the Central Bank of Bosnia and Herzegovina (CB BiH).

It operates through 32 branches across Bosnia and Herzegovina as of 2024, providing financial services to a wide range of customers in various towns across the country.

== History ==
The bank began operations in November 1992 during the Siege of Sarajevo under the name Market Banka d.d. Sarajevo.

In October 2000, Raiffeisen Bank International acquired Market Banka d.d. Sarajevo and renamed it Raiffeisen Bank Bosna i Hercegovina d.d. Sarajevo (RZB BiH).

In May 2001, Raiffeisen Bank merged with Hrvatska Poštanska banka Mostar d.d. to create Raiffeisen BANK HPB d.d. Mostar. The bank has operated under its current name, Raiffeisen Bank d.d. Bosna i Hercegovina, since December 2002.

By December 2005, its market share in the Federation of Bosnia and Herzegovina reached 21 percent, making it the Federation's largest bank.

== See also ==
- List of banks in Bosnia and Herzegovina
- Central Bank of Bosnia and Herzegovina
- Raiffeisen Bank (Serbia)
