= Banka Poštanska štedionica Banja Luka =

Commercial bank in Bosnia and Herzegovina

- Trade name: Banka Poštanska štedionica Banja Luka; BPŠ Banka
- Native name: Банка Поштанска штедионица Бања Лука; БПШ банка
- Company type: Private company (a.d. - akcionarsko društvo)
- Traded as: BLSE KMCB-R-A
- Industry: Financial services
- Predecessor: Komercijalna banka a.d. Banja
- Founded: September 26, 2006 as Komercijalna banka a.d. Banja Luka; March 9, 2022 as Banka Poštanska štedionica Banja Luka
- Headquarters: Banja Luka, Jevrejska 69, 78000, Bosnia and Herzegovina
- Number of locations: 20 branches (2024)
- Area served: Bosnia and Herzegovina
- Key people: Boško Mekinjić (Chairman of the Supervisory Board); Bojan Kekić, (President of the Management Board)
- Parent: Poštanska štedionica Beograd
- Website: www.bpsbl.com

Banka Poštanska štedionica Banja Luka a.d. or simply Banka Poštanska štedionica is a commercial bank in Bosnia and Herzegovina.

It is headquartered in Banja Luka, as state-owned subsidiary of the Serbian bank from Poštanska štedionica a.d. Beograd.

With stakes (KMCB-R-A) listed on the Banja Luka Stock Exchange, Banka Poštanska štedionica (SWIFT code: KOBBBA22XXX ) on the address "Jevrejska 69, 78000", started operating under current name in 2022 in Republika Srpska entity.

In October 2021, Poštanska štedionica a.d. Beograd acquired former subsidiary of Komercijalna banka in Bosnia and Herzegovina.

On Bosnian market, Banka Poštanska štedionica Banja Luka continues the tradition of the former Bosnian branch of Komercijalna banka a.d. founded in Banja Luka on 26 September 2006.

It is a member of Deposit Insurance Agency of Bosnia and Herzegovina (AOD) and it is supervised by ABRS banking regulator based on CB BiH regulations.

Customers of BPŠ Banka can use debit and credit cards via national payment clearing provider and processing center BAMCARD, with m-banking and e-banking services for their current accounts and deposits via 20 branches (2024) in BiH towns.

== See also ==
- List of banks in Bosnia and Herzegovina
- Central Bank of Bosnia and Herzegovina
- Nova Banka
- Komercijalno-Investiciona Banka
- Privredna banka Sarajevo
