= Zloković =

Zloković is a surname. Notable people with the surname include:

- Boris Zloković (born 1983), Montenegrin retired water polo player
- Milan Zloković (1898-1965), Serbian architect
