= Privredna Banka Sarajevo =

Oldest bank in Bosnia and Herzegovina

Privredna banka Sarajevo
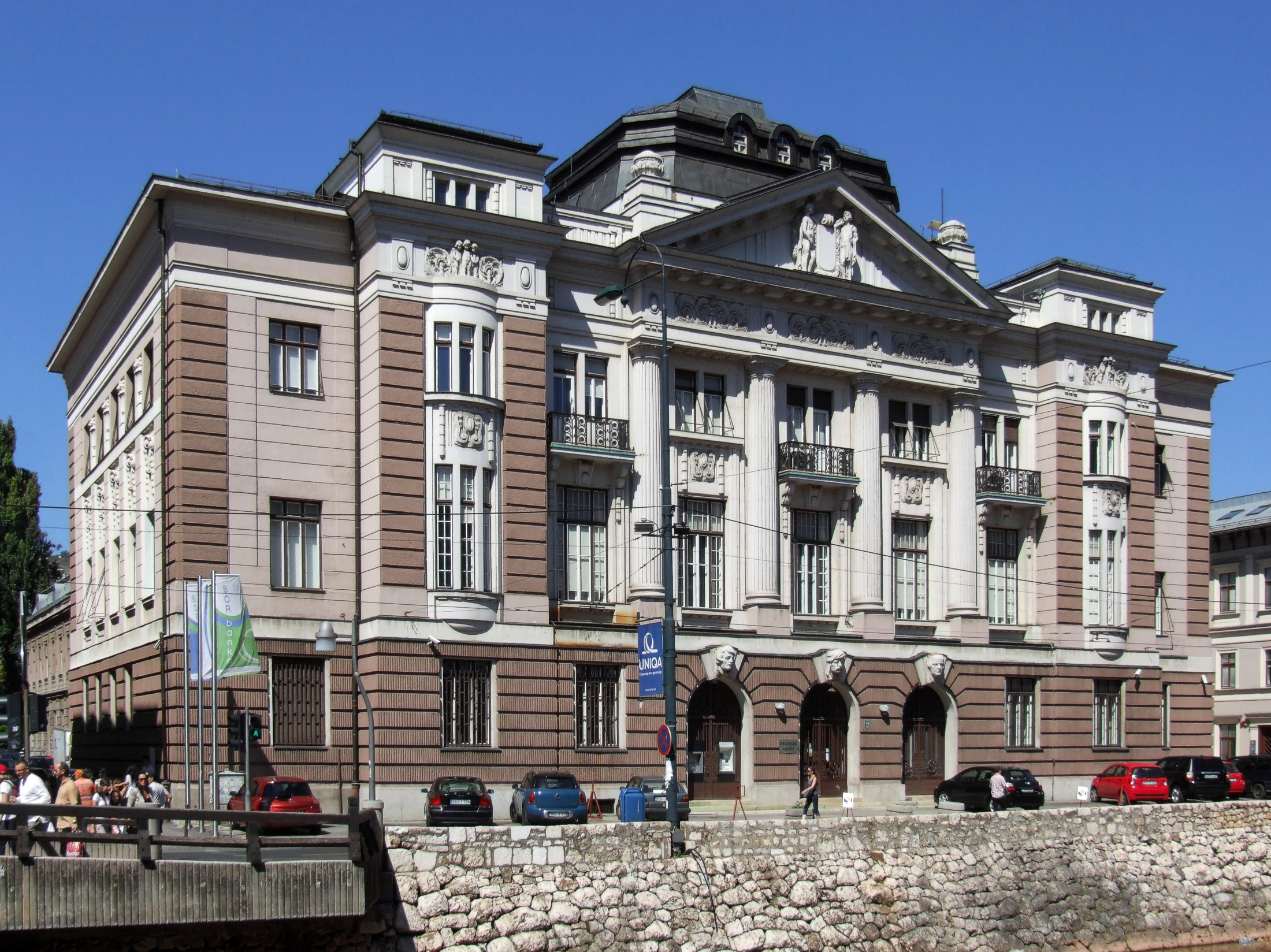
- The headquarters of Privredna Banka Sarajevo is the National monument of Bosnia and Herzegovina (Banka na Obali)
- Trade name: Privredna banka Sarajevo; PBS
- Type: State owned (d.d. - dioničko društvo)
- Traded as: Sarajevo Stock Exchange: BORBRK3
- Industry: Financial services
- Founded: January 1, 1962 as Privredna banka Sarajevo
- Successor: Bor Banka Sarajevo
- Headquarters: Sarajevo, Obala Kulina bana 18, 71000, BiH, Bosnia and Herzegovina
- Number of locations: 17 branches (2024)
- Area served: Bosnia and Herzegovina
- Key people: Rijad Raščić (Chairman of the Supervisory Board); Hamid Pršeš, (President of the Management Board)
- Website: www.pbs.ba

Privredna Banka Sarajevo d.d., or simply PBS, is the oldest commercial bank serving Bosnia and Herzegovina headquartered in Sarajevo.

== History ==
Privredna Banka Sarajevo started operating on January 1, 1962, in Socialist Republic of Bosnia and Herzegovina since when the Bank has been operating under this name for the first time. By the 1980s, it was one of nine associated banks that together formed the backbone of the commercial banking sector in Yugoslavia, together with Beogradska Banka and Jugobanka in Belgrade, Vojvođanska Banka in Novi Sad, Kosovska Banka in Pristina, United Bank of Croatia in Zagreb, Ljubljanska Banka, Stopanska Banka in Skopje, and Investment Bank Titograd.

On Bosnian market, PBS is branded as the commercial bank with oldest tradition with stakes listed on the Sarajevo Stock Exchange - majority private capital in Bosnia and Herzegovina.

As the commercial bank, Privredna Banka Sarajevo d.d. as name itself suggests (Privredna in Bosnian language means economic/bank for business), bank was the bearer of investment programs, encouraged the development of the economy of Bosnia and Herzegovina.

Since October 3, 2016, two domestic banks - Privredna banka Sarajevo d.d. Sarajevo and BOR bank d.d. Sarajevo - merged and operate under the unique name Privredna Banka Sarajevo (SWIFT code: PBSCBA22XXX) with the address Obala Kulina bana 18 (in ex headquarters of BOR banka d.d. Sarajevo.).

Privredna Banka Sarajevo is a member of Bosnian interbank ATM Network BH mreža operated by national payment clearing provider and processing center BAMCARD.

It is a member of Deposit Insurance Agency of Bosnia and Herzegovina (AOD) and it is supervised by FBA banking regulator based on CB BiH regulations.

Bank also offers consumer and business loans, housing loans, debit cards for customers in 17 branches: (2024) in BiH towns: Sarajevo, Old Town Sarajevo (Obala), Ilidža, Visoko, Usora, Olovo, Zenica, Goražde, Jablanica, Donji Vakuf, Maglaj, Jajce, Bugojno, Brčko and Gornji Rahić).

Customers of PBS can use debit and credit cards, e-banking/m-banking services for current accounts and deposits.

== Bank on the Obala ==
The headquarters of Privredna Banka Sarajevo in Sarajevo, near Miljacka river and Drvenija Bridge is the National monument of Bosnia and Herzegovina (registered as Zgrada Banke na Obali - Bank on the Obala) by the Bosnian national Commission to preserve national monuments of Bosnia and Herzegovina.

Originally, the bank building, locally known as Banka na Obali - served from 1913 as Bosnian branch office of the Austro-Hungarian Bank for Bosnia and Herzegovina.

After World War II, the bank building housed the Investment Bank.

In SR Bosnia and Herzegovina, as the parent bank, Privredna Banka Sarajevo made a system of local banks and branches mainly in the larger BiH cities (Zenica, Bijeljina, Mostar etc.), which later - at the beginning and during the Bosnian War, became separate local commercial banks by freezing or privatizing the assets of the PBS banking system in BiH which was created and developed in the former Yugoslavia.

After Bosnia and Herzegovina independence referendum, bank continued to operate in 1992 during the Siege of Sarajevo.

== See also ==
- List of banks in Bosnia and Herzegovina
- Central Bank of Bosnia and Herzegovina
- Razvojna banka Federacije BiH
- List of National Monuments of Bosnia and Herzegovina
