= Razvojna banka Federacije BiH =

National development bank in Bosnia and Herzegovina

- Trade name: Razvojna banka Federacije Bosne i Hercegovine
- Company type: State owned
- Industry: Financial services
- Founded: 1997; July 1, 2008 as Razvojna banka FBiH
- Successor: Investicijska banka Federacije Bosne i Hercegovine
- Headquarters: Sarajevo, Bosnia and Herzegovina
- Number of locations: 7 branches (2024)
- Area served: Federation of Bosnia and Herzegovina, BiH
- Website: www.rbfbih.ba

Razvojna banka FBiH or Razvojna banka Federacije Bosne i Hercegovine is a national development bank serving the Federation of Bosnia and Herzegovina entity in Bosnia and Herzegovina.

The bank has its headquarters located in Sarajevo (Novo Sarajevo area, Igmanska 1, 71000).

== History ==
The bank was founded in 1997 as Investicijska banka Federacije Bosne i Hercegovine.

On 1 July 2008, bank officially changed its name to the current name.

== Structure ==
The Government of the Federation of Bosnia and Herzegovina is the owner of the bank (via the Law on Development Bank of the Federation of Bosnia and Herzegovina), and bank is operating with state-owned capital.

The main task of the bank is the promotion of the development of the Bosnian market by extending loans, insuring export transactions against political and commercial risks, issuing guarantees, and providing business advices in cooperation with Bosnian banks and international institution via providing stimulating loans with stimulating and differentiated interest rates, usually lower than commercial interest rates in Bosnia and Herzegovina.

As an entity-level development bank, it is supervised by FBA banking regulator (based on Central Bank of Bosnia and Herzegovina regulations) in 7 branches in FBiH towns (Sarajevo, Mostar, Bihać, Orašje, Zenica, Tuzla and Livno).

== See also ==
- List of banks in Bosnia and Herzegovina
- Central Bank of Bosnia and Herzegovina
- Government of the Federation of Bosnia and Herzegovina
