= Kemal Kozarić =

2nd Governor of the Central Bank of Bosnia and Herzegovina
- In office 1 January 2005 – 11 August 2015
- Preceded by: Peter Nicholl
- Succeeded by: Senad Softić

Personal details
- Born: 13 October 1956 (age 69) Sarajevo, PR Bosnia and Herzegovina, FPR Yugoslavia
- Profession: Economist

Kemal Kozarić (born 13 October 1956) is a Bosnian economist who was most recently current dean of the School of Economics and Business Sarajevo.

He completed his elementary and high school education in Sarajevo, as well as graduating from the Faculty of Economics of University of Sarajevo in 1981, in the Marketing Department. He successfully defended his M.A. thesis "Perspectives of the Monetary Policy Model of Bosnia and Herzegovina on the Path Towards the European Union" in September 2006, which promoted him into Master in Economics. At the same faculty he defended doctoral dissertation on the subject "Impact of Credit Growth on the Economic Development of Transitional Countries", and thereby he acquired the academic degree of the Ph.D. in economics on 11 February 2009.

He worked for 15 years in banking, and from 1996 until beginning of 2000, he was the minister of finance in Sarajevo Canton Government. After that he was appointed vice governor of the Central Bank of Bosnia and Herzegovina. Based on the decision of the BH presidency dated 20 May 2003, he was appointed member of the governing board of the Central Bank, while continue to perform his duties of the CBBH vice governor.

On 1 January 2005, Kozarić became governor of the Central Bank of Bosnia and Herzegovina and chairman of the Central Bank governing board, replacing Peter Nicholl. He was re-appointed to the Central Bank governing board by the Bosnian presidency on 10 June 2009, and the governing board of the Central Bank re-appointed him for governor for a second term.

Kozarić was elected deputy chairman of the Governors’ Club of Central Banks of Central Asia, Black Sea Region, and the Balkans’ Countries for the period 2007–2008. In 2007 he has been appointed to the chairman position of the BH Deposit Insurance Agency governing board.

Since 2005, Kozarić has delivered many lectures at various faculties and academic gatherings and presented a number of papers at conferences abroad and in the country. In this period he has published a number of texts on actual subjects from the banking area and on modern trends in economy of BH and the region, published in professional magazines. He is also a co-author, together with Nikola Fabris, of a book titled "Monetary-credit policy". He received numerous awards, among which are the award for successful conducting of stable monetary policy and award for the contribution to the keeping of stability of the banking sector in Bosnia and Herzegovina.
