= Jasmina Selimović =

Governor of the Central Bank of Bosnia since 2024

Governor of the Central Bank of Bosnia and Herzegovina
- Incumbent
- Assumed office 3 January 2024
- Preceded by: Senad Softić

Personal details
- Born: 29 July 1979 (age 47) Sarajevo, Yugoslavia
- Education: University of Sarajevo

Jasmina Selimović (born 29 July 1979) is a Bosnian economist and academic. She has been serving as Governor of the Central Bank of Bosnia and Herzegovina since 2024, and is the first woman to hold that post.

== Early life ==
Selimović was born on 29 July 1979 in Sarajevo, Yugoslavia. She got a degree in economics for the University of Sarajevo, where completed a postgraduate studies on business economy and actuarial and insurece, and a PhD in economics in 2012 with a thesis about actuarial science which she prepared in the United States.

== Career ==
She has been a full professor in the Department of Finance and of the Quantitative Economics at the University of Sarajevo since 2004. She was appointed dean of the Faculty of Economics in 2018 and was renovated for a four-year mandate in 2022. She has been a visiting professor at the University of Nebraska–Lincoln (USA) and Istanbul University.

Selimović works also as an international expert for the accreditation of insurance companies in EU countries and is licensed to audit banks and financial institutions, as well actuary and legal expert in economics.

She is the author and co-author of several books and professional articles, and has participated in international conferences and projects.

Between 2011 and 2015, she was the Prime Minister's representative to the advisory group of the Fiscal Council of Bosnia, and since 2021 she has been chair of the Board of Directors of the Health Insurance Institute of the Sarajevo Canton.

Selimović was appointed by the President of Bosnia and Herzegovina as a member of the Governing Board of the Central Bank of Bosnia and Herzegovina and the first female Governor on 3 January 2024 replacing Senad Softić and after a political deadlock in the election of the office. She announced that it would maintain the currency board and the stability of the institution.

In February 2024 Meliha Bašić succeeded her as Dean of the Faculty of Economics.
