= Peter Nicholl =

New Zealand economist (born 1944)

Peter Nicholl QSO

1st Governor of the Central Bank of Bosnia and Herzegovina
- In office 20 June 1997 – 31 December 2004
- Preceded by: Office established
- Succeeded by: Kemal Kozarić

Personal details
- Born: Peter William Ernest Nicholl; 1944 (age 81–82) Hamilton, New Zealand
- Profession: Economist

Peter William Ernest Nicholl QSO (born 1944) is a New Zealand economist.

== Early life and education ==
Nicholl was born in Hamilton, New Zealand and was educated at Victoria University of Wellington where he completed a BCA.

== Career ==
Nicholl joined the Reserve Bank of New Zealand where he worked for 22 years. He was chief economist for five years and deputy governor and deputy chief executive from 1990 to 1995.

In 1995, he became an executive director on the World Bank board representing New Zealand, Australia, Korea, Cambodia, Mongolia and seven Pacific island nations.

Nicholl is currently a member of the governing board at the Central Bank of Bosnia and Herzegovina (CBBH). He was Governor of the CBBH from 1997 to 2004, during which time the central bank introduced its own currency and was established as an institution across the whole country.

In the 2006 New Year Honours, Nicholl was appointed a companion of the Queen's Service Order for public services.

== Personal life ==
Nicholl resides in New Zealand with his second wife and daughter Lily. He has three adult children (Hilary, Linda and Roger) from his first marriage.
