= Komercijalno-Investiciona Banka =

Commercial bank in Bosnia and Herzegovina

Komercijalno-investiciona banka
- Trade name: KIB banka Komercijalno-investiciona banka Velika Kladuša
- Company type: Private company (d.d. - dioničko društvo)
- Traded as: Sarajevo Stock Exchange: KIBBR
- Industry: Financial services
- Founded: 1998
- Headquarters: Velika Kladuša, Tone Hrovata bb, Bosnia and Herzegovina
- Number of locations: 6 branches (2024); 4 exchange offices (2024)
- Area served: Bosnia and Herzegovina; Una-Sana Canton
- Key people: Eveldin Hadžalić (Chairman of the Supervisory Board); Hasan Porčić, (President of the Management Board)
- Website: www.kib-banka.com.ba

Komercijalno-investiciona banka d.d., or simply KIB banka, is a commercial bank in Bosnia and Herzegovina. It is headquartered in Velika Kladuša, Una-Sana Canton.

In Bosnia, KIB banka is branded as only commercial bank headquartered in Una-Sana Canton with majority private-owned capital in Bosnia and Herzegovina.

Komercijalno-investiciona banka (SWIFT code: KINBBA22XXX) with the address Tone Hrovata bb, Velika Kladuša, 77230, BiH) started operating in 1998 in Velika Kladuša with stakes (KIBBR) listed on the Sarajevo Stock Exchange.

KIB banka in Bosnian language Komercijalna means commercial-private bank while Investiciona means investment bank) was the bearer of investment programs, encouraged the development of the economy of Bosanska Krajina area in Bosnia and Herzegovina.

KIB banka is a member of Deposit Insurance Agency of Bosnia and Herzegovina (AOD) and it is supervised by FBA banking regulator based on CB BiH regulations.

Customers of KIB can use debit and credit cards via national payment clearing provider and processing center BAMCARD, e-banking services for current accounts and deposits via 6 branches and 4 exchange offices (2024) in BiH towns: Velika Kladuša, Bihać, Bosanska Krupa, Cazin, Bužim and Sanski Most.

On November 2, 2023, based on the results in the asset and liability matching category, KIB Banka received the highest financial award in BiH - the "Zlatni BAM" annual award as an indicator of the quality of work and sustainability of "small" banks. This is an award that has already been awarded for 21 year in BIH is awarded by the financial and business magazine "Banks & Biznis in BiH".

== See also ==
- List of banks in Bosnia and Herzegovina
- Central Bank of Bosnia and Herzegovina
- Razvojna banka Federacije BiH
- Una-Sana Canton
