= Pošta Srbije =

National postal service of Serbia

Pošta Srbije d.o.o.
- Native name: Пошта Србије д.о.о. / Pošta Srbije d.o.o.
- Formerly: JP "Pošta Srbije" JP PTT saobraćaja "Srbija"
- Company type: State-owned enterprise
- Industry: Postal service courier
- Founded: 28 December 1989; 36 years ago (Current form); 7 June 1840; 186 years ago (Founded)
- Headquarters: Takovska 2, Belgrade, Serbia
- Key people: Zoran Anđelković (Director)
- Services: Letter post, parcel service, EMS, delivery, freight forwarding, third-party logistics
- Revenue: ▼€235.02 million (2022)
- Net income: ▼€30.56 million (2022)
- Total assets: ▼€342.08 million (2022)
- Total equity: ▼€262.91 million (2022)
- Number of employees: 14,831 (2022)
- Subsidiaries: MOBTEL-PTT d.o.o. Belgrade; Poštanska štedionica a.d. Belgrade
- Website: posta.rs
- Footnotes / references Business ID: 07461429; Tax ID: 100002803

Pošta Srbije (Serbian Cyrillic: Пошта Србије, lit. 'Post of Serbia') is the national postal service of Serbia, with the headquarters in Belgrade. Public postal service was first introduced in Serbia in 1840. The first stamp was printed in 1866. In 1874 it founded the Universal Postal Union together with 21 other countries.

== History ==
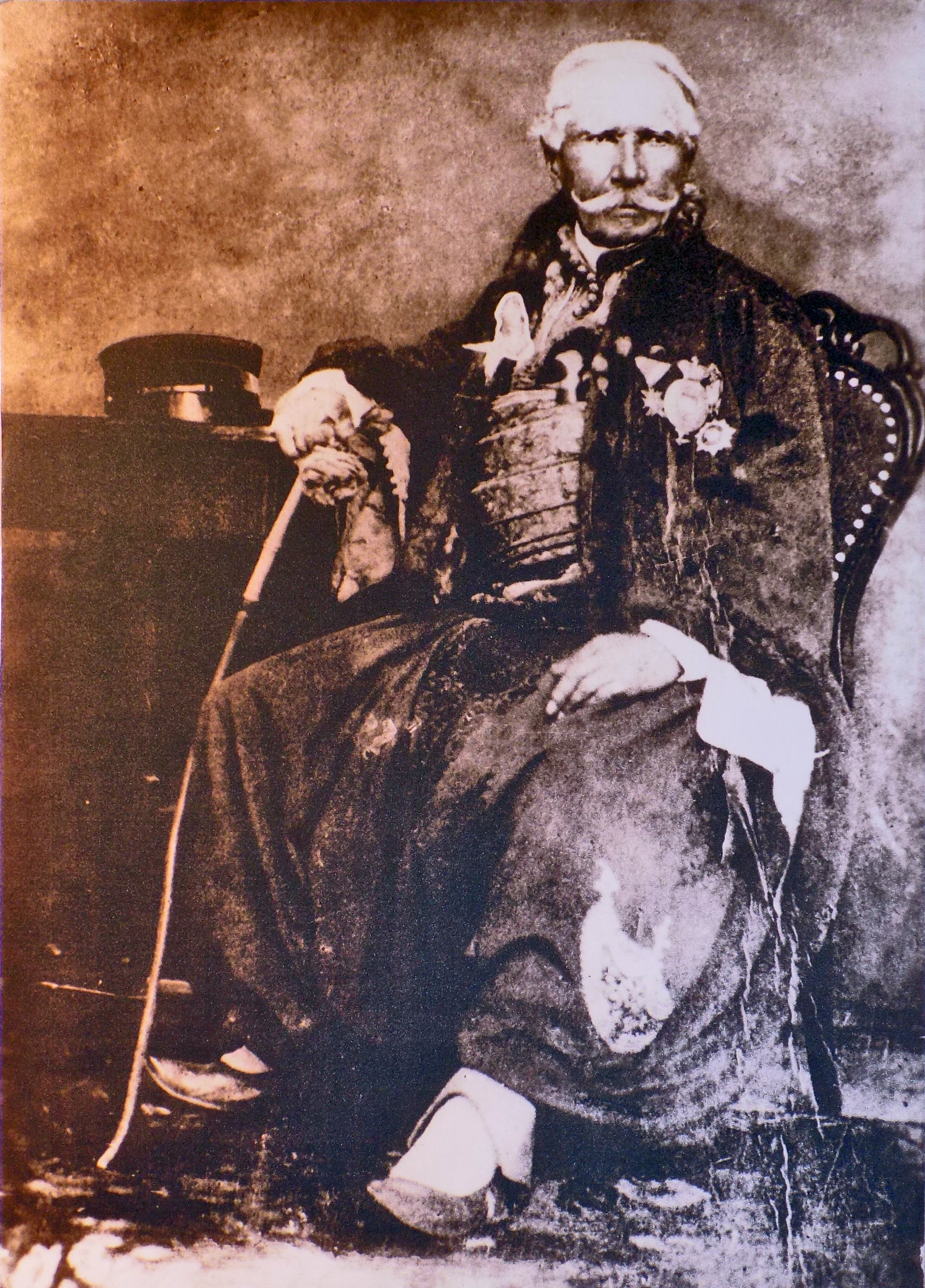
Rista Prendić, princely Tatar (courier) of Serbia until 1892

- 1840 – First public postal service introduced in Serbia
- 1866 – The first Postal Law was passed and the first postal stamp was issued.
- 1874 – Serbia among 21 founding members of Universal Postal Union in Bern, Switzerland.
- 1945 – Serbian Post becomes state-owned enterprise.
- 1989 – Serbian post restructured as Public Enterprise of PTT Saobraćaja "Srbija".
- 1997 – PTT Saobraćaja "Srbija" transformed into holding company (Telekom Srbija founded).
- 2001 – Serbia re-entered the Universal Postal Union
- 2003 – Rail transport of postal items discontinued.
- 2005 – New Postal Services Law enacted.
- 2010 – Law on Postal Services amended and implementation of several by-laws
- 2010 – Pošta Srbije transfers all rights and shares of Telekom Srbija to government of Serbia.
- 2011 – Pošta Srbije increases shares in Poštanska štedionica to 49%. (as of December 2021, it has 17.94% of shares)

== Ownership, structure and equity capital ==
By the Act on Communication System, the Public Enterprise of PTT Saobraćaja "Srbija" was established in 1990 as the company for performance of postal activities, with assets in state ownership. In May 1997, by the modifications and amendments to the Act on Communication Systems, the enterprise was organized as holding company, consisting of the PE of PTT Saobraćaja "Srbija" and its subsidiary companies. The enterprise is the parent company in the holding system.

In the same year, the subsidiary company for provision of telecommunication services: Telecommunications company Telekom Srbija was established.

Former logo of Pošta Srbije

Public Enterprise of "Pošta Srbije" is one of the founders in the following companies: Telecommunications company Telekom Srbija and bank Poštanska štedionica.

== Statutory bodies ==
- Managing Board – is the managing body of Enterprise. Nine members are appointed by the Government of Serbia, three of which are appointed among the employees.
- Chief Executive Officer (CEO) – is the Enterprise executive body. Appointed and dismissed by the Government of Serbia, pursuant to the procedure prescribed by the law.
- Supervising body – supervises the enterprise operations. Five members are appointed by the Government of Serbia, two of which are appointed among the employees.

== Capacities ==
The operational network of the PE of PTT communications "Srbija" is the largest infrastructure and logistic network in the country, engaging the following functional capacities for the performance of the postal activities:

- 1,512 post offices (784 of which are operating in Post Net System)
- 4,100 counters (over 3,000 automated counters)
- 3 main Sorting Centres
- 17 postal centres
- 1 office of exchange
- 3 customs offices
- 194 franchises
- 3,646 delivery areas
- 3,092 mail boxes
- 7,000 transportation units
- 7 Post Shops

== Postal services ==
=== Postal activity ===
- Letters
- Parcels
- Financial – Pošta Srbije provides numerous and diversified services in the domain of financial operations, both to private and business customers.

=== IT services ===
- KDS – Cable Distribution System – provides transmission of radio and TV signals, broadband Internet access and a number of other interactive services.
- Pošta Net – the largest national Internet service provider.
- CePP – Center for PTT e-business – Multimedia contract centre, providing electronic operations services with the first rate protection system of transferred information.

=== Commercial services ===
- Post Express – courier door-to-door service, enabling the fastest and safest transfer and delivery of items, both inland and abroad.
- Post Sped – Renders service of mediation between customers and customs service at import and export of postal items.
- Business Service – A special organizational unit providing an integrated service, consisting of collection of merchandise at the address, receipt of order, storage, personalization of postal items, delivery of merchandise and charging for the service at delivery.
- Direct Mail – a powerful marketing means that facilitates advertising information transfer, purchase bids transfer, collection of customers marketing data, etc.
- catalogue Sale – an integrated service of flyer distribution, delivery of catalogues, transfer of order forms, delivery and collection of ordered merchandise.
- Electronic Money Order – service providing payment to recipient, immediately after the remitter has effected the payment.
- Money Transport – a service providing constant monitoring of money transport by means of satellite positioning system.
- MMS Postcard – service enabling the users of MTS (Mobile Telephony of Serbia) to send a postcard via MMS (multimedia message service) to any address within the territory of Republic of Serbia, from any location (roaming service included), at any time.
- ADSL – fast internet connection.
- Renting of advertising space in over 1650 poster frames in 364 post offices in more than 200 cities and places all over Serbia.
- Personalized Postal Stamp – Postal Stamp with personal motif.
