= Milan Zloković =

Serbian architect

- Born: April 6, 1898; Trieste, Austria-Hungary
- Died: May 29, 1965 (aged 67); Belgrade, Socialist Federal Republic of Yugoslavia

Milan Zloković (Serbian Cyrillic: Милан Злоковић) (Trieste, April 6, 1898 - Belgrade, May 29, 1965) was a Serbian architect. His works epitomised two epochs of architecture in Belgrade.

== Biography ==
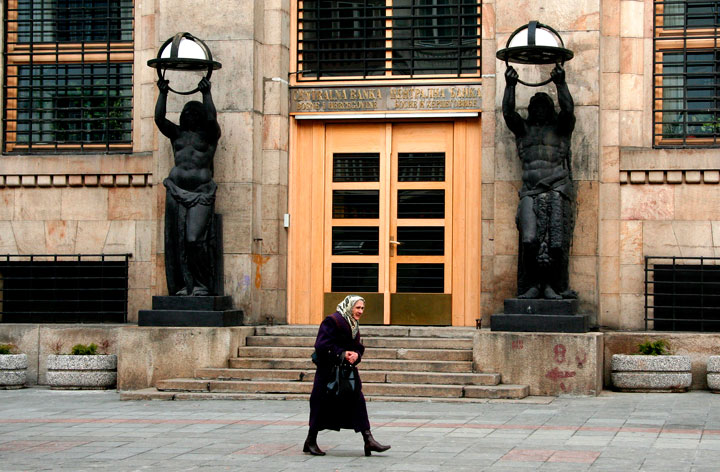
Entrance portal of the Mortgage Bank building in Sarajevo

Zloković studied in Graz (1916–18) and Belgrade (1919–21), as well as Paris (Ecole Superieure des Arts, 1921–23). He pioneered modernism in Yugoslav architecture, animating from 1928 to 1934 together with B. Kojić, J. Dubovi and D. Babić the Group of Architects of the Modern Style (Grupa Arhitekata Modernog Pravca, GAMP). From 1923 till 1963 he was a professor at the University of Belgrade Faculty of Architecture, exerting a great influence on several generations of Yugoslav architects.

Zloković authored what is deemed the most important work of Serbian modernism, the University Children's Clinic (1933). Other main works include:

- Duplex villa, Rankeova St. No. 12–14, Belgrade (1926);
- the Josif Šojat's House, Kralja Milutina St. No. 33, Belgrade (1926–27);
- the Church of Saint Sava (1927–28, design),
- the Building of Kolarčev People's University (1928, design);
- Marine Museum in Split (1928, design);
- the House of Nevena Zamborski, Dalmatinska St. No. 79, Belgrade (1928–29);
- the Mortgage Bank in Sarajevo (1928–31, design);
- the “Opel” Building, Narodnog fronta St. Belgrade (1930–31);
- the Hotel “Žiča” in Mataruška Banja (1931–32);
- the Gymnasium in Jagodina (1937–40),
- the Building of “FIAT” in Belgrade(1939–40);
- the Tourist Settlement in Ulcinj (1962–65).
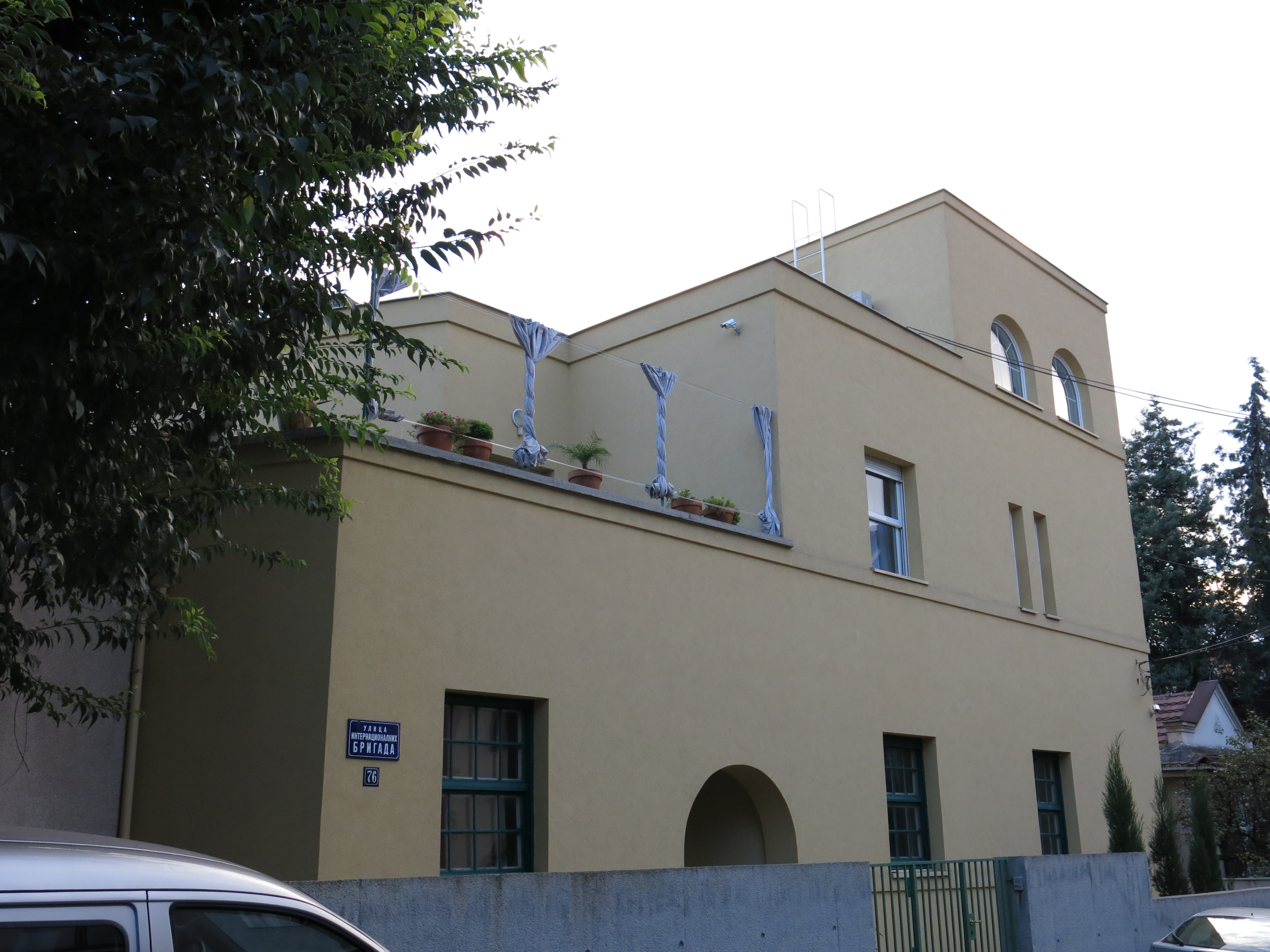
Zloković House in Belgrade 1927)

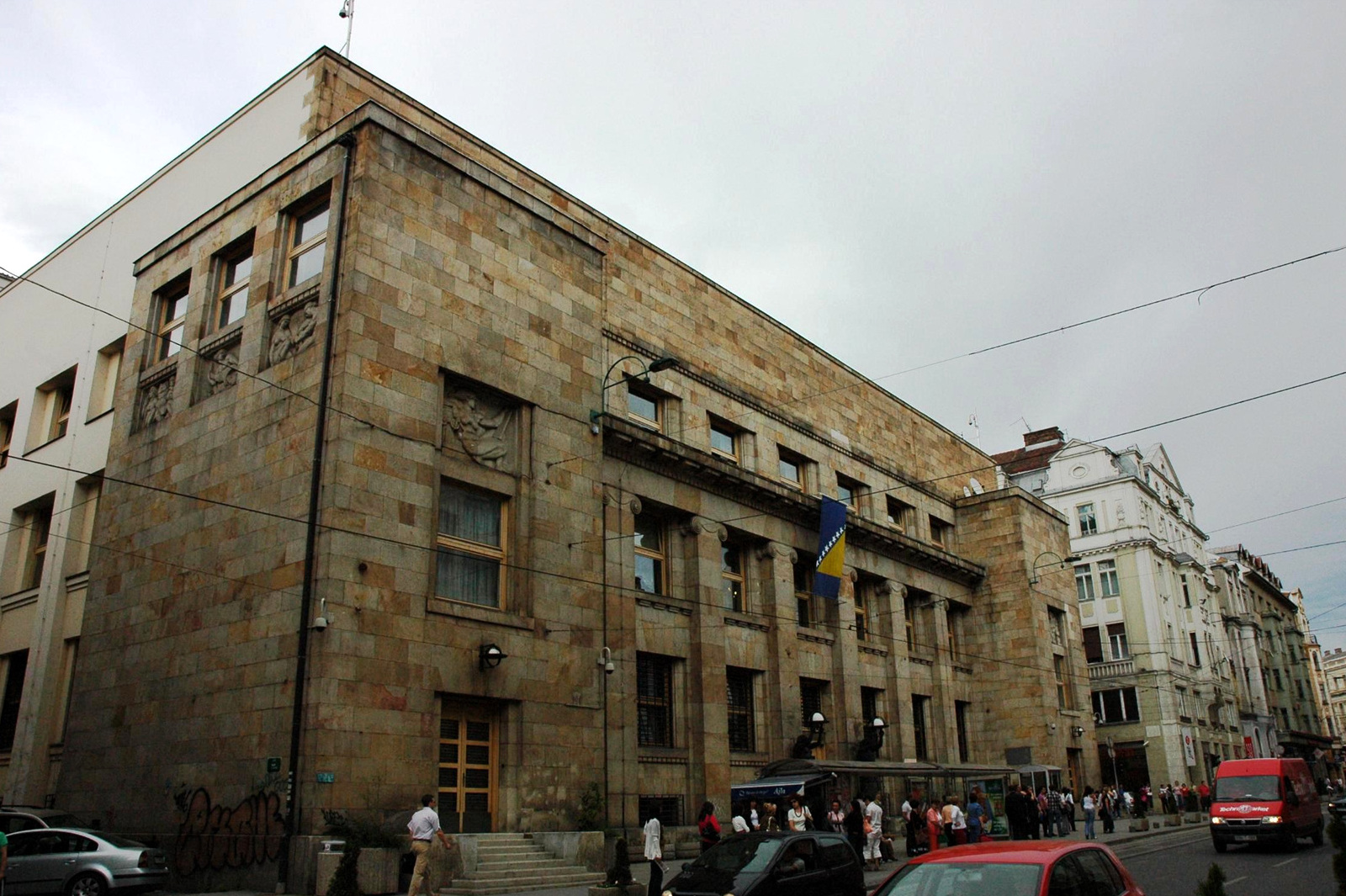
National Bank in Sarajevo (1929)

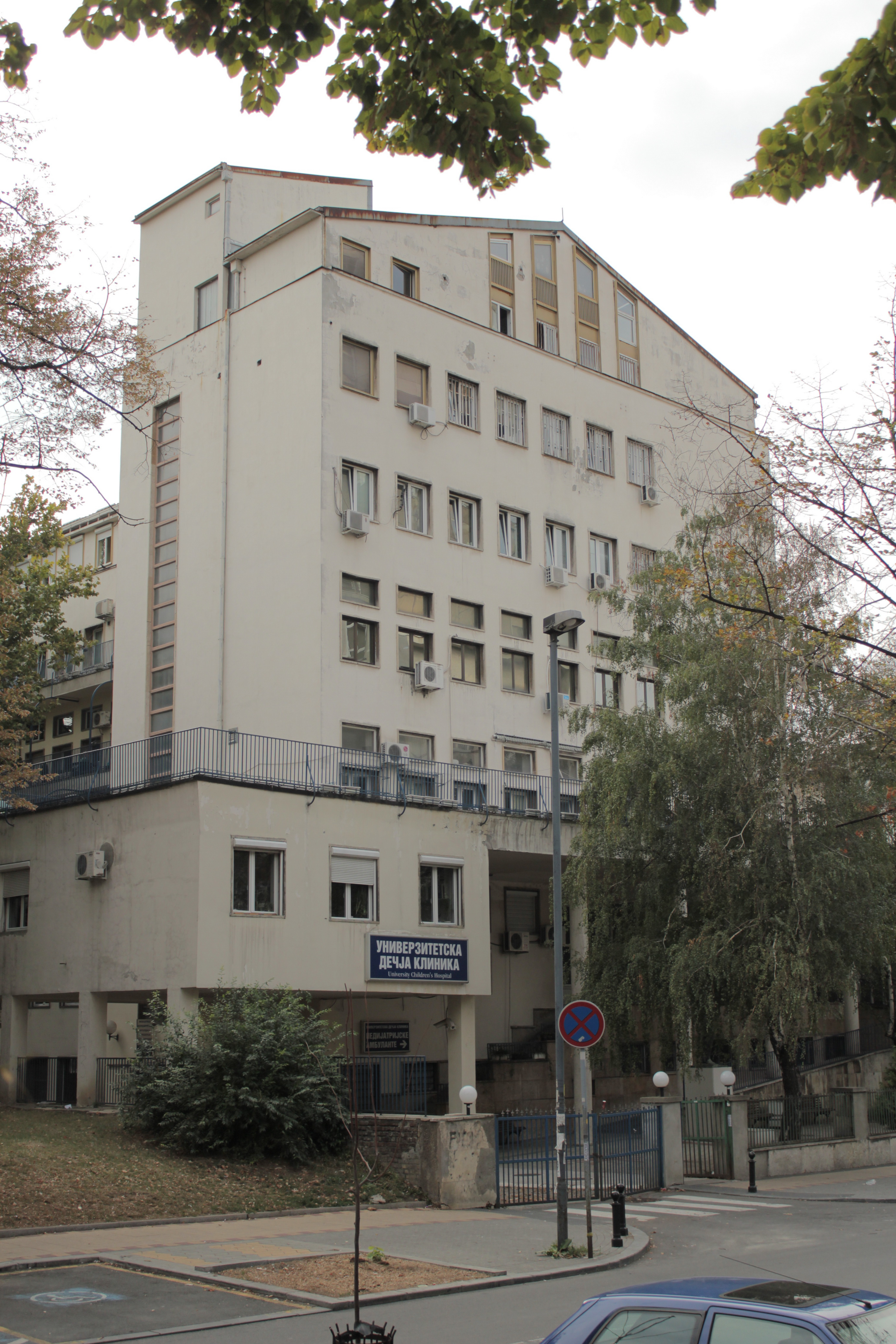
University Children's Clinic in Belgrade (1933)

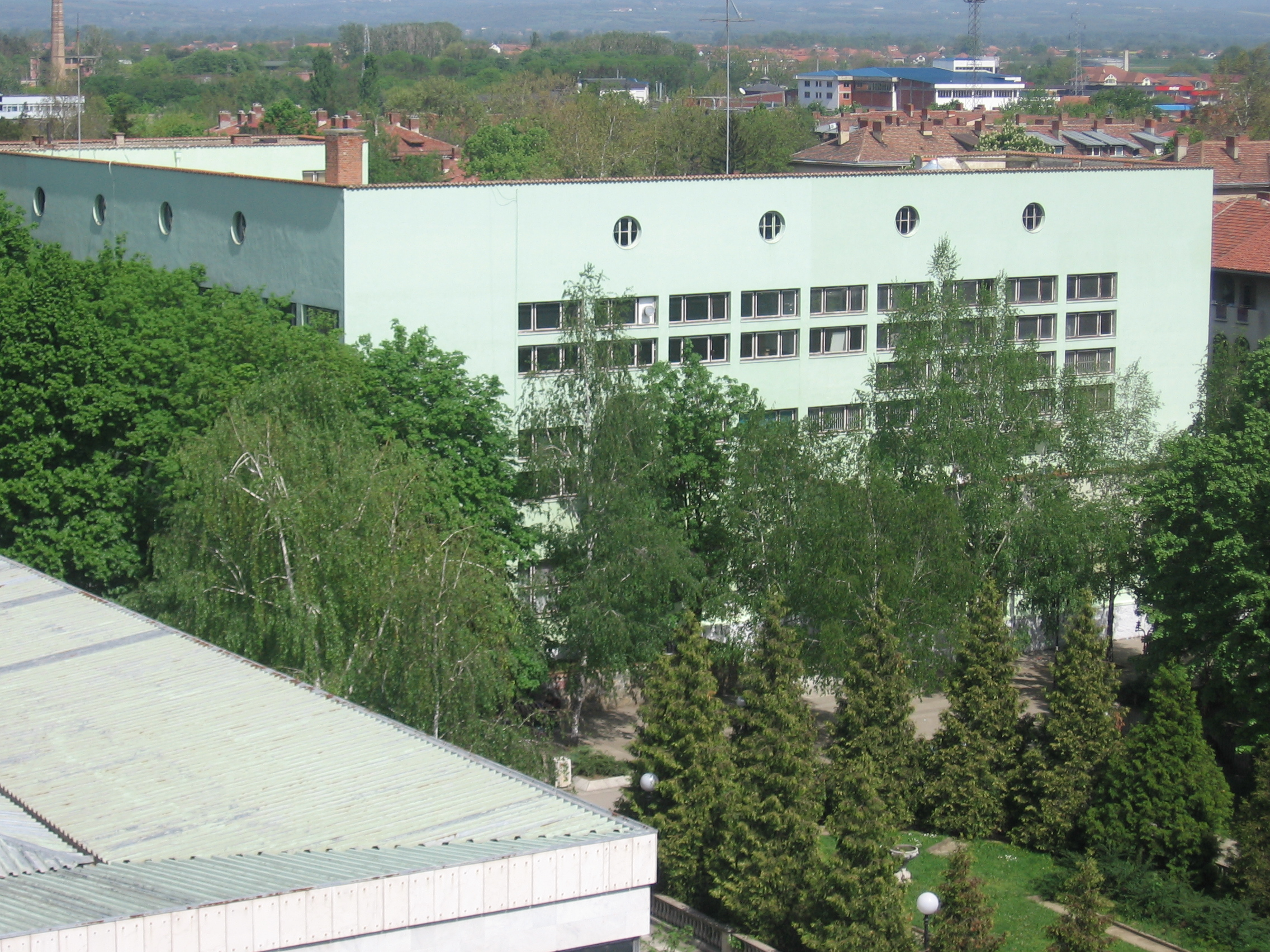
Gymnasium in Jagodina (1937-40)

According to the critics, "his work evolved from academia and folklorism to a final expression in modernism. He nourished a Mediterranean feeling for order, harmony, clarity of shape and a good understanding of the function of space. Apart from pure design, also achieved renown as a theoretician, especially in the fields of the problems of proportions and modular coordination."

== Selected publications ==
- The Group of Architects of Modernist Direction, Politika, 20. 12. 1928;
- Modern architecture in Belgrade, Stavba, 12, Prague 1929;
- Stara i nova shvatanja, Arhitektura, 5, Ljubljana 1932, 143–144;
- Glavna obeležja savremene arhitekture, Smena, Belgrade 1938, 86–88;
- O problemu modularne koordinacije, mera u arhitektonskom projektovanju, Tehnika, 2, Belgrade 1954, 169–182;
- Uloga neprekidne podele ili “zlatnog preseka” u arhitektonskoj kompoziciji, Pregled arhitekture, 1, 2 и 3, Belgrade 1954–55, 11–17, 44–48 and 80–85;
- Divina proportio = sectio aurea, Pregled arhitekture, 4–5, Belgrade 1955–56, 126–127.

== See also ==
- List of Serbian architects
- List of Serbian painters
- Serbs in Italy
