= Banka Poštanska štedionica =

Serbian banking and financial services company

- Native name: Банка Поштанска штедионица а.д. Београд
- Romanized name: Banka Poštanska štedionica a.d. Beograd
- Type: Joint-stock company
- Traded as: BELEX: PSBN
- Industry: Financial services
- Founded: 26 June 1921; 105 years ago
- Headquarters: Kraljice Marije 3, Belgrade
- Area served: Serbia; Bosnia and Herzegovina
- Key people: Bojan Kekić (CEO)
- Products: Retail banking; Commercial banking; Investment banking; Investment management; Public finance
- Revenue: ▲€210.71 million (2025)
- Net income: ▲€67.15 million (2025)
- Total assets: ▲€5.417 billion (2025)
- Total equity: ▲€474.87 million (2025)
- Owner: Government of Serbia (80.35%); Pošta Srbije (12.18%); Telekom Srbija (6.84%); Others (As of 30 October 2026)
- Number of employees: 2,884 (2025)
- Website: posted.co.rs

Banka Poštanska štedionica a.d. Beograd (Serbian: Банка Поштанска штедионица а.д. Београд) is a commercial bank in Serbia.

== History ==
Poštanska štedionica ("Postal Savings") was founded in 1921 in Belgrade after the adoption of the Law on postal savings service. By 1926 it had become the main financial savings institution in Kingdom of Yugoslavia, with branches in all postal offices in the entire county. It practiced a policy of financial transactions free of any taxes, intended to motivate the population to save capital.

In 1969, the offices were equipped with the first IBM computers. Poštanska štedionica became the first financial institution in Yugoslavia to introduce the credit cards. In 2002, Poštanska štedionica becomes a fully operational bank, and, in 2006, it changed its name to Banka Poštanska štedionica It is listed on Belgrade Stock Exchange since 2006.

In 2013, Serbian Ministry of Finance proposed to the government that bank takes over all insured and uninsured deposits and parts of assets of the majority state-owned Privredna banka Beograd which has lost licence for banking. Later, in late January 2014, another state-owned Univerzal banka has lost its licence and Poštanska štedionica took their clients.

In 2021, Poštanska štedionica acquired minor Mts banka. In 2021, Poštanska štedionica acquired former subsidiary of Komercijalna banka in Bosnia and Herzegovina. Since 2022, bank operates in Bosnia and Herzegovina under name Banka Poštanska štedionica Banja Luka.

On 2 November 2026, Poštanska štedionica requested the additional professional oversight in monitoring liquidity and financial flows from the National Bank of Serbia; the move came three days after Alta banka got its operating license revoked due to illiquidity concerns.

== See also ==
- List of banks in Yugoslavia
- List of banks in Serbia
