= ATM Network BH mreža =

BH mreža bankomata or ATM Network BH mreža
- Operating area: Bosnia and Herzegovina
- Members: Bosna Bank International; ASA Banka; Privredna banka Sarajevo; Union Banka
- ATMs: ± 220
- Founded: April 10, 2013

BH Mreža bankomata or ATM Network BH mreža is Bosnian interbank network operated by national payment clearing provider and processing center BAMCARD.

After the formal signing of the agreement on April 10, 2013, the management of four banks from Bosnia and Herzegovina initiated cooperation with the aim of forming a joint ATM network of BAMCARD member banks (BH network):

- Bosna Bank International
- Privredna banka Sarajevo
- Union Banka
- ASA Banka

Users can withdraw money free of charge from more than 220 ATMs of this network.

BH Mreža bankomata is the third largest ATM network in Bosnia and Herzegovina and is continuously expanding and improving, offering ATM services in Bosnian language but also in English to holders of international ATM cards (which include Mastercard, Visa).

For customers of ASA Banka, Bosna Bank International and Union Banka, additional service at BH mreža bankomata ATMs is KVIKO service that offers withdrawal of money at an ATM, without a (presented) card, by selecting the KVIKO option for entering the money withdrawal code on ATM.

KVIKO is Bosnian member of European Mobile Payment Systems Association operated by BAMCARD.
