= Austrian Volksbank Group =

Bank in Austria

Association of Volksbanks

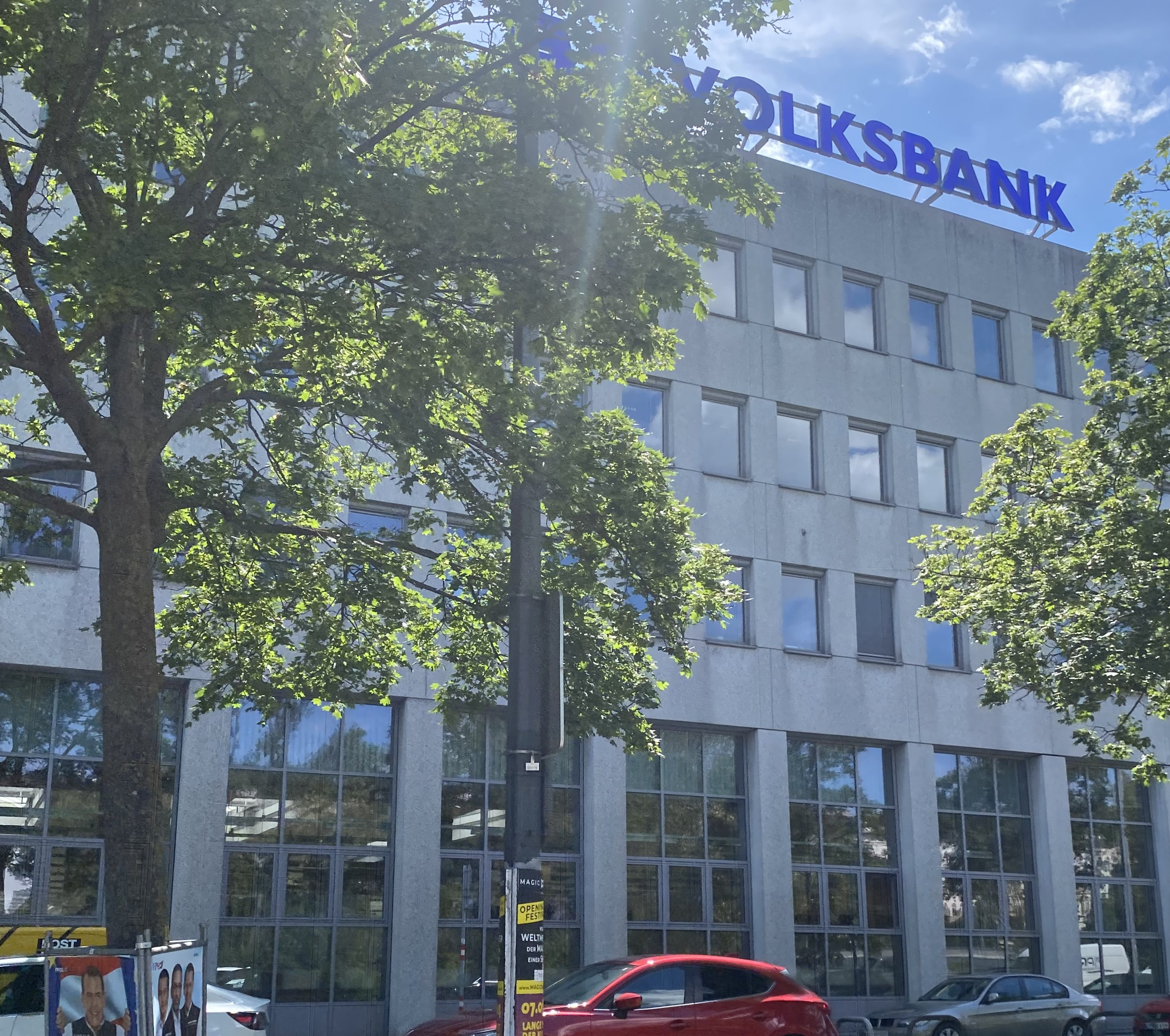
- Part of Volksbank head office complex at Dietrichgasse 25 in Vienna
- Company type: Private
- Industry: Finance and Insurance
- Founded: 1850
- Headquarters: Vienna, Austria
- Products: Financial services
- Total assets: €32,897 billion (31 December 2025)
- Number of employees: 4,400 (2015)
- Website: www.volksbank.at

The Volksbank Group (German pronunciation: [ˈfɔlksˌbaŋk ɡɹuːp], lit. 'People's Bank Group') is a cooperative banking group in Austria, whose central entity is Vienna-based Volksbank Wien AG. It includes seven other regional banks as well as a specialized bank for the health professions in Austria. The group has been designated as a Significant Institution since the entry into force of European Banking Supervision in late 2014, and as a consequence is directly supervised by the European Central Bank.

== Overview ==
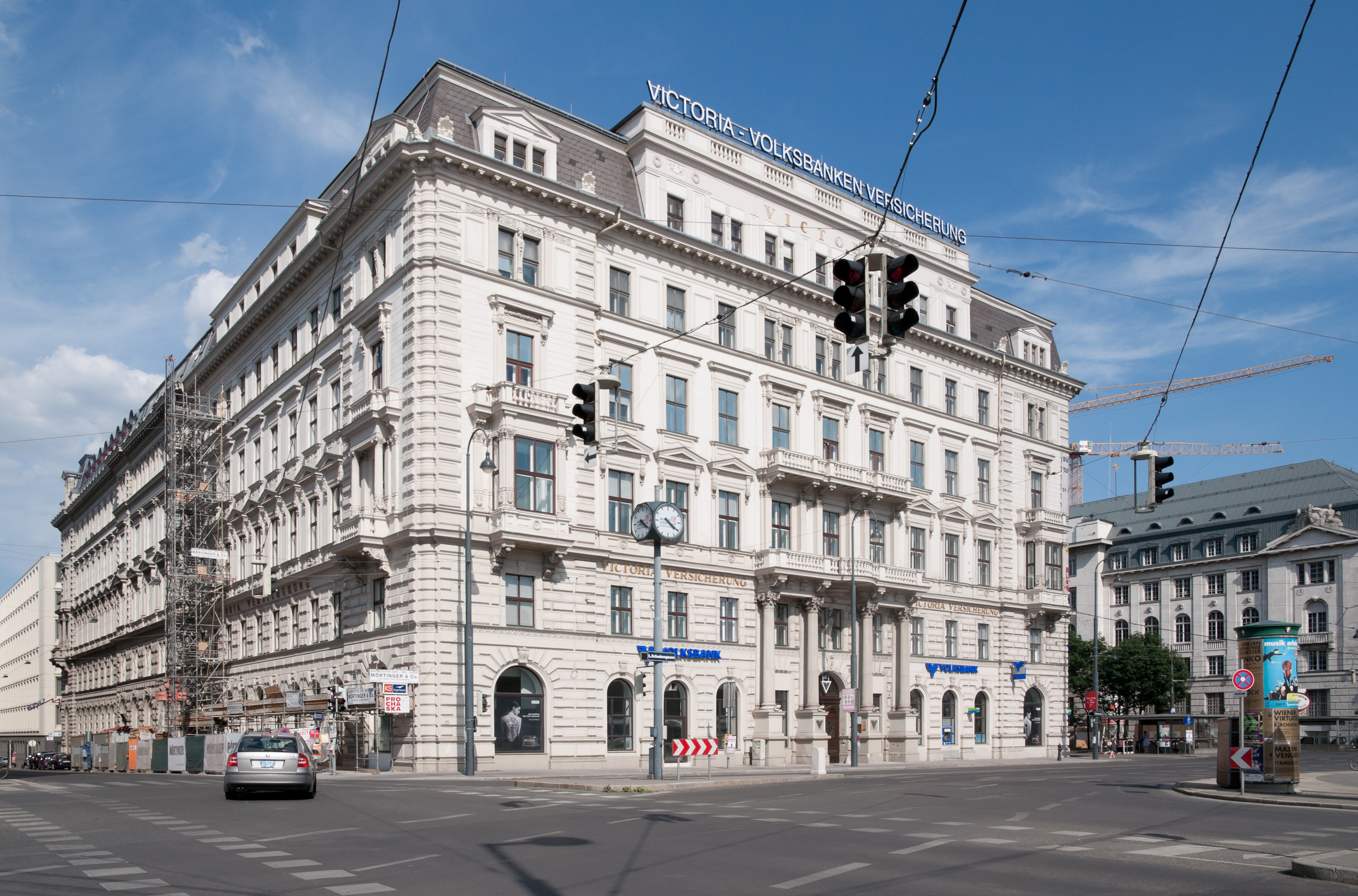
Head office of ERGO, the Volksbank Group's insurance arm, Schottengasse 10 in Vienna

There were 35 local Volksbanks in Austria by end of 2015, each of them organized as a cooperative or a corporation. By 2017 they merged to 8 regional banks and 2 specialized banks. They form an integrated system of banks (Association of Volksbanks) connected through a contract of collaboration. Volksbank Wien is the largest regional bank of the association and acts as central entity for the network.

The central service functions were transferred from ÔVAG to Volksbank Wien AG in July 2015. ÖVAG itself surrendered its banking license. The "remainder of ÖVAG" subsequently continued to operate as a wind-down entity under the name of immigon portfolioabbau ag. Immigon is responsible for ensuring the orderly, active and value-preserving wind-down of its assets.

== Association ==
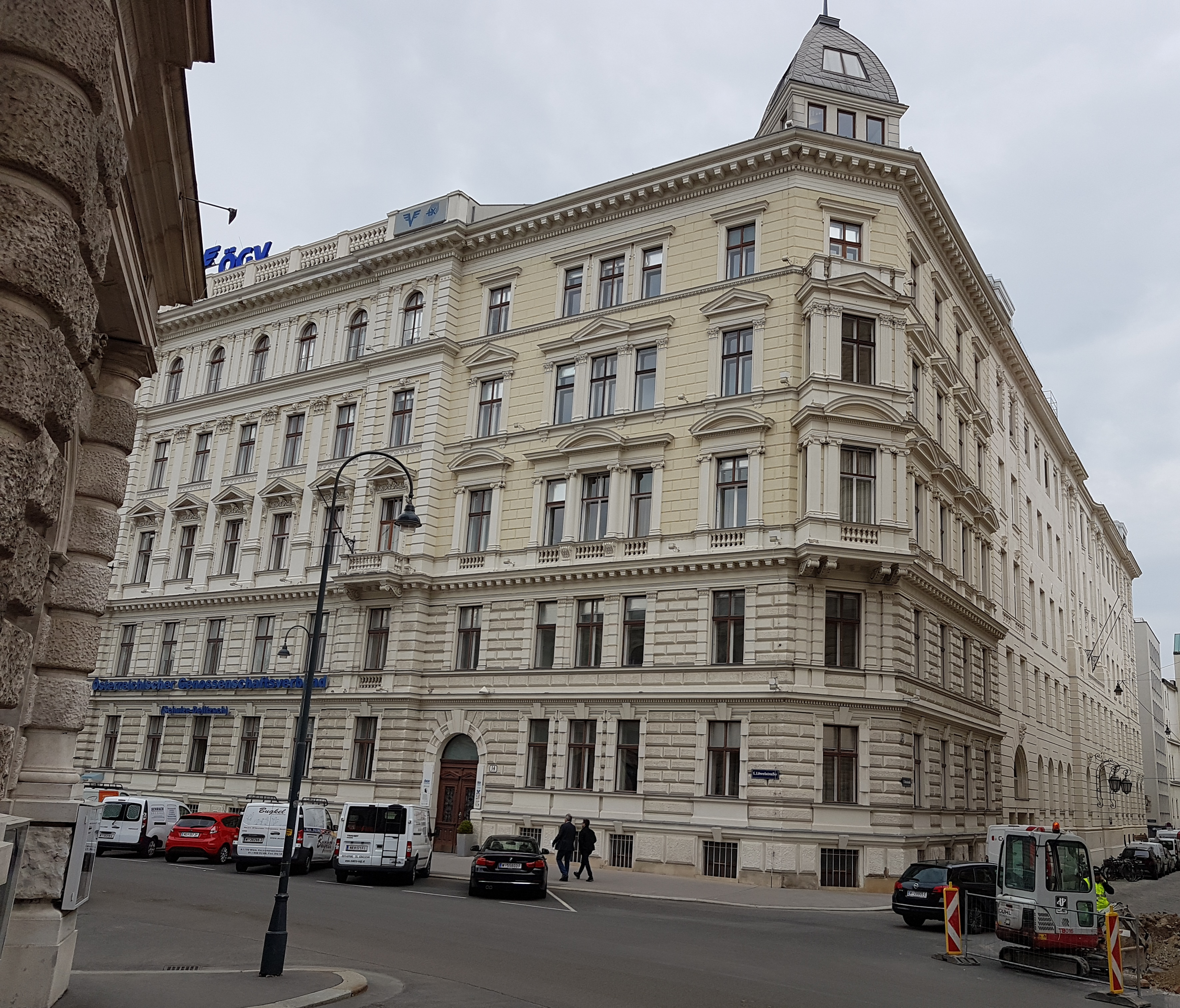
Head office of the ÖGV; Löwelstrasse 14-16 in Vienna

The representative association of the Volksbank Group members is the Österreichischer Genossenschaftsverband (ÖGV), established in 1872.

== Constituent Banks ==
- Volksbank Wien AG (Vienna)
- Volksbank Niederösterreich (Lower Austria)
- Volksbank Oberösterreich (Upper Austria)
- Volksbank Kärnten (Carinthia)
- Volksbank Salzburg (Salzburg)
- Volksbank Steiermark (Styria)
- Volksbank Tirol (Tyrol)
- Volksbank Vorarlberg (Vorarlberg)
- Österreichische Ärzte- und Apothekerbank, a specialized banks for doctors and pharmacians

== See also ==
- de Volksbank in the Netherlands
- German Cooperative Financial Group
- List of European cooperative banks
- List of banks in Austria
- List of banks in the euro area
