= Bosnia and Herzegovina convertible mark =

Currency of Bosnia and Herzegovina

Convertible mark
konvertibilna marka (Bosnian); конвертибилна марка (Serbian); konvertibilna marka (Croatian)
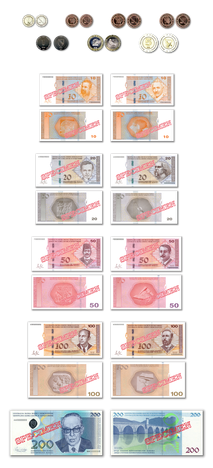
- Convertible marks coins and banknotes^{1}

ISO 4217
- Code: BAM (numeric: 977)
- Subunit: 0.01

Units of account
- Plural: The language(s) of this currency belong(s) to the Slavic languages. There is more than one way to construct plural forms.
- Symbol: KM
- Subunit
- 1/100: Fening "Fening" is the official English language name of the subunit.
- Symbol
- Fening: pf

Denominations
- Banknotes
- Freq. used: KM 10, KM 20, KM 50, KM 100
- Rarely used: KM 200
- Coins: 5, 10, 20, and 50 fenings; KM 1, KM 2, KM 5

Demographics
- Date of introduction: 22 June 1998
- User(s): Bosnia and Herzegovina

Issuance
- Central bank: Central Bank of Bosnia and Herzegovina
- Website: www.cbbh.ba
- Printer: Imprimerie Oberthur (by François-Charles Oberthür)
- Mint: Royal Mint, Llantrisant

Valuation
- Inflation: −0.9%
- Source: The World Factbook, 2014 est.
- Method: CPI
- Pegged with: Euro (€) = KM 1.95583
- ^{1} Designs for KM 10, KM 20, KM 50, and KM 100 banknotes differ for the two constituent polities, the FBiH and RS, in some aspects, including images and order of scripts. The residual KM 200 banknote and all of the coins are identical for both polities.

The convertible mark (Bosnian; sign: KM; code: BAM) is the currency of Bosnia and Herzegovina. It is divided into 100 pfenig or fening and locally abbreviated KM. While the currency and its subunits are uniform for both constituent polities of Bosnia and Herzegovina, namely the Federation of Bosnia and Herzegovina (FBiH) and Republika Srpska (RS), the designs of the KM 10, KM 20, KM 50, and KM 100 banknotes are differentiated for each polity.

== History ==
The convertible mark was established by the 1995 Dayton Agreement. It replaced the Bosnia and Herzegovina dinar, Croatian kuna and Yugoslav novi dinar as the single currency of Bosnia and Herzegovina in 1998. Mark refers to the Deutsche Mark, the currency to which it was pegged at par.

=== Etymology ===
The names derive from German. The three official languages of Bosnia and Herzegovina, Bosnian, Serbian and Croatian, have adopted the German nouns Mark and Pfennig as loanwords marka and pfenig. The Official Gazette of BiH (Bosnian: Službeni glasnik BiH), Official newspaper of FBiH (Bosnian: Službene novine FBiH) and other official documents recognised pfenig or пфениг (depending on the script; Serbian and Bosnian use both Latin and Cyrillic, while Croatian uses only Latin) as the name of the subdivision. Most, however, consider the "pf" cluster in "pfenig" to be nigh unpronounceable, so the pronunciation was practically immediately reduced to "fenig", which eventually gave rise to the "fening" misspelling. Banknotes of 50 fenings circulated from 1998 to 2003. They were denoted "50 KONVERTIBILNIH PFENIGA" / "50 КОНВЕРТИБИЛНИХ ПФЕНИГА"; technically, the word convertible should not qualify the word pfenig because only the mark is convertible. (See Errors for all of the errors on banknotes and coins.) Coins of 10, 20, and 50 pfenigs have circulated since 1998 (the 5-pfenigs coin was released in 2006). All of them are inscribed "~ feninga" / "~ фенинга" on the obverse. The misspelling fening/фенинг has never been corrected, and it took such a hold that it was officially adopted and not recognised as incorrect. Due to the overall confusion surrounding the foreign name of the currency, most people call the convertible mark simply "marka" ("mark") while pfennigs are referred to as "kovanice" ("nickels").

==== Plurals and cases ====
Serbo-Croatian is subject to a case system. For the purposes of pluralizing currency terms, three situations are relevant:

- In combination with numbers 1, 21, 31, 41, 51, 61, 71, 81, 101, 1001, et cetera (i. e. all numbers ending in "1" except 11), nouns use the nominative case singular (the base form):

màrka (màr: a – short vowel, rising tone) and pfénig/féning ((p)fé: e – short vowel, rising tone)

- In combination with numbers whose final digit is 2, 3, or 4 (except 12, 13, and 14), nouns use the genitive case singular (the "paucal form"):

màrke (màr: a – short vowel, rising tone) and pféniga/féninga ((p)fé: e – short vowel, rising tone)

- In combination with numbers 0, 5, 6, 7, 8, 9, 10, 11, 12, 13, 14, 15, 16, 17, 18, 19, 20, 100, 1000, 10000, et cetera (i. e. all numbers ending in 5, 6, 7, 8, 9, 0, 11, 12, 13, or 14), nouns use the genitive case plural:

mȁrākā (mȁr: a – short vowel, falling tone; vowels ā are not accented but have genitive length) and pfénīgā/fénīngā ((p)fé: e – short vowel, rising tone; vowels ī and ā are not accented but have genitive length)

(For further information on accents in BSC, see Serbo-Croatian phonology and Shtokavian dialect#Accentuation.)

For the pfenig, the plural is pfeniga/feninga with a short unaccented a, whereas the genitive plural is the same pfeniga/feninga but with a long unaccented i and a. A syllable after an accented syllable whose vowel is pronounced long and with a continuous tone, i. e. neither rising or falling, is said to have a genitive length (although the word does not necessarily have to be in the genitive case in order to have genitive length on its syllable; it can be in the locative also).

These matters should be noted when the local names are used in English. For example, the English plural "ten pfenigas" / "ten feningas" is incorrect because the final a in the BSC plural pfeniga/feninga already indicates the plural. Therefore "ten pfenigs" / "ten fenings" should be used. The Central Bank of Bosnia and Herzegovina (CBBH) uses "fenings" as the English plural. Likewise, "twenty-one markas", "two markes", and "twelve marakas" are incorrect; "twenty-one marks", "two marks", and "twelve marks", respectively, are correct.

== Coins ==
In December 1998, coins were introduced in denominations of 10, 20 and 50 fenings. Coins of 5 fenings, KM 1, KM 2 and KM 5 were introduced later. The coins were designed by Bosnian designer Kenan Zekić and minted at the Royal Mint in Llantrisant (Wales, UK).

Coins of the convertible mark (1998–present)
Image O R	Value	Technical parameters			Description			Date of			
Image O R	Value	Diameter	Mass	Composition	Edge	Obverse	Reverse	minting	issue	withdrawal	lapse
O R	5 fenings	18.00 mm	2.66 g	nickel-plated steel	reeded	Map of Bosnia and Herzegovina, country name, denomination	Flag of Bosnia and Herzegovina, country name, year	2005–present	5 January 2006	Current	
O R	10 fenings	20.00 mm	3.90 g	copper-plated steel	plain	Map of Bosnia and Herzegovina, country name, denomination	Flag of Bosnia and Herzegovina, country name, year	1998–present	9 December 1998	Current	
O R	20 fenings	22.00 mm	4.50 g	copper-plated steel	reeded	Map of Bosnia and Herzegovina, country name, denomination	Flag of Bosnia and Herzegovina, country name, year	1998–present	9 December 1998	Current	
O R	50 fenings	24.00 mm	5.15 g	copper-plated steel	reeded	Map of Bosnia and Herzegovina, country name, denomination	Flag of Bosnia and Herzegovina, country name, year	1998–present	9 December 1998	Current	
O R	1 mark	23.25 mm	4.95 g	nickel-plated steel	milled and smooth	Denomination, country name, indented and inverted triangles*	Coat of arms of Bosnia and Herzegovina	2000–present	31 July 2000	Current	
O R	2 marks	25.75 mm	6.90 g	cupro-nickel (inner ring); golden 5.5%; nickel-brass combination (outer ring)	milled and smooth	Denomination, country name, indented and inverted triangles*	Peace dove	2000–present	31 July 2000	Current	
O R	5 marks	30.00 mm	10.35 g	nickel-brass (inner ring); copper-nickel (outer ring)	milled	Denomination, country name, indented and inverted triangles*	Peace dove	2005–present	5 January 2006	Current	
These images are to scale at 2.5 pixels per millimetre. For table standards, see the coin specification table. *The triangles are intended for the visually impaired.

== Banknotes ==
In 1998, notes were introduced in denominations of 50 fenings, KM 1, KM 5, KM 10, KM 20, KM 50, and KM 100. KM 200 notes were added in 2002, while the 50-fening and KM 1 and KM 5 notes were later withdrawn from circulation. All current notes are valid throughout the nation.

The Central Bank of Bosnia Herzegovina issues the banknotes, with distinct designs for the constituent polities of the Federation of Bosnia and Herzegovina and the Republika Srpska,^{1} except for the largest denomination, i. e. the KM 200 note. The banknotes are legal tender throughout the country. On the notes for the Republika Srpska, inscriptions are printed first in Cyrillic and then Latin script, and vice versa. Banknotes, with the exception of the KM 200 note, are printed by the French company Oberthur.

=== Federation of Bosnia and Herzegovina issues ===
Banknotes of the convertible mark for FBiH (1998–present)
Image O R	Value	Technical parameters		Description		Date of			
Image O R	Value	Dimensions	Watermark	Obverse	Reverse	printing	issue	withdrawal	lapse
O R	50 fenings	120 mm × 60 mm	Central Bank monogram repeated vertically	Skender Kulenović	Stećak Zgošca fragment	No date (1998)	22 June 1998	1 January 2003	1 April 2018
O R	1 mark	120 mm × 60 mm	Central Bank monogram repeated vertically	Ivan Franjo Jukić	Stećak Stolac fragment	No date (1998)	22 June 1998	1 January 2009	1 April 2018
O R	5 marks	122 mm × 62 mm	Central Bank monogram repeated vertically	Meša Selimović	Trees	No date (1998)	22 June 1998	1 January 2010	1 April 2018
O R	10 marks	130 mm × 65 mm	Central Bank monogram repeated vertically	Mehmedalija Mak Dizdar	Stećak Križevići fragment (until 2017 print, wrongly named as "Stećak Radimlja", corrected in 2019 print)	No date (1998) (2008) (2012) (2017) (2019)	22 June 1998; 4 November 2008; 1 June 2012; 14 April 2017	Current	
O R	20 marks	138 mm × 68 mm	Central Bank monogram repeated vertically	Antun Branko Šimić	Stećak Radimlja fragment	No date (1998) (2008) (2012) (2019)	22 June 1998; 4 November 2008; 1 June 2012; 14 April 2017	Current	
O R	50 marks	146 mm × 71 mm	Central Bank monogram repeated vertically	Musa Ćazim Ćatić	Stone relief	No date (1998) (2002) (2007) (2008) (2009) (2012) (2017) (2019)	22 June 1998; No date (2002); 1 March 2007; No date (2008); 14 December 2009; 1 June 2012	Current	
O R	100 marks	154 mm × 74 mm	Central Bank monogram repeated vertically	Nikola Šop	Stećak Zgošca fragment	No date (1998) (2002) (2007) (2008) (2012) (2017) (2019)	27 July 1998; No date (2002); 1 March 2007; No date (2008); 1 June 2012	Current	
These images are to scale at 0.7 pixel per millimetre (18 pixel per inch). For table standards, see the banknote specification table.

=== Republika Srpska issues ===
Banknotes of the convertible mark for RS (1998–present)
Image O R	Value	Technical parameters		Description		Date of			
Image O R	Value	Dimensions	Watermark	Obverse	Reverse	printing	issue	withdrawal	lapse
O R	50 fenings	120 mm × 60 mm	Central Bank monogram repeated vertically	Branko Ćopić	House and books	No date (1998)	22 June 1998	1 January 2003	1 April 2018
O R	1 mark	120 mm × 60 mm	Central Bank monogram repeated vertically	Ivo Andrić	The Bridge on the Drina	No date (1998)	22 June 1998	15 July 1998^{[a]}	1 April 2018
O R	^{[b]}5 marks	122 mm × 62 mm	Central Bank monogram repeated vertically	Meša Selimović	Trees	No date (1998)	22 June 1998	1 January 2010	1 April 2018
O R	10 marks	130 mm × 65 mm	Central Bank monogram repeated vertically	Aleksa Šantić	Loaf of bread	No date (1998) (2008) (2012) (2017) (2019)	22 June 1998; 4 November 2008; 1 June 2012	Current	
O R	20 marks	138 mm × 68 mm	Central Bank monogram repeated vertically	Filip Višnjić	Gusle (musical instrument)	No date (1998) (2008) (2012) (2019)	22 June 1998; 4 November 2008; 1 June 2012	Current	
O R	50 marks	146 mm × 71 mm	Central Bank monogram repeated vertically	Jovan Dučić	pen, eyeglasses and book	No date (1998) (2002) (2007) (2008) (2009) (2012) (2017) (2019)	22 June 1998; No date (2002); 1 March 2007; No date (2008); 14 December 2009; 1 June 2012	Current	
O R	100 marks	154 mm × 74 mm	Central Bank monogram repeated vertically	Petar Kočić	pen, eyeglasses and book	No date (1998) (2002) (2007) (2008) (2012) (2017) (2019)	27 July 1998; No date (2002); 1 March 2007; No date (2008); 1 June 2012	Current	
These images are to scale at 0.7 pixel per millimetre (18 pixel per inch). For table standards, see the banknote specification table.

=== Nationwide issues ===
The portraits of Ivan Franjo Jukić and Meša Selimović, which are both writers, were featured by consensus between both entities on all KM 1 and KM 5 notes used between 1998 and 2010.

On 15 May 2002, a KM 200 banknote, designed by Robert Kalina, was introduced during a promotion that was held in the Central Bank of BH. The reverse design which depicts a bridge is meant to resemble the euro banknotes, which were also designed by Robert Kalina. After an international tender, the Austrian company Oesterreichische Banknoten und Sicherheitsdruck GmbH (OeBS) in Vienna was chosen to print the notes. Initially, six million were ordered.

Banknotes of the convertible mark for both entities (2002–present)
Image O R	Value	Technical parameters		Description		Date of			
Image O R	Value	Dimensions	Watermark	Obverse	Reverse	printing	issue	withdrawal	lapse
O R	200 marks	156 mm × 76 mm	Image of the Bridge on River Drina	Ivo Andrić	The Bridge on the Drina	No date (2002); 17 August 2022	15 May 2002	Current	
These images are to scale at 0.7 pixel per millimetre (18 pixel per inch). For table standards, see the banknote specification table.

== Exchange rates ==
Initially the mark was pegged to the Deutsche Mark at par. Since the replacement of the German mark by the euro in 2002, the Bosnian convertible mark uses the same fixed exchange rate to euro that the German mark had (that is, 1 EUR = 1.95583 BAM).

Current BAM exchange rates
From Google Finance:	AUD CAD CHF CNY EUR GBP HKD JPY USD TRY
From Yahoo! Finance:	AUD CAD CHF CNY EUR GBP HKD JPY USD TRY
From XE.com:	AUD CAD CHF CNY EUR GBP HKD JPY USD TRY
From OANDA:	AUD CAD CHF CNY EUR GBP HKD JPY USD TRY

== Errors ==
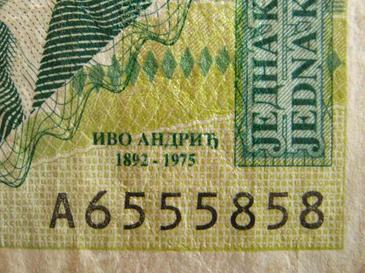
Detail on KM 1 banknote for Republika Srpska with misspelled name of Ivo Andrić written in Cyrillic as "ИВО АНДРИЂ / IVO ANDRIĐ" instead of "ИВО АНДРИЋ / IVO ANDRIĆ"

Banknotes and coins of Bosnia and Herzegovina have many mistakes and inconsistencies.

Officially, only one banknote has not been released in circulation because of a mistake, even though other banknotes with mistakes had been issued.

=== Banknote examples ===
These are the most important mistakes that have been noticed to date:

- Both designs of the 50 fening banknote imprinted the adjective "convertible" next to the noun "pfenig", although only the mark has the "convertible" prefix ("50 KONVERTIBILNIH PFENIGA" / "50 КОНВЕРТИБИЛНИХ ПФЕНИГА").
- The KM 1 banknote for Republika Srpska was imprinted "ИВО АНДРИЂ / IVO ANDRIĐ" instead of "ИВО АНДРИЋ / IVO ANDRIĆ". This banknote was immediately removed from circulation.^{[a]}
- Both designs of the KM 5 banknote had the Cyrillic word "five" incorrectly printed in Latin script on its reverse ("PET КОНВЕРТИБИЛНИХ МАРАКА", instead of "ПЕТ ..."). Also, Meša Selimović's name is written in Cyrillic as "Меща Селимовић" instead of "Meша Селимовић" (the letter щ is not even used in any of the official languages of Bosnia and Herzegovina).
- The KM 10 banknote for Republika Srpska, first series, 1998, had Aleksa Šantić's name printed in Latin script although it should have been printed in Cyrillic script as it is on all other examples of the 1998 series.
- Both designs of the KM 100 banknote, first series, 1998, were incorrectly printed with the Cyrillic abbreviation of the Central Bank of Bosnia and Herzegovina with "Џ / Dž" instead of "Ц / C" (i. e. "ЏББХ / DžBBH" instead of "ЦББХ / CBBH") in the safety bar.
- In 2017, Edin Bujak of the Department of Archaeology of the Faculty of Philosophy in Sarajevo noticed a mistake on the KM 10 banknote for the Federation of B&H. The picture of the stećak on the reverse is actually a picture of a stećak from Križevići, Olovo and not from the Radimlja necropolis as stated on the banknote. The Central Bank of Bosnia and Herzegovina confirmed this mistake, and it will be corrected in future printing of the banknote.

=== Coin examples ===
- The name of the subdivision of the convertible mark has been incorrectly engraved on coins: the word "pfenig" has been engraved as "fening". This mistake has taken such a hold, especially because there were and are no 50 pfenig/fening banknotes in circulation, that "fening" was officially adopted as the name of the hundredth unit of the KM and is not recognized as incorrect.

== See also ==
- Currencies related to the euro
- Economy of Bosnia and Herzegovina

== Notes ==
1. This Republika Srpska issue of KM 1 was immediately removed from circulation because of a typo. Instead of "Иво Андрић" it was written "Иво Андриђ". The decision not to release into the circulation the banknote in denominations of 1 convertible mark was published in Official Gazette of BiH (No 13/98).
2. This Republika Srpska issue of KM 5 is same as the one for FBiH but for RS issue denominations are written in Cyrillic script first and then in Latin (for FBiH issue vice versa).
