= Sarajevo Stock Exchange =

- Sarajevska berza
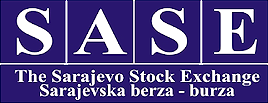
- Type: Stock exchange
- Location: Sarajevo, Bosnia and Herzegovina
- Founded: 13 September 2001; 23 years ago
- Key people: Tahir Taslaman (Director)
- Currency: Convertible mark (BAM)
- No. of listings: 327 (as of April 2019)
- Market cap: BAM 5.36 billion (April 2019); US$ 3.34 billion
- Volume: BAM 541.031 million (2020)
- Indices: BIFX; SASX-10; SASX-30; SASX-BBI; SASX-FN
- Website: www.sase.ba

The Sarajevo Stock Exchange or SASE (Bosnian: Sarajevska berza) is a stock exchange which operates in Sarajevo, Bosnia and Herzegovina.

== History and structure ==
The Sarajevo Stock Exchange (SASE) was founded on 13 September 2001 and commenced trading on 12 April 2002, as a central marketplace for trading in securities in the Federation of Bosnia and Herzegovina, which together with Republika Srpska, makes up the post-war Bosnia and Herzegovina. The SASE was founded as a joint-stock company. It had eight founding members. According to the Securities Law, SASE members can only be legal entities - brokerage houses whose sole activity is trading in securities, with headquarters in Bosnia and Herzegovina. The founding capital of the exchange was BAM 200.000 (1 BAM = 0.51 €).

All SASE members must be licensed for securities trading by the Securities Commission of the Federation of Bosnia and Herzegovina. Only those brokers authorized by the SASE members, who have passed a brokers' exam are allowed to trade. The Securities Commission defines the manner and conditions for taking the exam and for revoking the licence. A broker is required to hold a valid licence issued by the Agency. The SASE currently has 16 members, whose headquarters are spread around Bosnia and Herzegovina, the majority being in the country's capital, Sarajevo. The shareholder assembly elects a five-member supervisory board for a four-year term. The supervisory board appoints the Manager of the Exchange who is in charge of the strategic planning and daily operations.

The members of the management board of the Sarajevo Stock Exchange and Wiener Börse (Vienna Stock Exchange) signed a memorandum of understanding on 21 March 2006. This made Bosnia and Herzegovina – after Romania, Croatia and Serbia – the fourth Southeast European stock exchange to enter into a cooperation agreement with the Budapest Stock Exchange and the Wiener Börse. The memorandum of understanding lays the foundation for closer collaboration between the exchanges of Sarajevo and Vienna. The first joint project was an index.

== Performance ==
The performance of the Sarajevo Stock Exchange exploded in the first few years. From 2002, market capitalization rose by around twenty times and, at the end of 2005, it was €3.3 billion. The average daily trading volumes also soared in the first few years and hit €1.5 million by 2005. The leading index of the Sarajevo Stock Exchange, the BIFX, rose from 1,264.20 at the end of 2002 to 4,045.57 points at the end of 2005.

In April 2019, market capitalization was BAM 5.36 billion, while the average daily trading volumes in 2020 were at BAM 541.031 million.

== See also ==
- List of European stock exchanges
- Banja Luka Stock Exchange
