= Nova Banka (Republika Srpska) =

Bank

Nova Banka AD Banja Luka
- Trade name: Nova Banka
- Type: Private (akcionarsko društvo)
- Traded as: BLSE: NOVB-R-E (until 24 September 2021)
- Industry: Financial services
- Founded: 1999
- Headquarters: Banja Luka, Republika Srpska, Bosnia and Herzegovina
- Area served: Republika Srpska
- Key people: Goran Radanović (Chairman of the Supervisory Board); Siniša Adžić (President of the Management Board); Nikolina Erak (Secretary)
- Parent: MG Mind (since 2023)
- Website: www.novabanka.com

Nova Banka AD Banja Luka, or simply Nova Banka, is a bank serving Republika Srpska, an entity of Bosnia and Herzegovina, seated in Banja Luka. It was founded in 1999, and as of 2022 was the third-largest bank in the country by assets (and the largest by assets in Republika Srpska), as well as the largest domestically owned bank in the country.

== See also ==
- List of banks in Bosnia and Herzegovina
