= Banking Agency of the Federation of Bosnia and Herzegovina =

- Agencija za bankarstvo Federacije Bosne i Hercegovine

Agency overview
- Formed: September 1, 1996; 29 years ago
- Jurisdiction: Federation of Bosnia and Herzegovina
- Headquarters: Sarajevo, Bosnia and Herzegovina; 43.859204°N 18.420148°E
- Agency executive: Jasmin Mahmuzić, Director
- Website: www.fba.ba

The Banking Agency of the Federation of Bosnia and Herzegovina is a state agency of the Federation of Bosnia and Herzegovina, an entity of Bosnia and Herzegovina, responsible for bank regulations.

The Agency has given its full contribution to the banking sector reform as an independent, sovereign and non-profit authority for bank supervision and licensing. Its work is directed towards strong and stable banking, microcredit and leasing system, and is market-oriented and based on the international standards of performance and supervision of banks, microcredit organizations and leasing companies.

== See also ==
- Bosnia and Herzegovina convertible mark
- Economy of Bosnia and Herzegovina
- Central Bank of Bosnia and Herzegovina
- Banking Agency of Republika Srpska
