= Banking Agency of Republika Srpska =

Federal banking regulator of Republika Srpska entity of BiH

The Banking Agency of Republika Srpska is the main bank regulator of the Republika Srpska entity of Bosnia and Herzegovina. Its function is parallel to that of the Banking Agency of the Federation of Bosnia and Herzegovina. Unlike some other areas of the government in BiH, BARS and the FBA are in close cooperation on matters regarding economic oversight. The agency is established as the national regulating body pursuant to Articles 4 and 5 of the Law on Banking Agency of Republika Srpska. The agency also monitors for money laundering and fraud. It is accountable to the Government of Republika Srpska.
