= Central Bank of Bosnia and Herzegovina =

State-owned bank in Bosnia and Herzegovina

Central Bank of Bosnia and Herzegovina Centralna banka Bosne i Hercegovine Централна банка Босне и Херцеговине
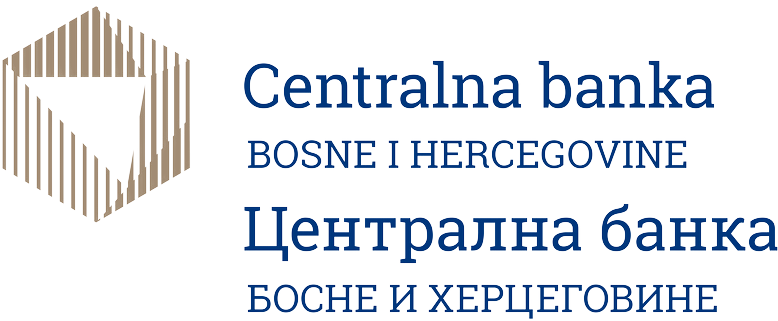

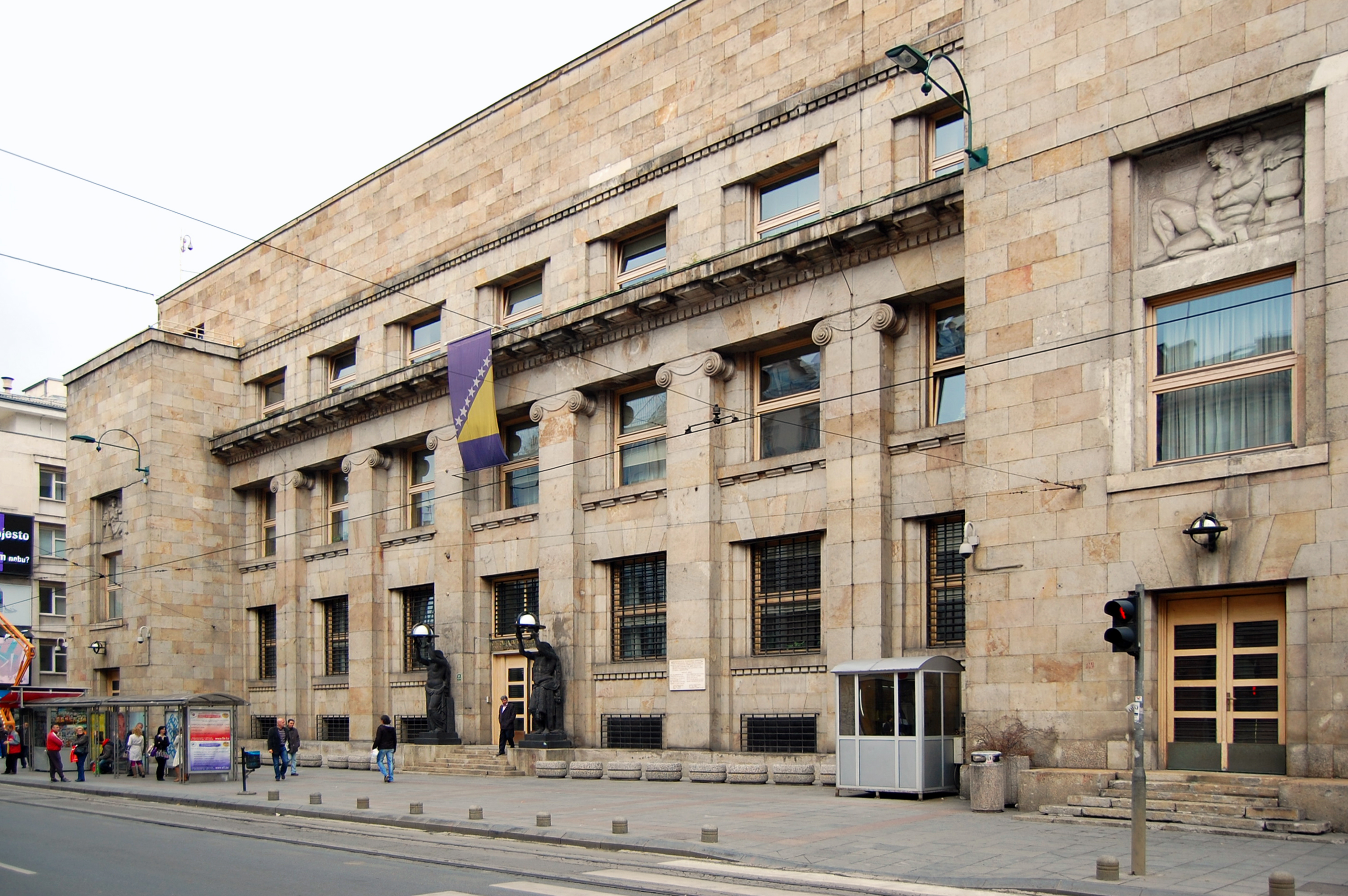
- Central bank of: Bosnia and Herzegovina
- Headquarters: Ulica Maršala Tita 25, Sarajevo
- Coordinates: 43.8588°N 18.4206°E
- Established: 20 June 1997; 29 years ago
- Ownership: 100% state ownership
- Governor: Jasmina Selimović
- Currency: Bosnia and Herzegovina convertible mark BAM (ISO 4217)
- Reserves: $17.4 billion USD
- Website: www.cbbh.ba

The Central Bank of Bosnia and Herzegovina (Bosnian, Croatian and Serbian: Centralna banka Bosne i Hercegovine / Централна банка Босне и Херцеговине) is the central bank of Bosnia and Herzegovina, located in the capital city, Sarajevo.

== History ==
Office building of the Central Bank of Bosnia and Herzegovina in Banja Luka

The National Bank of Bosnia and Herzegovina (NBBH) was originally established in 1971 as part of the System of National Banks which replaced the National Bank of Yugoslavia (NBJ) as Yugoslavia's collective monetary authority. Upon Bosnian independence in March 1992, the NBBH became the national central bank of the newly independent, but the Bosnian War soon resulted in the creation of a separate National Bank of the Republika Srpska (NBRS) in the Republika Srpska, and of a monetary system under the Ministry of Finance of the Croatian Republic of Herzeg-Bosnia.

Following the Dayton Agreement and end of the Bosnian War, The Central Bank of Bosnia and Herzegovina was established in accordance with the Law adopted at the Parliamentary Assembly of Bosnia and Herzegovina on 20 June 1997, and started operations on 11 August 1997. It incorporated the former operations of both the NBBH and NBRS; the NBBH was subsequently liquidated.

== Operations ==
The Central Bank of Bosnia and Herzegovina maintains monetary stability by issuing domestic currency according to the currency board arrangement with full coverage in freely convertible foreign exchange funds under the fixed exchange rate (1 BAM: 0.51129 EUR). The Central Bank of Bosnia and Herzegovina defines and controls the implementation of monetary policy of Bosnia and Herzegovina. The Central Bank of Bosnia and Herzegovina supports and maintains appropriate payment and settlement systems. It also co-ordinates the activities of the BH Entity Banking Agencies, which are in charge of bank licensing and supervision.

The Central Bank of Bosnia and Herzegovina has the head office, three main units and two branches. The main units are the Main Unit Sarajevo, the Main Bank of Republika Srpska CBBH Banja Luka and Main Unit Mostar. The branches are: the CBBH Branch in Brčko and the Main Bank of Republika Srpska CBBH Branch in Pale.

The senior body of the Central Bank of Bosnia and Herzegovina is the governing board, which is in charge of establishing and supervision of monetary policy, organization and strategies of the Central Bank, all according to the powers given to the board by the law. According to the law on CBBH, the governing board consists of five persons that are appointed by the BH presidency for a six-year mandate. The governing board appoints one of its members as governor.

The management of the Central Bank of Bosnia and Herzegovina consists of a governor and three vice governors, appointed by the governor with the approval of the governing board. The task of the management is the operative management of the Central Bank business. Each vice governor is directly responsible for the operations of one sector of the Central Bank.

== Head office building ==
The Central Bank's head office building was originally completed in 1931 for the Sarajevo branch of the State Mortgage Bank of Yugoslavia. The architect was the Serbian and Yugoslav architect Milan Zloković. The set designer of the National Theatre in Belgrade, Vladimir Pavlovich Zagorodnjuk, created eight reliefs for the front and side facades, as well as two monumental bronze figures of a man and a woman placed at the main entrance.

== Governors ==
The following have been Governors of the Central Bank of Bosnia and Herzegovina:

1. Peter Nicholl (20 June 1997 – 31 December 2004)
2. Kemal Kozarić (1 January 2005 – 11 August 2015)
3. Senad Softić (11 August 2015 – 3 January 2024)
4. Jasmina Selimović (3 January 2024 – present)

== See also ==
- Bosnia and Herzegovina convertible mark
- Economy of Bosnia and Herzegovina
- Economy of Europe
- List of central banks
- List of financial supervisory authorities by country
