= Kamengrad =

Kamengrad may refer to:

- Kamengrad Fort, a medieval ruin near Sanski Most, Bosnia and Herzegovina
- Donji Kamengrad, a village near Sanski Most, Bosnia and Herzegovina
- Gornji Kamengrad, a village near Sanski Most, Bosnia and Herzegovina
- Kamengrad coal mine, a coal mine in Bosnia and Herzegovina
- Andrićgrad, a construction project in Višegrad, Bosnia and Herzegovina
