= Kakanj mine disaster =

Kakanj Mine disaster may refer to:

- 1934 Kakanj mine disaster that killed 127 miners,
- 1965 Kakanj mine disaster that killed 128 miners.
