= Bugojno coal mine =

Coal mine in Bosnia and Herzegovina

Bugojno Coal Mine
- Location within Bosnia and Herzegovina
- Location: Central Bosnia Canton, Bosnia and Herzegovina; 44°03′25″N 17°27′02″E
- Products: Lignite
- Production: 56,711 tonnes of coal (2024)
- Company: Elektroprivreda Bosne i Hercegovine

The Bugojno Coal Mine or Gračanica Coal Mine is a brown coal mine with headquarter in Bugojno in Central Bosnia Canton. It is owned and operated by Elektroprivreda Bosne i Hercegovine.

The open pit mine in village Gračanica has coal reserves amounting to 1.29 billion tonnes of lignite. The mine has an annual production generation of 56,711 tonnes of coal (as of 2024). Its coal is mainly used for the electricity generation at Kakanj Thermal Power Plant.
