= Han Bila =

Han-Bila
- Village
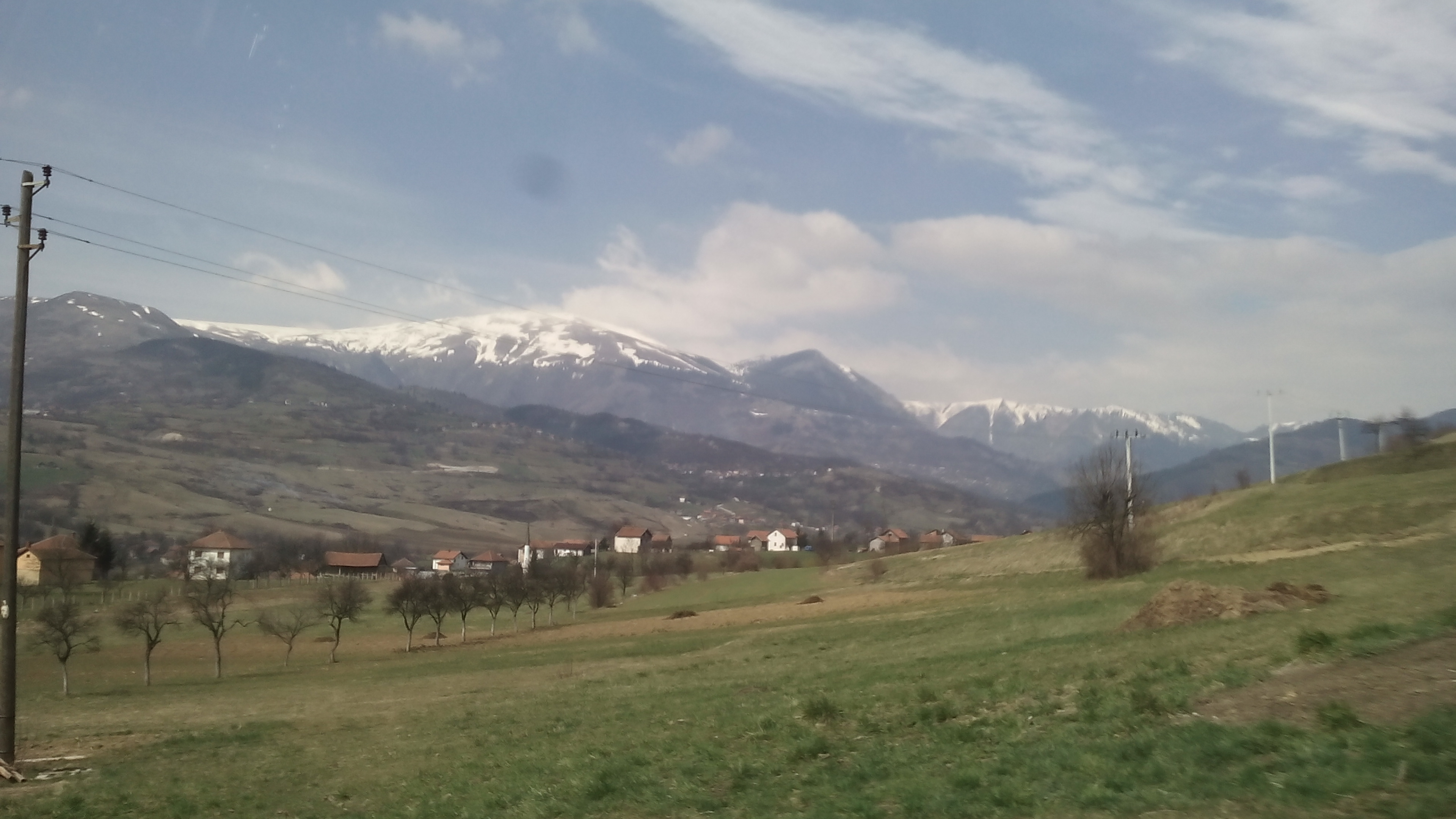
- View on the village, March 2015

- Location within Bosnia and Herzegovina
- Coordinates: 44.2391361°N 17.7497353°E
- Country: Bosnia and Herzegovina
- Entity: Federation of Bosnia and Herzegovina
- Canton: Central Bosnia
- Municipality: Travnik

Area
  - Total: 0.89 km^{2} (0.34 sq mi)

Population (2013)
  - Total: 655
  - Density: 740/km^{2} (1,900/sq mi)
- Time zone: UTC+1 (CET)
  - Summer (DST): UTC+2 (CEST)

Han-Bila is a village in the municipality of Travnik, Bosnia and Herzegovina. The words "Han-Bila" mean "Hotel on Bila", Bila being the river that flows through the town. The word "Han" translates to "Motel" or "Inn". Abdulvehab Ilhamija, a famous Bosnian historical figure and poet, stayed in this village to rest before going to Travnik where he was executed. There is no accurate information on when the village was formed, but there is evidence that it has been populated for a long time. On the east side of the village, across the river, old stone tombs have been found with bones inside. The bones have been taken to Travnik to a museum. Until after The Second World War, the village was sparsely populated and used for its good agricultural potential. After the Second World War, the coal mining became the primary source for jobs in the area, and coal became its most valued resource.

The village is mostly flat and surrounded by hills and the mountain Vlašić. It has great agricultural potential since it is flat and has a river for irrigation.

== Demographics ==
According to the 2013 census, its population was 655.

Ethnicity in 2013
Ethnicity	Number	Percentage
Bosniaks	631	96.3%
Croats	4	0.6%
other/undeclared	20	3.1%
Total	655	100%

== Mine ==
The coal mine Rudnik mrkog uglja "Abid Lolić" Bila, which is owned and operated by Elektroprivreda Bosne i Hercegovine, is situated 2.1 kilometres to the south of the village.

After the Yugoslav Wars and privatization of Bosnian industry, the coal mine has been slowly losing workers, worsening in terms of workers rights and worsening in terms of safety despite the fact that a lot of coal is still being discovered.

As of 2024, the mine had an annual production output of 47,774 tonnes of coal. The most of its coal is used for the electricity generation at the Kakanj Thermal Power Plant.
