= Zenica coal mine =

Closed coal mine in Bosnia and Herzegovina

Zenica Coal Mine
- Location within Bosnia and Herzegovina
- Location: Raspotočje, Zenica-Doboj Canton, Bosnia and Herzegovina; 44°11′12″N 17°55′49″E
- Products: Lignite
- Production: 18,583 tonnes of coal (2024)
- Opened: 1882
- Closed: 2026
- Company: Elektroprivreda Bosne i Hercegovine

The Zenica Coal Mine is a brown coal mine that is in the closing procedure (as of February 2026). It is located in Zenica, Zenica-Doboj Canton. It is owned and operated by Elektroprivreda Bosne i Hercegovine.

The mine has coal reserves amounting to 961 million tonnes of lignite, one of the largest coal reserves in Europe and the world. The mine had an annual production generation of 18,583 tonnes of coal (as of 2024). Its coal was mainly used for the electricity generation at Kakanj Thermal Power Plant.

== History ==
As of 2024, the mine is the focus of a World Bank-supported pilot project for closure. Workers have faced months of unpaid wages and unpaid health and pension contributions dating back to 2010. In February 2026, after 144 years of operating, the mine officially went into the closing procedure.
