= Rudstroj =

Former Bosnian manufacturer of mining equipment

- Native name: Privredno društvo „Rudstroj“ d.d. Kakanj
- Type: Joint-stock company (dioničko društvo)
- Industry: Mining equipment, steel structures
- Fate: Bankruptcy (opened 2017); premises demolished from 2026
- Headquarters: Rudarska 8, Kakanj, Bosnia and Herzegovina
- Number of employees: c. 130 (2016)

Rudstroj (officially Privredno društvo „Rudstroj“ d.d. Kakanj) was a manufacturer of equipment for mining and heavy industry based in Kakanj, Bosnia and Herzegovina. For several decades it produced equipment for the mining, process, energy and metallurgical industries. It was part of the Kakanj coal mine (Rudnik mrkog uglja Kakanj, RMU Kakanj) until 1993, when it was separated as an independent company, and it was privatized in 2002.

During the Bosnian War the factory carried out dedicated wartime production, examples of which are held by the municipal museum in Kakanj. After more than a decade of unpaid wages, strikes and tax arrears, the company entered bankruptcy in January 2017, and its property was repeatedly offered for sale over the following years. Demolition of its former premises in 2026.

== History ==
=== Separation from RMU Kakanj ===
Rudstroj operated within RMU Kakanj until 1993, when it was separated from the mine and organized as an independent enterprise.

=== Bosnian War ===
During the 1992–1995 war Rudstroj was used for dedicated wartime production (namjenska ratna proizvodnja). Items made at the factory form part of the War Years Collection of the Kakanj municipal museum, run by the public institution JU KSC Kakanj, and were given particular attention in the museum's catalogue Kakanj u odbrambeno-oslobodilačkom ratu 1992–1995 ("Kakanj in the Defensive-Liberation War 1992–1995").

=== Privatization ===
Rudstroj was privatized in 2002. Employees bought 51 percent of the shares and the remaining 49 percent were sold through public share subscription. The registered share capital was 3,338,160 convertible marks (KM). Ownership later became more concentrated: by 2016 the six largest shareholders and one fund held about 62 percent, while some 100 small shareholders held about 30 percent. In 2014 the premier of Zenica-Doboj Canton, Munib Husejnagić, described privatization by share subscription as the worst possible method and said it limited what the cantonal government could do for the company.

=== Financial decline ===
According to the company's trade union, Rudstroj stopped paying taxes and social contributions in 2004; the union blamed mismanagement and said the problems came to a head during and after a contract to build a transshipment system at the Vrtlište open-pit mine.

On 19 February 2014 workers went on strike over ten months of overdue wages. Union representatives met the cantonal premier and ministers, telling them the company's difficulties had lasted twenty years, since its separation from RMU Kakanj, and that unpaid pension and health contributions left workers unable to retire or obtain medical care. Director Marko Drinovac told the meeting that three potential investors were interested in the company. The workers agreed to return to work while management sought funds for a further month's wages. New management installed on 25 July 2014 reached an agreement with the union on paying the minimum wage, retired 14 workers and settled service records for 2004 and 2010.

In August 2016 Rudstroj's roughly 130 workers struck again and production stopped in all plants. The company's accounts had been blocked by the tax administration over about 4.5 million KM owed to public funds, and workers were owed close to 20 months' wages. Total debts including interest were put at about 8.5 million KM, against assets appraised by court experts in November 2013 at about 10.7 million KM. The union proposed several rescue options to the Federal Ministry of Energy, Mining and Industry, including a long-term loan, making Rudstroj a subsidiary of the state power utility Elektroprivreda BiH, a controlled bankruptcy without halting production, or sale to a strategic partner. A proposal for pre-bankruptcy proceedings was then before the Municipal Court in Zenica.

== Bankruptcy ==
The Municipal Court in Zenica opened bankruptcy proceedings against Rudstroj on 17 January 2017 (case 43 0 St 139969 16 St) and appointed Hazim Škapur as trustee. The creditors' assembly authorized the sale of the company's property on 20 April 2017.

The assets proved difficult to sell. In December 2020 the trustee issued the twenty-fifth public call for bids, with no starting price. The property offered included a machining (tokarija) hall of 1,163 m², a metalworking (bravarija) hall of 1,447 m², further production buildings and land, and machinery including an overhead crane and two Swiss-made laser cutting machines. The real estate and most of the equipment were encumbered by mortgages and liens in favour of several creditors.

== Demolition of the premises ==
By 2026 the former Rudstroj building on Rudarska Street was in the possession of a private company and was being demolished. On 7 May 2026 the partial collapse of the structure damaged a lightning rod on its roof that contained radioactive material. Inspectors from the State Regulatory Agency for Radiation and Nuclear Safety halted the works until the rod could be safely removed, and the municipal inspector ordered the owner to obtain a demolition permit. Civil protection authorities said radiation was detectable only immediately next to the building, so no evacuation was needed, and that the site would be placed under surveillance and marked with radiation warning signs.
