= 1934 Kakanj mine disaster =

Coordinates: 44.145°N 18.091°E

The 1934 Kakanj mine disaster was a mining accident on 21 April 1934 at a Kakanj coal mine in Kakanj, Kingdom of Yugoslavia. The accident occurred in the "Stara jama" shaft when an explosion killed 127 of 128 miners working on the third (lowest) level.

== Background ==
The "Stara jama" shaft was opened in 1900 as the first modern coal mining shaft in Bosnia.

This was not the first, nor the last large-scale accident in the Kakanj coal mine. In 1916, 19 miners were killed in the same "Stara jama" shaft, and in 1965, 128 miners were killed in an explosion in the "Orasi" shaft.

== Disaster ==
The explosion happened around 1:30 PM on 21 April 1934. At the moment of explosion a total of 200 have been working in the shaft. Some of them managed to escape outside of the shaft, but the rest were trapped and killed by the methane gas.

== See also ==
- 1965 Kakanj mine disaster
- Dobrnja-Jug mine disaster
