= Kamengrad Fort =

Coordinates: 44°46′43.0″N 16°33′47.0″E

Kamengrad Fortress
- Donji Kamengrad, Bosnia and Herzegovina
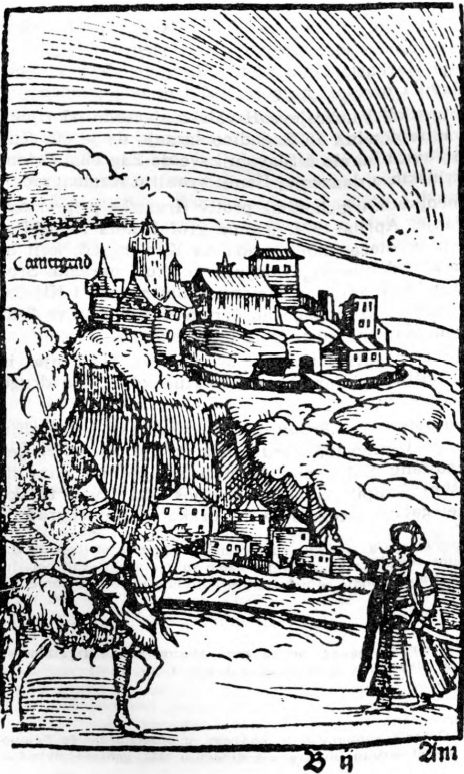
- Fortress in Kamengrad, Sanski Most, Bosnia in Herzegovina in 14th century

The Kamengrad Fort is a medieval ruin located on a plateau above the settlement of Donji Kamengrad, Bosnia and Herzegovina.

== Geography ==
The remnants of the Kamengrad fort are located above the river Bliha, alongside the communicational line Sanski Most - Bosanska Krupa - Bihać - Prijedor. The foundation of the fort is triangular, narrowing down on the eastern side. It was frequently renovated.

== History ==
The fort is first mentioned in historical documents in 1374. It belonged to the Diocese of Sana, and it was the property of the Blagajski nobles. The Musalla at Kamengrad devoted to Sultan Fatih Mehmed was built in 1463, but the fort actually changed hands only in 1498. Kamengrad fort was an important military stronghold in the Ottoman Empire. When Ottoman troops conquered Bihaćka Krajina, the importance of Kamengrad fort was reduced. Early looks of Kamegrad have been saved on a gravure found in itinerary of Benedikt Kuripešić in 1530.

The commission for the preservation of national monuments of Bosnia and Herzegovina has declared Kamengrad Fort a national monument of Bosnia and Herzegovina.
