= Kakanj coal mine =

Coal mine in Bosnia and Herzegovina

Kakanj Coal Mine
- Location within Bosnia and Herzegovina
- Location: Kakanj, Kakanj municipality, Zenica-Doboj Canton, Federation of Bosnia and Herzegovina, 72240, Bosnia and Herzegovina; 44°08′40″N 18°05′32″E
- Products: Lignite
- Production: 673,269 tonnes of coal (2024)
- Company: Elektroprivreda Bosne i Hercegovine

The Kakanj Coal Mine is a coal mine located in the Zenica-Doboj Canton. It is owned and operated by Elektroprivreda Bosne i Hercegovine.

The mine has coal reserves amounting to 440 million tonnes of lignite, one of the largest coal reserves in Europe and the world. The mine has an annual production generation of 673,269 tonnes of coal (as of 2024). Its coal is mainly used for the electricity generation at Kakanj Thermal Power Plant.

The town was also home to Rudstroj, a manufacturer of mining and industrial equipment that was part of the Kakanj brown-coal mine until 1993; it was privatized in 2002 and entered bankruptcy in 2017.

== See also ==
- 1934 Kakanj mine disaster
- 1965 Kakanj mine disaster
