= Breza coal mine =

Coal mine in Bosnia and Herzegovina

Breza Coal Mine
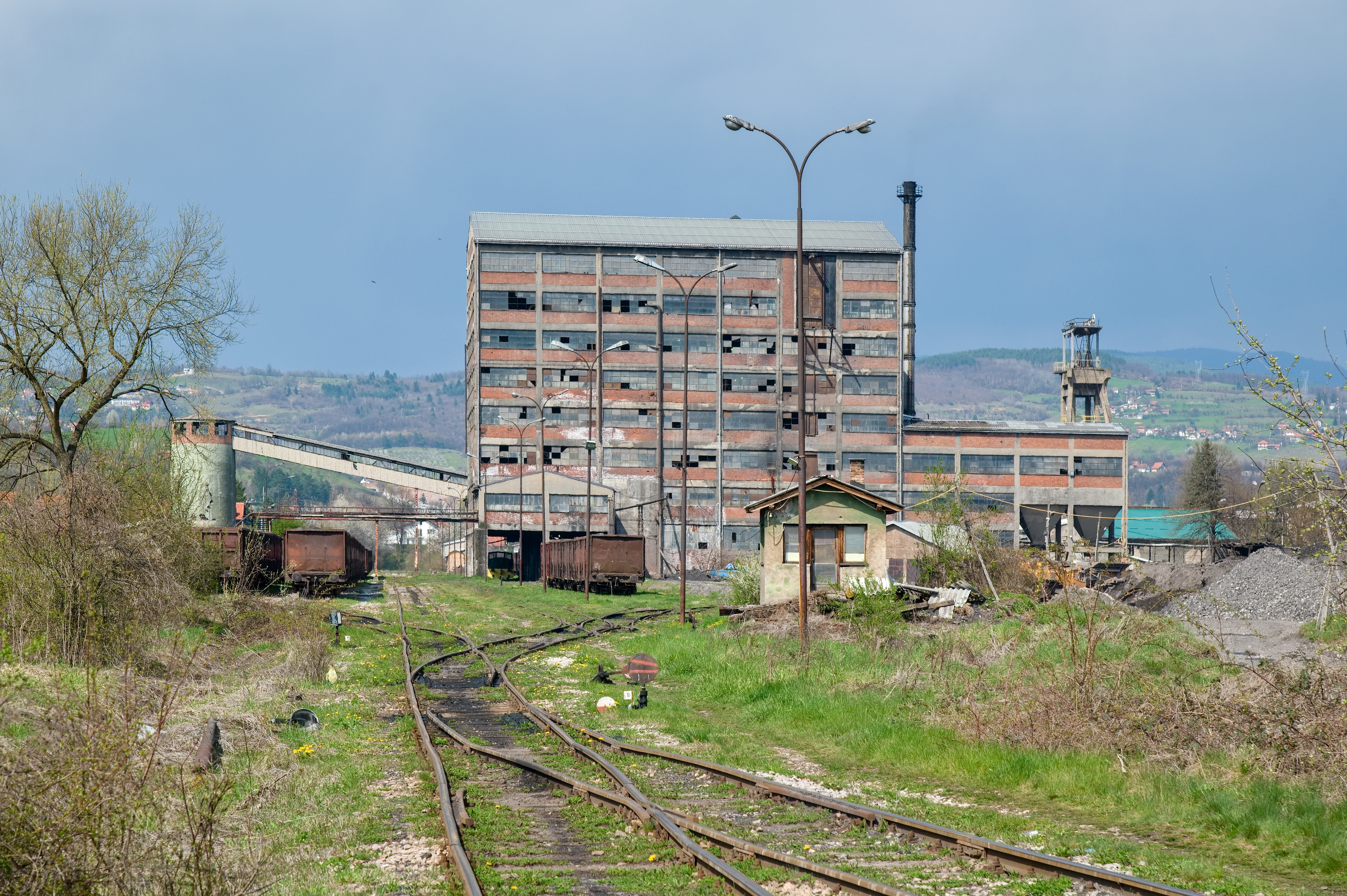
- View on Breza Coal Mine main building, April 2025

- Location within Bosnia and Herzegovina
- Location: Breza, Zenica-Doboj Canton, Bosnia and Herzegovina; 44°0′18″N 18°16′42″E 44°0′10″N 18°15′17″E
- Products: Lignite
- Production: 286,689 tonnes of coal (2024)
- Company: Elektroprivreda Bosne i Hercegovine

The Breza coal mine is a brown coal mine in Breza, Bosnia and Herzegovina, the Zenica-Doboj Canton. It is owned and operated by Elektroprivreda Bosne i Hercegovine.

The mine has coal reserves amounting to 73.1 million tonnes of lignite, one of the largest coal reserves in Europe and the world. The mine has an annual production generation of 286,689 tonnes of coal (as of 2024). Its coal is mainly used for the electricity generation at Kakanj Thermal Power Plant.
