= 1965 Kakanj mine disaster =

Methane gas explosion at coal mine in Kakanj, Yugoslavia

Coordinates: 44°08′40″N 18°05′32″E

The 1965 Kakanj mine disaster was a mining accident on 7 June 1965 at a Kakanj coal mine in Kakanj, SR Bosnia and Herzegovina, SFR Yugoslavia. 128 miners were killed. This was the second large-scale mining incident in Kakanj, after the 1934 disaster that killed 127 miners. The 1965 Kakanj disaster remained the worst in the history of Bosnia and Herzegovina until the Dobrnja-Jug mine disaster in 1990.

== Background ==
Exploitation of coal from the "Orasi" shaft of the Kakanj mine started in 1902.

== Accident ==
Around 12:25 PM on 7 June 1965, methane gas exploded at the Orasi mine shaft of the Kakanj mine. The explosion caused a cave-in. At the moment of explosion, there were 183 miners in the shaft. That evening, it was reported that 114 were killed, and thirty were wounded. On 8 June, the number of victims rose to 125. On 9 June, 126 victims whose bodies were found by then, were buried. About 30 thousand people attended the funeral. Two more wounded miners died in the Sarajevo hospital the same day.

== Trials ==
Trial of ten defendants accused of causing the accident started on 1 November 1965 in the district court of Sarajevo. Defendants were all members of the mine management: Esad Salčić, Alojz Železnik, Vlastimir Bucek, Hamza Omerović, Ejub Đokić, Matija Cigan, Alojz Špec, Nenad Mihaldžić, Ljubo Ćuk, and Muris Osmanagić. They were accused of neglecting safety and sanitary rules, and allowing the work to progress although they knew methane was accumulating in the shaft.

During the trial it was discovered that the probable cause of explosion were defective electrical installations, although one of the expert witnesses disagreed and said that the explosion was probably caused by smoking.

The judgement was delivered on 29 December 1965. Bucek was sentenced to 7½ years in prison, Omerović and Špec to seven years each, and Železnik to 6½ years. Salčić, Cigan, Mihaldžić, Ćuk and Osmanagić were acquitted. Proceedings against Đokić were postponed because he attempted suicide and was still in the hospital. Explaining the verdict, јudge Murđatbegović said that it was established that one of the main causes of the disaster was a barrier that was erected on the day of the disaster In the main corridor of the "Karaula" moat. This partition diverted the air flow over the "Ćifići" work site and from there carried methane to the main corridor, and then in the direction of the workers.

Đokić's trial started on 23 February 1966 in Sarajevo. He was accused of ordering the erection of wooden barrier that led to the explosion. On 24 February, Đokić was found guilty and sentenced to 8 years in prison.

On 26 April 1966, the trial against the mining inspector Sladimir Stupnicki commenced in Kakanj. He was accused of failing to properly inspect the mine in January 1965 and allowing the miners not to wear self-rescuing equipment.

After appeals to the Supreme Court of Bosnia and Herzegovina, on 7 December 1966, the sentences of Bucek and Železnik were reduced to four years each. The acquittal of Mihaldžić and Osmanagić was confirmed. The Supreme Court order a re-trial of the other five defendants and partial re-trial of Železnik. Đokić's sentence was also confirmed by the Supreme Court. Re-trial started on 12 March 1967. On 31 March 1967, all defendants were acquitted. Ćuk, Salčić, Omerović, Špec and Cigan were thus released. Železnik was still obliged to serve his sentence of four years for the confirmed part of the verdict.

Bucek was released from prison in September 1967.
