= Dobrnja-Jug mine disaster =

Mining accident in Bosnia and Herzegovina

Coordinates: 44°34′47.14″N 18°32′23.97″E

The Dobrnja-Jug mine disaster was a mining accident that happened on 26 August 1990 near Tuzla, Bosnia and Herzegovina. The accident occurred in the Dobrnja-jug shaft of the Mramor coal mine. The mine was operated by the Kreka company, which operates three other mines in the area. All of the coal mined in the region is used to power the Tuzla Thermal Power Plant.

The Dobrnja-jug disaster was the worst mining and industrial accident in the history of Bosnia and Herzegovina and the former Socialist Federal Republic of Yugoslavia, 180 miners were killed.

== Details ==
Between 01:20 and 01:30 a.m. on 26 August 1990 a methane gas explosion 1,800 feet below the surface caused a cave-in which buried the entire third shift who were near the site of the explosion. All 180 miners working in the shaft were killed. One miner, who operated the machinery which brought the lignite to the surface was the sole survivor.

== See also ==
- Kakanj mine disaster
