= Kakanj Thermal Power Plant =

Coal-fired power plant in Bosnia and Herzegovina

Kakanj Power Plant
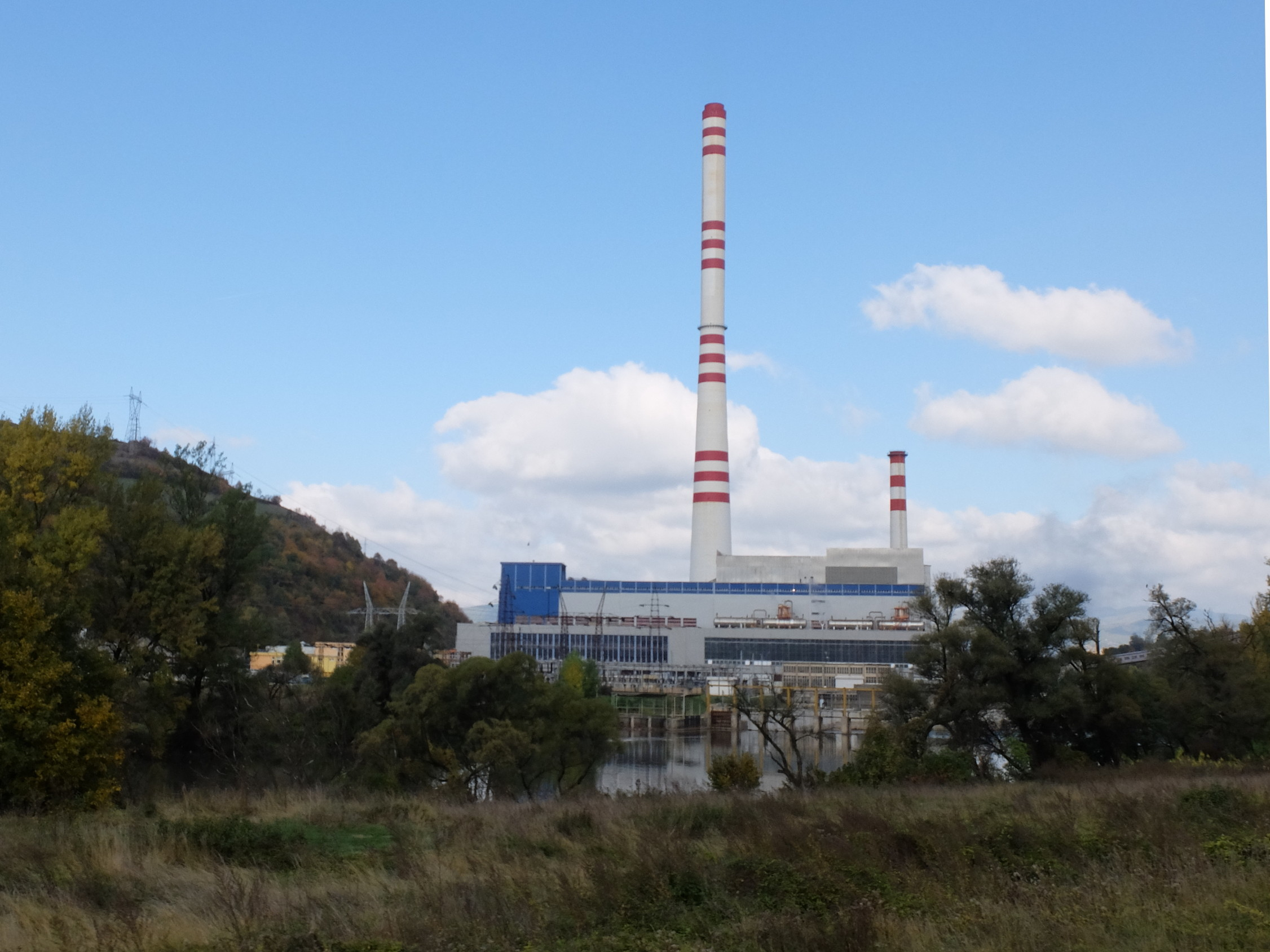
- View on Kakanj Power Plant, October 2015
- Country: Bosnia and Herzegovina
- Location: Kakanj
- Coordinates: 44°05′23″N 18°06′52″E
- Status: Operational
- Commission date: 1988; 38 years ago
- Owner: EBiH
- Operator: Elektroprivreda Bosne i Hercegovine

Thermal power station
- Primary fuel: Coal

Power generation
- Units operational: 7
- Nameplate capacity: 450 MW
- Annual net output: 1,431 GWh (2025)

External links
- Website: www.tekakanj.ba
- Commons: Related media on Commons

Kakanj Thermal Power Plant is one of Bosnia and Herzegovina's largest coal-fired power plant having an installed electric capacity of 450 MW and producing around 1,431 GWh of electricity annually (as of 2025). The power plant is operated by Elektroprivreda Bosne i Hercegovine.

The power plant uses coal as fuel from Kakanj coal mine, Breza coal mine, Abid Lolić and Gračanica coal mines. As the water cooling source, it uses the nearby river of Bosna. The chimney of Kakanj Power Plant is 300 meters tall and is one of the tallest man-made objects built in former Yugoslavia.

== History ==
Kakanj has been coal mining area since 1898. Construction of the coal-fired power plant started in 1947. and the first and unit was commissioned in 1956.

The construction of the second unit started and was completed in 1960. Five more units were constructed in the next 28 years. The last one, unit 7, was finished in 1988. A new 300-MW steam unit has been in planning and a 100-MW CCGT block may be built to replace the old 32-MW sets.

== Description ==
The Thermal Power Plant Kakanj is now one of the largest electricity generators in the Federation of Bosnia and Herzegovina. It has power generation units with an installed capacity of 578 MW. The power plant has a 300-metre (980 ft) tall stack, one of the tallest structures in Bosnia and Herzegovina.

== See also ==
- List of power stations in Bosnia and Herzegovina
