= Gornji Kamengrad =

- Village
- Location within Bosnia and Herzegovina
- Coordinates: 44.803534°N 16.529126°E
- Country: Bosnia and Herzegovina
- Entity: Federation of Bosnia and Herzegovina
- Canton: Una-Sana
- Municipality: Sanski Most

Area
  - Total: 2.67 sq mi (6.92 km^{2})

Population (2013)
  - Total: 1,311
  - Density: 491/sq mi (189/km^{2})
- Time zone: UTC+1 (CET)
  - Summer (DST): UTC+2 (CEST)

Gornji Kamengrad is a village in the municipality of Sanski Most, Federation of Bosnia and Herzegovina, Bosnia and Herzegovina.

== Demographics ==
According to the 2013 census, its population was 1,311.

Ethnicity in 2013
Ethnicity	Number	Percentage
Bosniaks	1,309	99.8%
Serbs	1	0.1%
other/undeclared	1	0.1%
Total	1,311	100%
