= Tušnica coal mine =

Coal mine in Tuzla Canton, Bosnia and Herzegovina

Tušnica Coal Mine
- Location within Bosnia and Herzegovina
- Location: Tušnica, City of Livno, Federation of Bosnia and Herzegovina, Canton 10, Bosnia and Herzegovina; 43°44′20″N 17°05′30″E
- Products: Lignite
- Company: Government of Canton 10

The Tušnica Coal Mine is an open-pit coal mine located in the Tuzla Canton. It is owned by the government of Canton 10.

The mine has coal reserves amounting to 78.9 million tonnes of lignite, one of the largest coal reserves in Europe and the world. The mine had an annual production capacity of 0.2 million tonnes of coal.

The mine was closed in 2015.
