= Kongora coal mine =

Coal mine in Tomislavgrad, Bosnia and Herzegovina

Kongora Coal Mine
- Location within Bosnia and Herzegovina
- Location: Kongora, Tomislavgrad municipality, Canton 10, Federation of Bosnia and Herzegovina, Bosnia and Herzegovina; 43°38′53″N 17°20′0″E
- Products: Lignite

The Kongora Coal Mine is a coal mine located in the Tomislavgrad municipality, Canton 10, Federation of Bosnia and Herzegovina. The mine has coal reserves amounting to 206.4 million tonnes of lignite, one of the largest coal reserves in Europe and the world. The mine has an annual production capacity of 0.4 million tonnes of coal.
