= Donji Kamengrad =

- Village
- Location within Bosnia and Herzegovina
- Coordinates: 44.791853°N 16.546354°E
- Country: Bosnia and Herzegovina
- Entity: Federation of Bosnia and Herzegovina
- Canton: Una-Sana
- Municipality: Sanski Most

Area
  - Total: 2.73 sq mi (7.06 km^{2})

Population (2013)
  - Total: 2,336
  - Density: 857/sq mi (331/km^{2})
- Time zone: UTC+1 (CET)
  - Summer (DST): UTC+2 (CEST)

Donji Kamengrad is a village in the municipality of Sanski Most, Federation of Bosnia and Herzegovina, Bosnia and Herzegovina.

== Demographics ==
According to the 2013 census, its population was 2,336.

Ethnicity in 2013
Ethnicity	Number	Percentage
Bosniaks	2,321	99.4%
Serbs	2	0.1%
Croats	1	0.0%
other/undeclared	12	0.5%
Total	2,336	100%
