= Kamengrad coal mine =

Coal mine in Una-Sana, Bosnia and Herzegovina

Kamengrad Coal Mine
- Location within Bosnia and Herzegovina
- Location: Sanski Most, Una-Sana, Bosnia and Herzegovina; 44°47′25″N 16°34′34″E
- Products: Lignite

The Kamengrad Coal Mine is a coal mine located in the Una-Sana Canton, Bosnia and Herzegovina. The mine has coal reserves amounting to 284.7 million tonnes of lignite, one of the largest coal reserves in Europe and the world. The mine has an annual production capacity of 0.4 million tonnes of coal and provides fuel to the Kamengrad lignite power plant.
