= Elektroprivreda Bosne i Hercegovine =

Bosnian public electric utility company

Elektroprivreda BiH

- JP Elektroprivreda BiH d.d. Sarajevo
- Type: Public
- Traded as: SASE: JPESR
- Industry: Energy
- Predecessor: Electric Utility Company of BiH "Elektrobih"
- Founded: 30 August 1945; 81 years ago
- Headquarters: Vilsonovo Šetalište 15, Sarajevo, Bosnia and Herzegovina
- Key people: v.d. Sanel Buljubašić, GM
- Products: Electricity
- Production output: 7.009 GWh (2017)
- Services: generation, transmission and distribution
- Revenue: €583.35 million (2017)
- Net income: €0.32 million (2017)
- Total equity: €1.721 billion (2017)
- Number of employees: 4,566 (2017)
- Parent: EPBiH Concern
- Website: elektroprivreda.ba

Elektroprivreda BiH or JP Elektroprivreda Bosne i Hercegovine d.d. (English: Public Enterprise Electric Utility of Bosnia and Herzegovina; abbr. EPBiH) is a Bosnian public electric utility company with headquarters in Sarajevo, Bosnia and Herzegovina.

== History ==
Elektroprivreda BiH was established on 30 August 1945 as the Electric Utility Company of Bosnia and Herzegovina "Elektrobih". On 20 May 2004, it became an entity government-owned publicly traded company. The company celebrates 7 September as the day of its establishment.

== Structure ==
The company is the largest electric utility company in Bosnia and Herzegovina, and as such part of the largest country's energy concern EPBiH Concern. Elektroprivreda BiH is a joint stock company in which 90% of the capital is owned by the Federation of BiH entity government, and 10% is owned by minority shareholders.

== Operations ==
Electric utility activities for the company are:

- generation and distribution of electricity,
- supply of electricity,
- trading, representation and mediation on the local electricity market,
- export and import of electricity, including the management of electricity system.

As the largest electric utility company in Bosnia and Herzegovina, it has 756,599 customers and 4,434 employees. As of 2017, the company has an installed generating capacities of 1,682 MW, of which in lignite-fired thermal power plants 1,165 MW, and hydro power plants 517 MW. It has a transmission and distribution lines of 27.405 km in a network of 31,757 kilometres (19,733 mi), with 2.825 MVA distribution substations.

Also, it generates 7.009 TWh of electricity annually.

Electricity distribution is organized through five distribution regional offices:

- Elektrodistribucija Sarajevo,
- Elektrodistribucija Tuzla,
- Elektrodistribucija Zenica,
- Elektrodistribucija Bihać,
- Elektrodistribucija Mostar.

== See also ==
- List of companies of Bosnia and Herzegovina
- Elektroprivreda HZ HB
- Elektroprivreda Republike Srpske
