= Basil (name) =

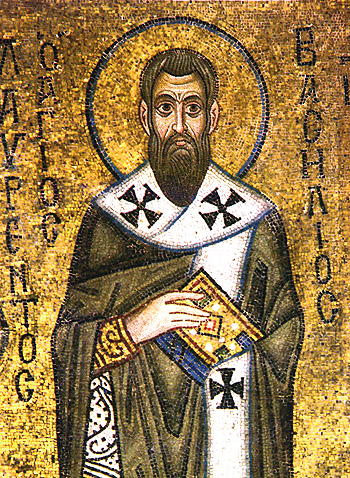
- Basil of Caesarea
- Pronunciation: /ˈbæzəl/ BAZ-əl, /ˈbɑːsəl/ BAH-səl
- Gender: Male

Origin
- Origin: Greek, Arabic
- Meaning: "royal, kingly, brave, valiant, chivalrous" in Greek; "brave, fearless, intrepid" in Arabic

Other names
- Related names: Barsegh, Basel, Basile, Basileo, Basilio, Basílio, Basilius, Bassel, Bazil, Bazsó, Bażilju, Vasil, Vasile, Vasilije, Vasily, Vassilios, Vasyl, Vászoly, Vazul

The name Basil (royal, kingly) comes from the male Greek name Vassilios (Greek: Βασίλειος, female version Bασιλεία), which first appeared during the Hellenistic period. It is derived from "basileus" (Greek: βασιλεύς), a Greek word of pre-Hellenic origin, meaning "king", from which words such as basilica and basilisk (via Latin) as well as the eponymous herb basil (via Old French) derive, and the name of the Italian region Basilicata, which had been long under the rule of the Byzantine Emperor (also called basileus).

Derived names in different languages include Barsegh in Armenian; Basile in French; Basilius in German; Basilio in Italian and Spanish; Basílio in Portuguese; Basileo in Galician; Vasyl in Ukraine; Vasile in Romanian; Vasil in Bulgarian; Vasilije in Serbian; Vasiliy in Russian; Bazil, Bazsó, Vászoly and Vazul in Hungarian.

Notable people with the name include:

== Rulers ==
- Basil Onomagoulos (died 717), Byzantine usurper in Sicily in 717
- Basil I the Macedonian (811–886), Byzantine Emperor from 867
- Basil II Bulgaroktonus (958–1025), Byzantine Emperor from 976
- Basil Lekapenos (925–985), chief administrator of the Byzantine Empire from 945
- Basil of Trebizond (died 1340), ruled from 1332
- Fasilides (1603–1667), Ethiopian Emperor from 1603
- Basil of Naples, the first Duke of Naples from 661 to 666

== Generals ==
- Basil Apokapes (924–977), Byzantine general of the mid-11th century
- Basil Boioannes, Catepan of Italy in 1017–1027
- Basil Mesardonites (died 1016), Catepan of Italy in 1010–1017
- Basil Theodorokanos, Catepan of Italy in 1043

== Religious figures ==
- Basil of Caesarea (330–379), also known as Saint Basil the Great, 4th-century bishop of Caesarea
- Basil the Elder, father of Basil the Great and saint of the Eastern Orthodox Church
- Basil of Ancyra (hieromartyr) (died 362), a 4th-century Christian priest and hieromartyr
- Basil of Ancyra (martyr) (died 331–363)
- Basil of Amasea, a fourth-century Christian bishop and martyr
- Basil of Cilicia, late 5th century historian of Christianity
- Basil I of Bulgaria, the first Patriarch of the Bulgarian Orthodox Church (c. 1186 – c. 1232) after restoring the Tarnovo Patriarchate
- Basil II of Bulgaria, Patriarch of the Bulgarian Orthodox Church (c. 1246 – c. 1263)
- Basil III of Bulgaria, Patriarch of the Bulgarian Orthodox Church (c. 1254 – c. 1263)
- Basil Fool for Christ (1468/1469–1552/1557), Russian Orthodox saint
- Basil of Ostrog (1610–1671), Serbian Orthodox bishop and saint
- Basil the Physician (died 1118), Bogomil leader burned at the stake as a heretic
- Basil of Seleucia (died probably between 458 and 460), metropolitan bishop of Seleucia ad Calycadnum
- Basil the Confessor (died 750), Eastern Orthodox saint
- Basil Hopko (1904–1976), bishop of the Slovak Greek Catholic Church and martyr
- Basil Hume (1923–1999), English Roman Catholic cardinal and Archbishop of Westminster
- Basil Moreau (1799–1873), French Roman Catholic priest who founded the Congregation of Holy Cross and was beatified

=== Variant Baselios ===
- Baselios I bar Baldoyo, Maphrian of the East (828–830) (See List of maphrians)
- Baselios II, Maphrian of the East (848–868) (See List of maphrians)
- Baselios III, Maphrian of the East (936–960) (See List of maphrians)
- Baselios IV of Tagrit, Maphrian of the East (1046–1069) (See List of maphrians)
- Baselios Behnam Hadliyo (died 1454), Maphrian of the East (1404–1412), later Ignatius Behnam Hadliyo, Patriarch of Antioch, and head of the Syriac Orthodox Church from 1445 until his death in 1454
- Baselios Philoxenus, Maphrian of the East (1471–1487) (See List of maphrians)
- Baselios Abraham, Maphrian of the East (1496–1508) (See List of maphrians)
- Baselios Solomon (died 1518), Maphrian of the East of the Syriac Orthodox Church, from 1509 until his death in 1518
- Baselios Blias, Maphrian of the East (1518–1523) (See List of maphrians)
- Baselios, Maphrian of Mosul, a great number of maphrians all called Baselios (See List of maphrians#Maphrians of Mosul (1533–1860)
- Baselios Lazarus III (died 1713), Maphrian of the East of the Syriac Orthodox Church, from 1709 until his death in 1713
- Baselios Sakralla III of Aleppo (died 1764), Maphriyano (Catholicos) of the Syriac Orthodox Church of the East from 1748 to 1760. He came to India in 1751 and was buried there
- Baselios Cleemis (born 1959), Cardinal, Major Archbishop-Catholicos of the Syro-Malankara Catholic Church
- Baselios Paulose I (1836–1913), Catholicos of the East, the First Catholicos of the Malankara Orthodox Syrian Church from 1912 to 1913
- Baselios Paulose II (1914–1996), Catholicos of India of the Jacobite Syrian Christian Church from 1975 to 1996
- Baselios Mar Thoma Paulose II (1946–2021), Catholicos of the East of the Malankara Orthodox Syrian Church from 2010
- Baselios Thomas I (1929–2024), Catholicos of India, Maphrian, head of the Jacobite Syrian Christian Church, the Syriac Orthodox Church in India
- Baselios Yeldo (1593–1685), a saint, Maphrian of the East of the Syriac Orthodox Church from 1678 until his resignation in 1684
- Cyril Baselios (1935–2007), Maphrian, the first Major Archbishop of the Syro-Malankara Catholic Church

=== Variant Basilides ===
- Basilides (2nd century AD), Egyptian Gnostic religious teacher

== Given name ==
- Basil Alkazzi (born 1938), Kuwaiti-born British painter
- Basil Arthur (1928–1985), New Zealand politician
- Basil Kiiza Bataringaya, (1927–1972) Ugandan politician
- Basil Bennett (1894–1938), American athlete and Olympic bronze medal winner in hammer throw
- Basil Bernstein (1924–2000), British sociologist and linguist
- Basil Brooke, 1st Viscount Brookeborough (1888–1973), politician and third Prime Minister of Northern Ireland
- Basil W. Brown (1927–1997), American politician
- Basil Bunting (1900–1985), British modernist poet
- H. Basil Christian (1871–1950), South African/Rhodesian farmer and horticulturalist
- Basil Dearden (1911–1971), British film director
- Basil W. Duke (1838–1916), Confederate American Civil War general and historian
- Basil Embry (1902–1977), British Royal Air Force officer
- Basil Favis (20th century), Canadian chemist and professor
- Basil Gogos (1929–2017), American illustrator
- Basil Gomez (born 1955), Anglo-American geomorphologist
- Basil Gunasekara (1929–2024), 7th Commander of the Sri Lanka Navy
- Basil Buzz Hargrove, known as Buzz Hargrove (1944–2025), Canadian labour union leader
- B. H. Liddell Hart (1895–1970), English soldier, military historian and leading inter-war theorist
- Basil Hetzel (1922–2017), Australian medical researcher
- Basil Hiley (1935–2025), British quantum physicist
- Basil Hood (1864–1917), British librettist and lyricist
- Basil Joseph (born 1990), Indian actor/director
- Basil Al Kubaisi (1934–1973), assassinated Iraqi nationalist activist and academic
- Basil McIntosh, Bahamian politician
- Basil Mott (1859–1938), British civil engineer
- Basil O'Connor (1892–1972), American lawyer and chairman and president of the American Red Cross
- Basil O'Meara (1892–1971), Canadian sports journalist
- Basil Charles Godfrey Place (1921–1994), British Royal Navy rear-admiral and recipient of the Victoria Cross
- Basil Radford (1897–1952), British actor
- Basil Rathbone (1892–1967), British actor
- Basil Spence (1907–1976), Scottish architect
- Basil Thampi (born 1983), Indian cricketer
- Basil Valdez (born 1951), Filipino singer
- Basil Wolverton (1909–1978), American cartoonist, illustrator, comic book writer-artist
- Basil Zaharoff (1849–1936), Greek arms trader and financier, and chairman of the Vickers munitions company during World War I

== Surname ==
- Richard Basil (born 1967), American former college football coach
- Sam Basil (1969–2022), Papua New Guinean politician
- Sam Basil Jr., Papua New Guinean politician
- Steve Basil (1893–1962), American baseball umpire
- Toni Basil, stage name of American musician, video artist, actress, and choreographer Antonia Basilotta (born 1943)
- Wassily de Basil (1888–1951), Russian ballet impresario

=== Variant Bacile ===
- Giovanni Bacile (1880–1941), Italian Roman Catholic priest

=== Variant Baseley ===
- Godfrey Baseley (1904–1997), American radio executive
- William Baseley (1521–1573/74), English politician, member of the Parliament of England in 1554 and 1555

=== Variant Basile ===
- see Basile#Surname

=== Variant Basilio ===
- see Basilio#Surname

=== Variant Basilius ===
- István Basilius (1549–1581), Hungarian Unitarian minister
- See Basilius for the Greek nobility title

=== Variant Basilone ===
- John Basilone (1916–1945), American soldier and U.S. Marine, recipient of the Medal of Honor

=== Variant Bassil ===
- see Bassil

=== Variant Bazeley ===
- see Bazeley

=== Variant Bazell ===
- Josh Bazell (born 1970), American author and physician
- Robert Bazell (20th century), American academic

=== Variant Bazil ===
- Louis Bazil (1695–1752), French merchant and militia officer
- Ezekiel Bazil (born 1965), Dominican politician

=== Variant Bazley ===
- see Bazley

=== Variant Pasi ===
- Riccardo Pasi (born 1990), Italian footballer
- Geeta Pasi (born 1962), American diplomat

=== Variant Vasil ===
- Adria Vasil (21st century), Canadian journalist

=== Variant Vasile ===
- see Vasile#As a surname

=== Variant Vasili ===
- Laert Vasili (born 1974), Greek Albanian actor and director
- Petrit Vasili (born 1958), Albanian politician
- Eni Vasili, Albanian journalist, writer, former news reporter, and TV talk show host

=== Variant Vasilj ===
- Ivan Anton Vasilj (born 1991), Croatian football player
- Mario Vasilj (born 1983), Swedish professional footballer
- Vladimir Vasilj (born 1975), Croatian professional footballer

=== Variant Vasko ===
- Vasko (surname)

=== Variant Vasović ===
- see Vasović

=== Variant Vassili ===
- Amaury Vassili (born 1989), French singer

=== Variant Wasilewski ===
- see Wasilewski

== Fictional characters ==
- Basil Fawlty, the main character in Fawlty Towers
- Basil Brush, a glove puppet fox on children's television in the UK
- Basil "Bas" Baddingham, from the Rutshire Chronicles novel series and its adaptation Rivals
