= Vasile =

Vasile is a male Romanian given name or a surname. It is equivalent to the English name Basil which is of Greek origin and means "King". It is also used by the Megleno-Romanians.

== As a given name ==
- Vasile Adamachi (1817–1892), philanthropist
- Vasile Aftenie (1899–1950), bishop, martyr of the faith
- Vasile Alecsandri (1821–1890), poet
- Vasile Antonescu (born 1990), professional tennis player
- Vasile Atanasiu (1886–1964), general
- Vasile Bahnaru (1949–2024), historian
- Vasile Balan (1950–2012), politician
- Vasile Blaga (born 1956), politician
- Vasile Bodea (born 1980), presbyter for Grace Romanian Pentecostal Church
- Vasile Botnari (born 1975), economist and politician
- Vasile Buhăescu (born 1988), soccer player
- Vasile Bumacov (born 1957), politician
- Vasile Bătrânac (1925–20??), political prisoner
- Vasile Cârlova (1809–1831), Wallachian officer and poet
- Vasile Cerescu (Ciorăscu), Bessarabian politician
- Vasile Chiroiu (1910–1976), football defender
- Vasile Chițu (1896–1968), general in World War II
- Vasile Cijevschi (1881–1931), politician, administrator, and writer
- Vasile Ciorăscu, politician
- Vasile Conta (1845–1882), philosopher
- Vasile Deheleanu (1908–2003), footballer
- Vasile Demetrius (1878–1942), writer
- Vasile Diacon (born 2000), wrestler
- Vasile Dîncu (born 1961), politician
- Vasile Dumitrescu, bobsledder
- Vasile Gafencu (1886–1942), politician
- Vasile Gergely (born 1941), soccer player
- Vasile Ghenzul, politician
- Vasile Gheorghiu (1872–1959), theologian
- Vasile Ghindaru (born 1978), soccer player
- Vasile Ghioc (born 1978), footballer
- Vasile Godja (1954–2016), soccer coach
- Vasile Goldiș (1862–1934), politician
- Vasile Grigorcea, diplomat
- Vasile Hossu (disambiguation), multiple
- Vasile Hutopilă (born 1953), Hutsul painter
- Vasile Ianovici (1806-1866), priest
- Vasile Iordache (born 1950), soccer player
- Vasile Jula (born 1974), soccer player
- Vasile Luca (1898–1963), communist politician
- Vasile Lucaciu (1852–1922), Greek-Catholic priest
- Vasile Lupu (1595–1661), Moldavian Voivode
- Vasile M. Popov (born 1928), systems theorist
- Vasile Maftei (born 1981), soccer player
- Vasile Milea (1927–1989), communist Minister of Defense
- Vasile Miriuță (born 1968), soccer player
- Vasile Moga (1774–1845), bishop
- Vasile Mogos (born 1992), soccer player
- Vasile Morțun (1860–1919), politician and writer
- Vasile Noveanu (1904–1992), activist of the Iron Guard
- Vasile Oprea (born 1957), handball player
- Vasile Pârvan (1882–1927), historian
- Vasile Patilineț (1923–1986), communist politician
- Vasile Pogor (1883–1906), poet
- Vasile Popescu (1925–2003), basketball player
- Vasile Păcuraru (born 1987), soccer player
- Vasile Păun (1850–1908), poet and critic
- Vasile Roaită (1914–1933), railway worker
- Vasile Savel (1885–1932), writer
- Vasile Șeicaru (born 1951), Romanian folk musician
- Vasile Stati (born 1939), Moldovan politician
- Vasile Stîngă (born 1957), handball player
- Vasile Stoica (1889–1959), writer and politician
- Vasile Suciu (bishop) (1873–1935), bishop
- Vasile Suciu (footballer) (1942–2013), footballer
- Vasile Șirli (born 1948), musical composer and producer
- Vasile Tarlev (born 1963), Moldovan politician
- Vasile Tcaciuc (died 1935), Romanian serial killer
- Vasile Tomoiagă (born 1964), rower
- Vasile Ursu Nicola (Horea, 1731–1785), leader of peasant revolt
- Vasile Voiculescu (1884–1963), writer
- Vasile Zavoda (1929–2014), soccer player

== As a surname ==
- Cristian Vasile (1908–1974), Romanian tango-romance singer
- Nicolae Vasile (born 1995), Romanian professional footballer
- Niculina Vasile (born 1958), former Romanian high jumper
- Radu Vasile (1942–2013), Romanian politician and Prime Minister
- Ștefan Vasile (born 1982), Romanian Olympic canoer

== Places ==
- Pârâul lui Vasile, a river in Romania
- Valea lui Vasile, a river in Romania

== See also ==
- Vasiliu (surname)
- Vasilescu (surname)
- Vasilievca (disambiguation)
- Vasile Alecsandri (disambiguation)
- Vasileuți, name of two villages in Moldova and Ukraine
