= Bassil =

Bassil is a surname of Ancient Greek origin. It is a derivative of the name Basil (royal, kingly), which comes from the name Vassilios. It is not to be confused with Bassel.

This surname, recorded in spellings including Basil, Bassile, Bazelle, Bazeley, Basilon and Vasile, derives from the word "basileios" meaning royal, and originally was given only to children of royal or noble birth.

In the 4th century A.D. the name was born by Basil of Caesarea, the bishop of Caesarea, and long regarded as one of the four fathers of the Eastern (Christian) Church.

== History ==
=== History in France ===
The surname Bassil was first found in Burgundy (French: Bourgogne), an administrative and historical region of east-central France where the family has been a prominent family for centuries, and held a family seat with lands and manor. The family were well established in the region of Dijonnais and several members of the family distinguished themselves through their contributions toward the community in which they lived and were rewarded with lands, titles and letters patent confirming their nobility.

== People ==
=== Given name ===
- Bassil Da Costa (1990–2014), Venezuelan university student, killed during the 2014 protests against the Government of Venezuela

=== Surname ===
- François Bassil (born 1934), banker and founder of Byblos Bank
- Gebran Bassil (born 1970), politician
- Mario Bassil (born 1966), Lebanese comedian, TV presenter, producer and director
- Ray Bassil (born 1988), Lebanese trapshooter
- Semaan Bassil (born 1965), Lebanese banker
