= Vasil =

Vasil (Bulgarian and Macedonian: Васил, Georgian: ვასილ) is a Bulgarian, Macedonian and Georgian masculine given name. It may refer to:

- Vasil Adzhalarski, Bulgarian revolutionary, an IMARO leader of revolutionary bands
- Vasil Amashukeli (1886–1977), early Georgian film director & cinematographer in Azerbaijan and Georgia
- Vasil Angelov (1882–1953), Bulgarian military officer and a revolutionary, a worker of IMARO
- Vasil Aprilov (1789–1847), Bulgarian educator
- Vasil Barnovi (1856–1934), Georgian writer popular for his historical novels
- Vasiľ Biľak (1917–2014), Slovak Communist leader of Rusyn origin
- Vasil Binev (born 1957), Bulgarian actor
- Vasil Boev (born 1988), Bulgarian footballer
- Vasil Bollano, the ethnic Greek mayor of Himara municipality, in southwest Albania
- Vasil Bozhikov (born 1988), Bulgarian football defender
- Vasil Bykaŭ (1924–2003), prolific Belarusian author of novels and novellas about World War II
- Vasil Chekalarov (1874–1913), Bulgarian revolutionary and one of the leaders of IMARO in Aegean Macedonia
- Vasil Dragolov (born 1962), Bulgarian footballer
- Vasil Etropolski (born 1959), Bulgarian Olympic and world champion sabre fencer
- Vasil Garvanliev (born 1984), Macedonian classic and pop singer
- Vasil Gendov (1891–1970), Bulgarian actor, film director and screenwriter
- Vasil Gigiadze (born 1977), Georgian footballer
- Vasil Glavinov (1872–1929), Bulgarian socialist from Ottoman Macedonia, a member of the Bulgarian Workers' Social Democratic Party
- Vasil Gruev (born 1926), Bulgarian cross country skier who competed in the 1950s
- Vasil Gyuzelev, Bulgarian historian who studies Bulgaria during the Middle Ages
- Vasil Iliev, Bulgarian mobster, businessman and wrestler
- Vasil Iljoski (1902–1995), Macedonian writer, dramatist, professor
- Vasil Kaloyanov (born 1988), Bulgarian footballer
- Vasil Kamburov (born 1975), Bulgarian footballer
- Vasil Kanchov (1862–1904), Bulgarian geographer, ethnographer and politician
- Vasil Khamutowski (born 1978), Belarusian football goalkeeper
- Vasil Kirov (born 1975), Bulgarian footballer
- Vasil Kiryienka (born 1981), Belarusian racing cyclist for UCI ProTeam Team Sky
- Vasil Kochev (born 1988), Bulgarian professional footballer
- Vasil Kolarov (1877–1950), Bulgarian communist political leader and leading functionary in the Communist International
- Vasil Kutinchev (1859–1941), Bulgarian officer
- Vasil Laçi (1922–1941), Albanian patriot and monarchist; attempted to kill the King of Italy and Prime Minister of Albania
- Vasil Levski (1837–1873), Bulgarian revolutionary and a national hero of Bulgaria
- Vasil Mzhavanadze (1902–1988), the First Secretary of the Communist Party of the Georgian SSR from 1953 to 1972
- Vasil Naydenov, Bulgarian singer-songwriter, popular in Bulgaria and the Eastern bloc during the late 1970s and 1980s
- Vasil Panayotov (born 1990), Bulgarian football player
- Vasil Radoslavov (1854–1929), leading Bulgarian liberal politician who twice served as Prime Minister
- Vasil Ringov (1955–2025), Macedonian football player
- Vasil Ruci, Albanian football striker
- Vasil Shanto (1913–1944), Albanian communist leader and a hero of World War II
- Vasil Shkurti (born 1992), Albanian footballer
- Vasil Sikharulidze (born 1968), Georgian diplomat and politician
- Vasil Slavov (born 1958), Bulgarian author and poet
- Vasil Spasov (chess player) (born 1971), Bulgarian chess grandmaster
- Vasil Tole (born 1963), Albanian composer of European classical music
- Vasil Tsereteli (1862–1937), Georgian physician, journalist and public benefactor
- Vasil Tupurkovski, Macedonian academic, politician and the current president of the Macedonian Olympic Committee
- Vasil Varlamos (born 1942), Australian rules footballer
- Vasil Vasilev (footballer, born 1976), Bulgarian footballer
- Vasil Vasilev (footballer, born 1984), Bulgarian football defender
- Vasil Velev (born 1984), Bulgarian footballer
- Vasil Yakusha (1958–2020), Belarusian rower who competed for the Soviet Union in the 1980 Summer Olympics and in the 1988 Summer Olympics
- Vasil Zacharka (1877–1943), Belarusian statesman and the second president of the Belarusian People's Republic in exile
- Vasil Zlatarski, Bulgarian historian-medievalist, archaeologist, and epigraphist

== See also ==
- Vasil Levski (disambiguation)
- "Vasil Vasiltsiv", song by Esthetic Education devoted to young Ukrainian singer Vasyl Vasyltsiv
- Vassil, masculine given name and a surname
- Vasilj (given name) (Serbian Cyrillic: Васиљ), Serbian masculine given name
- Vasiĺ (Belarusian: Васіль), Belarusian masculine given name
- Vasyl (Ukrainian: Василь), Ukrainian masculine given name
- Vasiliy (Russian: Василий), Russian masculine given name
