= List of Macedonian Bulgarians =

A list of Macedonian Bulgarians.

== Architects ==
- Aleksandar Barov

== Businessmen ==
- Vasil Eshcoff (1882–1961)
- Kiradjieff brothers
- Kroum Pindoff (1915–2013)

== Clerics ==
- Paisiy Hilendarski (1722–1773)
- Kiril Peychinovich (1770–1865)
- Neofit Rilski (1793–1881)
- Parteniy Zografski (died 1876)
- Nathanael of Ohrid (1820–1906)
- Lazar Mladenov (1854–1917)

== Composers ==
- Atanas Badev (1860–1908)

== Diplomats ==
- Dimitar Rizov (1862–1918)
- Nikola Stoyanov (1874–1967)
- Simeon Radev (1879–1967)

== Literature ==
- Hristofor Zhefarovich (18th-century)
- Miladinov brothers (1810–1862)
- Marko Tsepenkov (1829–1920)
- Grigor Parlichev (1830–1893)
- Georgi Pulevski (1817–1893), writer
- Kuzman Shapkarev (1834–1909)
- Yordan Hadzhikonstantinov-Dzhinot (1818–1882)
- Krste Misirkov (1874–1926)
- Voydan Popgeorgiev - Chernodrinski (1875–1951)
- Hristo Silyanov (1880–1939)
- Dimitar Talev (1898–1966)
- Hristo Smirnenski (1898–1923)
- Atanas Dalchev (1904–1978)
- Nikola Vaptsarov (1909–1942)
- Venko Markovski (1915–1988)
- Krastyo Hadzhiivanov (1929–1952)
- Rayko Zhinzifov (1839–1877)

== Military leaders ==
- Kliment Boyadzhiev (1861–1933)
- Krastyu Zlatarev (1864–1925)
- Konstantin Zhostov (1867–1916)
- Boris Drangov (1872–1917)
- Petar Darvingov (1875–1958)
- Kiril Yanchulev (1896–1961)

== Politicians ==
- Dimitar Blagoev (1856–1924)
- Andrey Lyapchev (1866–1933)
- Dimitar Vlahov (1878–1953)
- Georgi Kulishev (1885–1974)
- Spiro Kitinchev (1895–1946)
- Georgi Traykov (1898–1975)
- Anton Yugov (1904–1991)
- Metodi Shatorov (1897–1944)
- Rosen Plevneliev (born 1964)

== Revolutionaries ==
- Chavdar Voyvoda (16th-century)
- Ilyo Voyvoda (1822–1900)
- Hristo Makedonski (1835–1916)
- Dimitar Popgeorgiev (1840–1907)
- Georgi Izmirliev (1851–1876)
- Trayko Kitanchev (1858–1895)
- Kosta Shahov (1862–1917)
- Gyorche Petrov (1864–1921)
- Pere Toshev (1865–1912)
- Aleksandar Protogerov (1867–1928)
- Dzole Stojchev (1867–1909)
- Andon Dimitrov (1867–1933)
- Petar Poparsov (1868–1941)
- Hristo Tatarchev (1869–1952)
- Ivan Hadzhinikolov (1869–1934)
- Apostol Petkov (1869–1911)
- Dame Gruev (1871–1906)
- Boris Sarafov (1872–1907)
- Gotse Delchev (1872–1903)
- Kiryak Shkurtov (1872–1965)
- Hristo Matov (1872–1922)
- Aleksandar Turundzhev (1872–1905)
- Yane Sandanski (1872–1915)
- Vasil Chekalarov (1874–1913)
- Kiril Parlichev (1875–1944)
- Metody Patchev (1875–1902)
- Dimo Hadzhidimov (1875–1924)
- Nikola Karev (1877–1905)
- Slaveyko Arsov (1877–1904)
- Kosta Tsipushev (1877–1968)
- Mile Popyordanov (1877–1901)
- Lazar Poptraykov (1878–1903)
- Hristo Uzunov (1878–1905)
- Vasil Adzhalarski (1880–1909)
- Ivan Antonov (1880–1928)
- Manush Georgiev (1881–1908)
- Todor Aleksandrov (1881–1924)
- Petar Chaulev (1882–1924)
- Pavel Shatev (1882–1951)
- Panko Brashnarov (1883–1951)
- Andon Kyoseto (1885–1953)
- Hristo Batandzhiev (died 1913)
- Hristo Andonov (1887–1928)
- Ivan Mihailov (1896–1990)
- Dimitar Chkatrov (1900–1945)
- Dimitar Gyuzelov (1903–1945)
- Mara Buneva (1902–1928)
- Andon Kalchev (1910–1948)
- Anastas Lozanchev (1870–1945)

== Scholars ==
- Lyubomir Miletich (1863–1937)
- Nikola Milev (1881–1925)
- Blagoy Shklifov (1935–2003)
- Zorka Parvanova (born 1958)

== Singers ==
- Iliya Argirov (1932–2012)
- Lyubka Rondova (born 1936)

== Sport ==
- Spiro Debarski (born 1933)
- Nikola Kovachev (1934–2009)
- Vasil Metodiev (born 1935)
- Boris Gaganelov (born 1941)
- Aleksandar Tomov (born 1949)
- Stoycho Mladenov (born 1957)
- Ivan Lebanov (born 1957)
- Simeon Shterev (born 1959)
- Krasimir Bezinski (born 1961)
- Kiril Georgiev (born 1965)
- Petar Mihtarski (born 1966)
- Ivaylo Andonov (born 1967)
- Stoycho Stoilov (born 1971)
- Dimtcho Beliakov (born 1971)
- Irina Nikulchina (born 1974)
- Serafim Barzakov (born 1975)
- Georgi Bachev (born 1977)
- Dimitar Berbatov (born 1981)
- Kiril Terziev (born 1983)
- Borislav Hazurov (born 1985)
- Kostadin Hazurov (born 1985)
- Stanislav Manolev (born 1985)
- Iliyan Mitsanski (born 1985)
- Yanko Sandanski (born 1988)
- Spas Delev (born 1988)
- Dobriana Rabadžieva (born 1991)
- Aleksandar Vezenkov (born 1995)
- Kiril Despodov (born 1995)
- Rachel Stoyanov (born 2003)

== Others ==
- Daskal Kamche (1790–1848)
- Baba Vanga (1911–1996)

== See also ==
- Macedonian Bulgarians
