= Joumana Bassil Chelala =

Deputy General Manager of Group Consumer Banking

Joumana Bassil Chelala (born 1966) is the Deputy General Manager and head of Group Consumer Banking at Byblos Bank S.A.L., Lebanon’s third largest listed bank. She was featured on Forbes Middle East’s list of Most Powerful Arab Women in 2014, 2015, and 2017, and was featured on the magazine’s 2018 lists of the Middle East’s Most Influential Women and the top 15 Most Powerful Lebanese businesswomen. She also sits on the board of directors of the Chamber of Commerce, Industry, and Agriculture of Beirut and Mount Lebanon.

== Early life, education ==
Bassil Chelala was born in Lebanon in 1966 to François Bassil and Raymonde Al-Lati, one of three children. Her paternal grandfather and his brother founded Société Commerciale et Agricole Byblos Frères & Co., a Lebanese company originally focused on natural silk and leather tanning, and subsequently adding agricultural and consumer credit activities. In 1950 the company changed its name to Byblos Bank S.A.L., with her father among the new founding members and later (1979-2015) its Chairman and General Manager. In 2015, her brother Semaan Bassil was elected Chairman and General Manager of the Bank. Her maternal lineage also has strong banking roots, with the Lati family having established Bank LATI S.A.L., one of Lebanon’s oldest banks, in 1924. Bassil Chelala holds a BA in International Business Administration from American University of Paris (AUP), a BS in Business Marketing from Beirut University College, and an MA in Marketing from the École supérieure des affaires (Beirut) (ESA, or Higher School of Business), under a joint program with ESCP Europe, in Beirut.

== Career ==
Bassil Chelala joined Byblos Bank in 1991 as the founding Head of its new Communication and Marketing Department. She then worked in a series of increasingly senior positions, gaining broader experience in retail banking and a reputation for embracing new technologies. During this period, Bassil Chelala was behind the launch of many firsts in the Lebanese banking sector, including: the first full-fledged Marketing and Communication Department; the first dedicated retail personal and housing loan products; the first TV advertising campaign; the first outdoor corporate advertising campaign; and the first credit card denominated in Lebanese Pounds. In 2011 Bassil Chelala was made Deputy General Manager, retaining her role as Head of the Group Consumer Banking and Distribution Channels Division.

== Community ==
Bassil Chelala was a founding member of the Lebanese Center for Special Education. She also is a member of the Lebanese Cooperative for Development, which uses micro-finance and other tools to reduce poverty and complete the return of Lebanon’s displaced, helping families in towns and villages to resist migration to cities or even other countries. In addition, she sits on the Board of Directors of Adonis Insurance and Reinsurance Company (ADIR), one of the leading insurance companies in Lebanon, and Berytech, a business incubator focused on startups and other growing enterprises in Lebanon’s technology, multimedia, and healthcare sectors.

== Personal life ==
Bassil Chelala is married to Mario Chelala, a prominent Lebanese entrepreneur who owns SIMCO Engineering and Trading, a Lebanese electro-mechanical company specialized in the concept, design, and implementation of large-scale projects. He is also the co-founder of Byblos Advanced Energy, which specializes in building, maintaining, and operating dual basis low-sulfur heavy fuel oil and liquefied natural gas electricity plants in Lebanon. Joumana Bassil Chelala and Mario Chelala have two children.

== See also ==
- Byblos Bank
- List of Banks in Lebanon
- Banque du Liban
- Economy of Lebanon
