= Semaan Bassil =

Lebanese businessman

- Born: September 5, 1965 (age 60)
- Education: Cambridge Judge Business School(M.B.M.), Boston University
- Occupations: Chairman/General Manager, Byblos Bank

Semaan Bassil (born 1965) is the chairman and general manager of Byblos Bank S.A.L., Lebanon's third largest listed bank, and chairman and general manager of Byblos Invest Bank S.A.L. He also sits on the boards of several Byblos Bank subsidiaries, and is a member of the Board of the Association of Banks in Lebanon (ABL).

== Early life and education ==
Bassil was born in Lebanon to François and Raymonde (née Al-Lati) Bassil, one of three children. His paternal grandfather was an entrepreneur who in 1950 founded the Société Commerciale et Agricole Byblos Bassil Frères & Co., a Lebanese company involved in natural silk and leather tanning, and in agricultural and consumer lending activities. The company became Byblos Bank S.A.L. in 1963.

Semaan Bassil's maternal family also came from a banking background, having been behind the establishment in 1924 of Banque LATI S.A.L., one of Lebanon's oldest banks.

In 1988, Bassil earned a Bachelor of Arts in Business, with a minor in Finance, from Boston University in the United States. He followed this in 1996 with a Masters in Business Administration and Management from the Cambridge Judge Business School at Cambridge University in England.

== Career ==
Bassil started his professional career in 1988, working for Fidelity Bank (later part of First Union Corp., which subsequently merged with Wachovia National Bank to become Wachovia Corporation, now part of Wells Fargo) in the United States. In 1989, he moved to Belgium, where he held the position of Credit and Country Marketing Officer at Byblos Bank Europe.

In 1992, Bassil returned to Lebanon, where he joined Byblos Bank S.A.L. as a Member of the Board of Directors, and was directly exposed to branch operations, retail and commercial lending, and finance activities, and later became member of the Management Credit Committee.

In 2000, he was elected vice-chairman of the board and general manager of Byblos Bank S.A.L. From 2000 until 2014, he held the following positions: chairman of the Board of Byblos Bank Syria, vice-chairman of the Board of Byblos Bank Africa, and Member of the Board of Byblos Bank Europe.

In 2015, Bassil was elected chairman and general manager of Byblos Bank S.A.L.

In 2017, Bassil was decorated as Officer of the Order of the Crown by H.M. King Philippe of Belgium in recognition of his services.

Bassil is a founding member of the Committee for the Restoration of the Lebanese National Library. He is also a former board member of both the Beirut Stock Exchange and the Beirut Traders Association.

== Publications ==
In addition to being a banker, Bassil is an avid collector of historical postal artifacts with abiding interests in archaeology and history. In 2009, he published a bilingual book titled “Soixante-dix ans d’histoire postale du bureau de poste français à Beyrouth (1845-1914)” (Seventy Years of Postal History at the French Post Office in Beirut [1845-1914]). In 2011, the book earned him a Gold Medal from the Chicago Philatelic Society. This was followed by an English-language volume, “French Postal History in Tripoli (1852-1914)”, in 2013. The preface to the latter was written by the president of the French Academy of Philately, renowned French postal historian Robert Abensur. In 2023, he published a new book titled "Mail in the Levant BEIRUT a case study in the early age of steamship & globalization (1835/1914)". The book examines Beirut, as a case study during Ottoman times when the emerging technologies of steam shipping and the modern postal system accelerated the flow of trade, knowledge, and travels.

== Personal life ==
Semaan Bassil is married to Nayla Bitar, with whom he has four children: François, Rami, Rhéa, and Karl.

== See also ==
- Byblos Bank
- List of Banks in Lebanon
- Banque du Liban
- Economy of Lebanon
- Joumana Bassil Chelala
