= Baizley =

Baizley is a surname. Notable people with the surname include:

- John Dyer Baizley (born 1977), American musician and painter
- Marnie Baizley (born 1975), Canadian squash player
- Obie Baizley (1917–2000), Canadian politician

== See also ==
- Bazley (disambiguation)
- Baisley
- Bailey (surname)
