= Atanas Slavov =

Atanas Slavov may refer to:

- Atanas Slavov (writer)
- Atanas Slavov (politician)
