= Basile =

Basile may refer to:

== People ==
=== Surname ===
- Adriana Basile (c. 1590–c. 1640), Italian composer
- Alfio Basile (born 1943), Argentine football coach and former player
- Arturo Basile (1914–1968), Italian conductor
- Emanuele Basile (1949–1980), captain of Carabinieri murdered by Cosa Nostra
- Ernesto Basile (1857–1932), Italian architect
- Fabio Basile (born 1994), Italian judoka
- Giambattista Basile (1566/1575–1632), Italian poet, courtier, and fairy tale collector
- Gianluca Basile (born 1975), Italian basketball player
- Gloria Vitanza Basile (1922-2004), American novelist and songwriter
- Gonzalo Basile (born 1974), Argentine boxer and truck driver
- Pierre Basile (died 1199), French knight who shot King Richard I of England with a crossbow at the siege of Châlus-Charbrol
- Rose Basile Green (1914-2003), American scholar, poet

=== Given name ===
- Basile Bouchon (fl. 1725), Lyon textile worker
- Basile M. Missir (1843-1929), Romanian politician

== Places ==
- Basile, Louisiana, United States
- Edmundston-Saint Basile, New Brunswick, Canada
- Pico Basilé, Bioko, the highest mountain of Equatorial Guinea
  - Pico Basilé National Park

== See also ==
- Basil (disambiguation)
- Vasily (disambiguation), in Cyrillic, the letter V is shown as a B
