= The Shining South =

Shining South or The Shining South may refer to the following books for Dungeons & Dragons:

- Shining South (2004 supplement), for v3.5e
- The Shining South (1993 supplement), for Advanced Dungeons & Dragons
