= Shaar =

Shaar (also written Al Shaar) is a surname. Notable people with the surname include:

- Bassel Al Shaar (born 1982), Syrian football player
- Edwin W. Shaar (1915–2001), American writer and graphic artist
- Hisham Al Shaar (born 1958), Syrian politician
- Mohammad al-Shaar (born 1950), Syrian military officer and politician
- Mohammad Nidal al-Shaar (born 1956), Syrian politician and economist
