= Vasiliu =

Vasiliu is a Romanian surname. Notable people with the surname include:

- Constantin Dan Vasiliu (1951–2020), Romanian politician
- Grigore Vasiliu Birlic (1905–1970), Romanian actor
- George Vasiliu, pen name of George Bacovia (1881–1957), a Romanian symbolist poet

== See also ==
- Vasile (name)
- Vasilescu (surname)
- Vasilievca (disambiguation)
