= Vasile Alecsandri (disambiguation) =

Vasile Alecsandri may refer to two villages in Romania, named after the poet and politician Vasile Alecsandri:

- Vasile Alecsandri, a village in Braniştea Commune, Galați County
- Vasile Alecsandri, a village in Stejaru Commune, Tulcea County

and to:

- Vasile Alecsandri National College (disambiguation), one of two high schools
