= Beirut Stock Exchange =

Stock exchange located in Beirut, Lebanon

- Logo
- Type: Stock Exchange
- Location: Beirut, Lebanon
- Coordinates: 33°53′39″N 35°30′18″E
- Founded: 1920
- Key people: Fadi Khalaf (chairman)
- Currency: United States dollar
- No. of listings: 15
- Website: http://www.bse.com.lb/

The Beirut Stock Exchange (BSE; Arabic: بورصة بيروت) is the principal and only stock exchange of Lebanon. Located in Beirut, it is a public institution run by a committee including a chairman, a vice-chairman and eight members appointed via a decree issued by the Council of Ministers, in accordance with a proposal by the Minister of Finance. All BSE members are Lebanese Joint stock companies (SAL) with a capital above £L500,000 and registered at the secretariat of the Commercial Register in. Members include holding companies and offshore companies. The BSE authorizes Brokerage firms the operation and trade in securities listed on the BSE according to the Bourse trading system and also lists the issuing companies (called "Listed companies") that have any of their stocks or other financial instruments listed. In January 2024 the market value of the Exchange was 20.4 billion USD.

== History ==
Beirut Stock Exchange, the second oldest market in the region, was established in 1920 by a decree of the French commissioner. Trading at that time was concentrated on gold and currency transactions, however in the 1930s there was an inflow of French, Syrian and local Lebanese investment which made it possible for the BSE to flourish, especially with the establishment of mixed Lebanese-French joint stock companies that were quoted simultaneously on the Paris and Beirut Stock Exchanges. The activity in the 1950s and 1960s increased with the enlisting of various banking, industrial and services companies along with an amount of 50 listed bonds.

The Lebanese Civil War broke out in 1975 and trading declined significantly until it was halted entirely in 1983. The suspension was meant to last two years, but only in 1994 the government established a new administrating committee (in collaboration with the Bourse de Paris) re-launched the BSE with a new internal bylaw, re-structured and streamlined mechanisms and trading systems. A new automated brokers system was introduced, based on the fixing price instead of the traditional OTC voice brokers. On November 22, 1996, the BSE officially re-launched the trading activity in its hall. The BSE and Bourse de Paris signed a cooperation agreement in June 1999 and the new European NSC-UNIX–Euronext system was set. In 2000, new forms of securities were listed such as GDR (Global Depository Receipt), investment funds shares, preferred stocks, priority shares and any other tradable derivatives. In late 2006, the BSE launched a new Remote Trading System, allowing the brokers to trade with the securities listed on the BSE "remotely" from their own offices.

In 2017 the Lebanese Council of Ministers issued a decree to privatize the BSE. The Cabinet approved in September 2017 a decree to establish the Beirut Stock Exchange SAL (BSE SAL) as a joint-stock company to replace the BSE.

== Hours ==
The exchange has pre-trading sessions from 09:00am to 09:30am and normal trading sessions from 09:30am to 12.30pm on all days of the week except Saturdays, Sundays and holidays declared by the Exchange in advance.

== List ==
The following companies are listed on the BSE:

Companies listed on the BSE
Sector	Issuer	Class	Number of Listed Shares	Type
Real estate	Solidere	A	100,000,000	Common
Real estate	Solidere	B	65,000,000	Common
Banking	Bank Audi		588,538,215	Common
Banking	Bank Audi		119,639,761	GDR
Banking	Bank Audi	H	750,000	Preferred
Banking	Bank Audi	I	2,500,000	Preferred
Banking	Bank Audi	J	2,750,000	Preferred
Banking	BLC Bank		71,033,333	Common
Banking	BLC Bank	D	750,000	Preferred
Banking	BLC Bank	E	263,510	Preferred
Banking	Bank of Beirut		20,796,417	Common
Banking	Bank of Beirut		4,762,000	Priority
Banking	Bank of Beirut	H	5,400,000	Preferred
Banking	Bank of Beirut	I	5,000,000	Preferred
Banking	Bank of Beirut	J	3,000,000	Preferred
Banking	Bank of Beirut	K	4,000,000	Preferred
Banking	Byblos Bank		565,515,040	Common
Banking	Byblos Bank		1,309,078	GDR
Banking	Byblos Bank	08	2,000,000	Preferred
Banking	Byblos Bank	09	2,000,000	Preferred
Banking	Banque Bemo		51,400,000	Common
Banking	Banque Bemo	2013	350,000	Preferred
Banking	BLOM Bank		215,000,000	Common
Banking	BLOM Bank		73,896,010	GDR
Trading	Rasamny Younis Motor Co.	B	10,920,000	Common
Manufacturing	Holcim Liban	Nominal	19,516,040	Common
Manufacturing	S. L. des Ciments Blancs	Nominal	9,000,000	Common

== See also ==
- List of Mideast stock exchanges
- Business in Lebanon
- Economy of Lebanon
