= Baisley =

Baisley is a surname. Notable people with the surname include:

- Jeff Baisley (born 1982), American baseball player
- Mark Baisley (born 1955), American politician

== See also ==
- Bailey (surname)
- Paisley (name)
- Baizley
