= BLOM Bank =

Lebanese bank

BLOM BANK
- Company type: Public
- Traded as: Beirut Stock Exchange
- Industry: Banking
- Founded: 1951
- Headquarters: Rue Verdun, Beirut, Lebanon
- Products: Credit cards, consumer banking, corporate banking, finance and insurance, investment banking, mortgage loans, private banking, private equity, savings, securities, asset management
- Number of employees: 2,363+ employees in Lebanon
- Website: https://www.blombank.com https://www.blomretail.com

BLOM BANK (Arabic: بنك لبنان والمهجر, French: Banque du Liban et D’Outre Mer, lit. 'Bank of Lebanon and Overseas') is a Lebanese bank established in 1951 and headquartered in Beirut. Providing banking services such as "commercial, corporate, private, investment, retail, Islamic banking, asset and wealth management, capital market services, and insurance products," BLOM Bank is one of Lebanon's largest banks and has its shares listed on the Beirut Stock Exchange and the Luxembourg Stock Exchange.

== History ==
BLOM BANK started operating in 1951 in Beirut. Its establishment coincided with a booming period in the banking sector in Lebanon. One of the founders was Hussein Al Oweini, a Lebanese politician and businessman. By 1953, BLOM BANK started expanding and opened a branch in Jeddah, KSA. As the Lebanese Civil War broke out, BLOM BANK’s operations abroad increased to cater for the needs of the Lebanese diaspora. Today, the group is present in 11 countries across the world. On the leadership level, the Syrian banker, Naaman Azhari, became the general manager of the bank in 1962 and chairman of the board and general manager in 1971. In 2007, Dr. Naaman Azhari was appointed chairman of BLOM BANK Group, and honorary chairman of BLOM BANK Group in 2020, while his son, Saad Azhari, became chairman of the board and general manager of BLOM BANK.

The bank adopted BLOM BANK as its brand name in 2000 and acquired the Lebanese subsidiary of HSBC Bank Middle East in 2017.

According to data from 2018, BLOM Bank is Lebanon's second largest bank by total assets behind Bank Audi.

In 2024, BLOM Bank was named as the petitioner in a case granted certiorari for review by the Supreme Court of the United States. This case, BLOM Bank SAL v. Honickman, relates to an incidence victims of Hamas and their family members suing BLOM Bank under the Justice Against Sponsors of Terrorism Act (JASTA) in 2019. The plaintiffs have alleged that BLOM Bank provided financial services to Hamas and is therefor liable for aiding and abetting acts of terrorism. The question before the Supreme Court of the United States is a dispute regarding the Federal Rules of Civil Procedure, specifically Rule 60(b) regarding judgment finality. Oral arguments were heard by the Supreme Court of the United States on March 3, 2025, and an opinion will be published before the Court's summer recess in July.

== Bank's network and subsidiaries ==
The Group conducts its worldwide operations through a network of banking and financial units, either directly or through its subsidiaries.

In January 2021 the company sold its Egyptian subsidiary to Bank ABC of Bahrain for $427 million.

== Sustainability ==
In terms of sustainability, BLOM BANK joined, in December 2014, the UN Global Compact committing to respect its ten principles, to take action in support of UN Goals and to submit annually a Communication on Progress Report.

At the corporate governance level, BLOM BANK was the first bank in the Arab World to sign the Investors for Governance and Integrity (IGI) Declaration, thereby committing to the implementation of the Governance and Integrity Rating guidelines and recommendations.

== Ownership ==
As of September 2023, BLOM Bank is primarily owned by The Bank of New York (34.37%), Banorabe S.A., SPF (18.73%), as well as the Azhari Family (7.53%), Chaker Family (4.83%), Saade Family (2.55%), Jaroudi Family (2.17%) and the Khoury Family (1.80%).

== See also ==
- List of banks in Lebanon
- Byblos Bank
- Audi Bank
- Economy of Lebanon
