= Vassil =

Vassil is masculine given name and a surname. Notable people with the name include:

- Anton Vassil, French film director
- Vassil Bebelekov (died 2016), Bulgarian-American bagpipe player
- Vassil Chilingirov (born 1951), Bulgarian Olympic sprint canoer
- Vassil Evtimov (born 1977), French-Bulgarian basketball player
- Vassil Kazandjiev (1934–2026), Bulgarian composer
- Vassil Tzankov (1905–1986), Bulgarian geologist and paleontologist

== See also ==
- Vasil, a masculine given name
