= Vasilievca =

Vasilievca may refer to several places in Moldova:

- Vasilievca, Dubăsari, a village in Cocieri Commune, Dubăsari district
- Vasilievca, a village in Sovetscoe Commune, Transnistria

== See also ==
- Vasile (name)
- Vasiliu (surname)
- Vasilescu (surname)
