= Vasilescu =

Vasilescu is a Romanian surname. Notable people:

- Alex Vasilescu - Romanian-American artificial intelligence researcher who developed a unified tensor framework for causal inference, in which computer graphics and computer vision problems were treated as conceptual analogues of forward and inverse causal inference problems.
- Gheorghe Vasilescu
- Laura Vasilescu (born 1984), Romanian handballer
- Leluț Vasilescu
- Lia Olguța Vasilescu (born 1974), Romanian politician
- Nicolae Vasilescu-Karpen (1870–1964), Romanian engineer and physicist
- Paraschiv Vasilescu (1864–1925), Romanian general in World War I
- Răzvan Vasilescu (born 1954), Romanian actor
- Tora Vasilescu (born 1954), Romanian actress

== See also ==
- Vasile (name)
- Vasiliu (surname)
- Vasilievca (disambiguation)
