= Bassel =

Bassel (Arabic: باسل) is an Arabic given name. It should not be confused with the French surname Bassil.

People with the name include:

== People ==
- Bassel al-Araj (1984–2017), Palestinian activist, author and pharmacist
- Bassel al-Assad (1962–1994), Syrian colonel, and politician, the eldest son of President of Syria Hafez al-Assad and the older brother of (later) President Bashar al-Assad
- Bassel Atallah, Syrian Canadian entrepreneur, co-founder of SSENSE
- Bassel Bawji (born 1989), Lebanese American basketball player
- Bassel Fleihan (1963–2005), Lebanese politician, legislator and minister
- Bassel El Gharbawy (born 1977), Egyptian judoka
- Bassel Jradi (born 1993), Danish-Lebanese football player
- Bassel Khaiat (born 1977), Syrian actor
- Bassel Khartabil also known as Bassel Safadi (1981–2015), Palestinian Syrian open-source software developer
- Bassel Mashhour (born 1982), Egyptian water polo player
- Bassel Al-Rayes (born 1979), Syrian-born Qatari handball player
- Bassel Al Shaar (born 1982), Syrian football player
- Bassel Shehadeh (1984–2012), Syrian Christian film producer and IT Engineer, activist

== See also ==
- Bassil
- Saint-Jean-de-Bassel, a commune in the Moselle department in Grand Est in north-eastern France
