= Wassily =

Wassily or Wassili is a masculine given name. It is a variant of the Russian name Vasily. Notable people with the name include:

- Wassily de Basil (1888–1951), Russian ballet impresario
- Wassily Gerassimez (born 1991), German cellist and composer
- Wassily Hoeffding (1914–1991), Finnish statistician and probabilist
- Wassily Jakowlew (1839–1908), Russian zoologist
- Wassily Kandinsky (1866–1944), Russian painter and art theorist
  - List of paintings by Wassily Kandinsky
- Wassily von Kwetzinsky (1898–1970), Russian-born Norwegian music critic and writer
- Wassily Leontief (1905–1999), Soviet-American economist
  - Wassily Leontief Prize
- Wassili Leps (1870–1942), Russian-born American composer and conductor
- Wassili Luckhardt (1889–1972), German architect
- Wassily Safonoff (1852–1918), Russian pianist, teacher, conductor and composer
- Wassily Sapellnikoff (1867–1941), Ukrainian-born Russian pianist

== See also ==
- Wassily Chair by Marcel Breuer
