= Shining South (2004 supplement) =

2004 role-playing game supplement

- Genre: Role-playing game
- Publisher: Wizards of the Coast
- Publication date: October 2004
- Media type: Print
- ISBN: 0-7869-3492-1

Shining South is a supplement to the 3.5 edition of the Dungeons & Dragons role-playing game.

== Contents ==
Shining South is an accessory for the Forgotten Realms that details the Shining South, consisting of the distant lands beyond the Lake of Steam and the Firesteap Mountains: Halruaa, Shaar, Luiren, and Dambrath.

== Publication history ==
Shining South was written by Thomas M. Reid, and published in October 2004. Cover art was by Sam Wood, with interior art by Wayne England, Sam Wood, Richard Sardinha, Carl Frank, Chris Hawkes, Jason Engle, Christopher Rush, Ralph Horsley, Vince Locke, and Mike Dubisch.

== Reviews ==
- Backstab #51

== See also ==
- The Shining South (1993 supplement), a 1993 supplement featuring the same fictional region for AD&D 2nd Edition
