= Atanas Slavov (writer) =

Bulgarian writer and art critic (1930 – 2010)

Atanas Slavov Атанас Славов
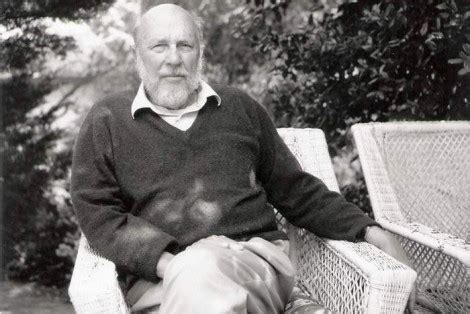
- Born: Atanas Vasilev Slavov; 25 July 1930; Sliven, Kingdom Bulgaria
- Died: 4 December 2010 (aged 80); Plovdiv, Bulgaria
- Resting place: Sliven, Bulgaria
- Education: Sofia University "St. Kliment Ohridski".
- Occupations: Writer, dissident

Atanas Vasilev Slavov (Bulgarian: Атанас Василев Славов, July 25, 1930 – December 2, 2010) was a Bulgarian writer, art critic, semiotician, poet, and screenwriter. He was a well-known public intellectual in Bulgaria and one of the prominent Bulgarian anti-communist dissidents of the 20th century, along with Georgi Markov.

An author of poetry, fiction, art history studies and much more, Slavov has received praise from Kurt Vonnegut and Graham Greene. At the beginning of 2016, Bulgarian National Television presented a film on the life and works of Slavov, coinciding with his 85th birthday, titled Atanas Slavov: The Man Who Put Bulgaria on the World Map. For his contribution to Bulgarian culture, Slavov was awarded the highest honor for a Bulgarian citizen: Stara Planina Order I in 2001.

== Biography ==
=== Early years and family ===
Slavov was born in Sliven on July 25, 1930, to Vasil Atanasov Slavov (1889–1980) and Penka Ruseva Slavova. Slavov was the youngest of three children, growing up alongside his older sisters Maria and Lilliana. Slavov was named after his paternal grandfather, Atanas Slavov (1860–1932), who was a lawyer and mayor of Sliven, as well as head of the Bulgarian Winemakers Association; his house in Sliven, built in 1930, is currently a landmarked building.

Slavov's father, Vasil, studied law in Belgrade and practiced in Sliven, before dedicating his time to co-found a Masonic lodge in the city; his interests spanned from Theosophy to Transcendentalism. In 1938, Vasil moved to Sofia and built his house in the Izgrev, Sofia district, popular with followers of the esoteric spiritualist Peter Deunov. The Slavov family were close to the spiritual leader Deunov and he often visited their home in the Izgrev district.

Vasil worked as legal counsel to his brother Kiril for the latter's varnishing factory (which was one of the first Bulgarian industrial enterprises to export to England) and alongside his brother-in-law Vladimir Atanasov, Vasil founded а flooring textiles factory in Omurtag (town). During the postwar hysteria and the establishment of the communist regime in Bulgaria, Vasil was wrongly accused of being an English intelligence officer and starting in 1953, he spent six years in jail as an enemy of the state. Meanwhile, his brother Kiril was arrested by Stalinists in 1948 for his efforts, alongside Traicho Kostov, to keep Bulgarian industrialism and export entrepreneurialism independent of the communist grasp. Kiril was also accused of working for English intelligence and in 1949, during an interrogation, he was killed by the Bulgarian State Security Service.

Vasil's personal library is now housed in New Bulgarian University in Sofia and includes over 3,000 tomes in English, Russian, French, German, and Esperanto.

=== Early career ===
Atanas Slavov initially enrolled at the American College of Sofia and attended until its closure in 1941. In 1953, he graduated from St. Kliment Ohridski University of Sofia with a specialization in English Philology.

From 1953 to 1965, Slavov worked various jobs. First, as an instructor of Russian linguistics for a set of courses organized by the United Committee for Bulgaro-Soviet Cooperation; second, as a librarian at the SS. Cyril and Methodius National Library; third, getting involved in various programmes on Radio Sofia; and finally, as a cartographer in the Rhodope Mountains.

From 1961 to 1971, Slavov taught English literature at St. Kliment Ohridski University of Sofia, where he delivered an assortment of lectures to his students – from seminars on the poetry and drama of the English Renaissance and England in the Middle Ages to courses on the British prose of the 19th and 20th centuries. During this time, Slavov successfully defended his doctoral degree at the Bulgarian Academy of Sciences on the dissertation topic of "Functions of Rhythm in Artistic Poetic Speech" (1965).

=== Peak career and move to the West ===
From 1966 to 1976, Slavov dedicated his time to working at the Institute of Art History at Bulgarian Academy of Sciences. While there, he established departments for design, informatics, and co-founded a group which focused on the study of Bulgarian Applied arts. Slavov also became a fellow specializing in Folklore and folkloric Art theory from 1974 onward.

From 1971 to 1976, Slavov co-founded and chaired as a member of the international group for comparative Slavic metrics at the Institute for Literary Sciences of the Polish Academy of Sciences in Warsaw.

In 1975, while at the Bulgarian Academy of Sciences, Slavov acted as executive on the project "Guidelines of World Culture Until 2000", in connection with which he went to the United States, which at the time was unprecedented for anyone in the Eastern Bloc. While in the US, and de facto labeled a Defection case by the Communist regime in Bulgaria, Slavov provided his expertise as it related to the "Guidelines" project at the International Research & Exchanges Board until 1976 in New York City.

Once in the West, Slavov's work took on many interesting forms. He spent time as a freelance author and speaker at Radio Free Europe/Radio Liberty and the BBC (London) in 1978. Then, in 1979, he consulted on Eastern European cultures at the Woodrow Wilson International Center for Scholars in Washington, DC. While in DC, Slavov also worked as a Bulgarian language instructor at the United States Department of State and at the Center for Linguistic Research in Maryland (1980–1983). Slavov's longest tenure proved to be his decade-long association with Voice of America in Washington, D.C. from 1980 to 1990, where he worked as a radio content writer, editor and broadcaster.

=== Later years and death ===
After 1990 and at the End of Communism in Bulgaria (1989), Slavov returned to his birthplace Sliven, where he remained for the rest of his life, taking on an active and much-loved role in the local community.

Slavov died aged 80 from complications during a routine operation on December 4, 2010, in a Plovdiv hospital.

== Work and influence ==
Slavov has authored poetry, science fiction, prose, memoirs, art history works, literary theory, literature criticism, historical and ethnographic research, children's books, screenplays for animated, documentary and feature films; he was also an expert English translator, translating the works of Graham Greene, Charles Dickens, and others into Bulgarian, often for the first time ever.

Slavov's art studies are presented in the books Copper Vessels (second volume of the series "Bulgarian Art Heritage", in which the author examines the development of coppersmithing in Bulgaria and the artistic features of copper products, published in 1974), Traditions and Perspectives in Bulgarian Applied Art, The Woodcarvings of the Rozhen Monastery, and others. Related to the Copper Vessels work and to commemorate Slavov's 90th birthday, New Bulgarian University held a posthumous exhibition in early 2020 called "Shields and Goblets"; in addition to portraits of Atanas Slavov by photographer Yordan Simeonov, Slavov's own photography was on display from Copper Vessels.

Slavov's literary-critical and theoretical research is present in the book "In the Shadow of the Ford Myth", where the author discusses the issue of the "outsider" in American literature (his philosophical and social nature, his presence in the work of hippies, Beatnik youth, and the so-called wandering generation, their aesthetics, and so on), as well as in publications on the problems of private methods of comparison and classification in artistic analysis, and of course in his dissertation.

In 1974, the Polish Academy of Sciences published Slavov's Essay on the Bulgarian Verse Composition (in Polish), in which with the help of the statistical method, Slavov tries to cover the Bulgarian verse tradition from the 9th century until the present day, and in 1987, his theoretical works were captured in the book Comparative Slavic Metrics (in Polish), which Slavov co-authored.

=== Memoirs and With the Precision of Bats (1986) ===
After leaving Bulgaria in 1976, Slavov began to write his memoirs, to which he owed much of his fame and notoriety in the West. The memoirs were written in English, but originally read out in Bulgarian (read by the author himself) in 52 weekly broadcasts on Radio Free Europe/Radio Liberty under the title Paths Under the Highways (1978–79). Later in 1983, the memoirs were published in Bulgarian under the title Overgrown with Grass by the Paris-based publishing house "Peev & Popov".

In 1986, the full version of the memoirs appeared in English (Occidental Press, Washington, DC) under the title With the Precision of Bats. Slavov's book, in which the particular political and cultural atmosphere of Bulgaria is recreated through the prism of autobiography and rich anecdote, won the Legerete International Writers Union Book award for best autobiography in 1986. The fate of the anti-communist and contra-Marxist memoirs in Bulgaria was radically different than their fate abroad, unfortunately. An investigation was launched against Slavov in 1978 by the Bulgarian government (investigation case No. 178) after the resumption of which in 1981 the author was sentenced to nine years in prison as an enemy of the state and political agitator. On February 1, 1991, the criminal case against Slavov was finally terminated, as the communist regime collapsed in Bulgaria.

=== Later works and interests ===
Slavov first published poems in 1962 in Literary News newspaper, which received public denunciation in Communist leader Todor Zhivkov's speech targeted at intellectuals on April 15, 1963. Slavov's poetic work after leaving Bulgaria found expression in the collections Poems 1962. Pornographic poem 1968 (published in Bulgarian in Munich, Germany), Mr. Lampedusa Has Vanished, and The Dough of America is Rising Me. In 1988, under the pseudonym Al Santana, Slavov published a grotesque parody called Handling Vegetables.

A return to the Bulgarian political and cultural reality came with the book The Thaw in Bulgarian Literature, which corresponded to the memoirs read earlier on Radio Free Europe. The 'thawing' of Bulgarian literature acquaints the English-speaking reader with the true nature of the processes in Bulgarian literary life, as seen by a public intellectual who provides an "insider's look".

Due to his family's upbringing in the Izgrev, Sofia quarter and his father's interest in and relationship with Peter Deunov, Slavov is the greatest researcher of the life and teachings of Deunov. In the US, Slavov toured and documented all the places where Deunov had lived during his studies there.

== Community involvement ==
Slavov was involved in various creative associations: the National Council for Industrial Aesthetics of Bulgaria (1972–1974), the Art Council of the Studio for Animated Films (1971–76), the American Association for the Promotion of Bulgarian Culture (co-chairman), the American Association for the Development of Slavic Studies (co-chair), American PEN Club, PEN Club of Writers in Exile – American branch, and the Institute of Diplomacy in Arlington, Virginia.

== Legacy and awards ==
In 2011, less than two months after the death of Slavov, the Department of New Bulgarian Studies at New Bulgarian University began to celebrate the writer's name day, January 18, as "Atanas Slavov Day" and commemorated the occasion with readings and small conferences held throughout the university's Sofia campus.

At the beginning of 2016, Bulgarian National Television presented a film on the life and works of Slavov, coinciding with his 85th birthday, titled Atanas Slavov: The Man Who Put Bulgaria on the World Map.

Slavov has been awarded the following:

- The highest honor for a Bulgarian citizen: Stara Planina Order I degree (2001)
- Dobri Chintulov Prize for literature
- the "Lie" award
- numerous Science Fiction Awards
- honorary citizenship of Sliven

Slavov received the following awards as a screenwriter for the films listed below:

- "Parade" (awarded at the Moscow International Film Festival in 1961, and in Oberhausen, 1965)
- "The Indigo Pirate" (awarded at the International Film Festival in Spain, 1974, and at the National Film Festival for Children's Films in Bulgaria, 1975)
- "Gerlovska Story" (two awards at the International Film Festival in Varna, 1971)

== Personal life ==
Slavov was married three times. His first wife was Sofia Philharmonic Orchestra violist Elisaveta Arnaudova, with whom he had one son (the poet Vasil Slavov); they were married in 1955 and divorced in 1960. Vasil's daughter, Ellie Slavova, is the founder of Thraix Group, an art collection agency based out of New York City specializing in Bulgarian art. Slavov's second wife was the writer and historian Vera Mutafchieva; they were married in 1961 and divorced in 1968. His third wife was Snezhana Dimitrova, with whom he had two children; Penka Slavova (Philadelphia-based educator) and Ivan Slavov (New Zealand-based video director). Snezhana Dimitrova and Slavov were married from 1969 until her death in 1984 in Washington D.C.

== Publications ==
Research and non-fiction

- Сливен. Градът на сукното и барута. 1962.
- В сянката на Фордовия мит. 1963.
- Жеравна. 1965.
- Прочее, нека моето слово... 1966.
- С иждивението на еснафа. 1966.
- Дърворезбите на Роженския манастир. 1968.
- От камък и дърво. 1968.
- Добри Желязков – Фабрикаджията. 1969.
- Zaris Wersyfikacji Bulgarskiej. 1974.
- Медни съдове. 1975.
- Традиции и перспективи в българското приложно изкуство. 1975.
- The „Thaw" in Bulgarian Literature. 1981.
- Светът на циганите: Кратка история. Светлина, 2002, 148 с. ISBN 9548850338
- Пътят и времето. Началото: Светска биография на Петър Дънов. София: Захарий Стоянов, 2009, 360 с. ISBN 9789547441040
- Изгревът. Към светската биография на Петър Дънов. Хелиопол, 2009

Literary works

- Нощите на Трентън. Роман. София: Изток-Запад, 2006, 182 с. ISBN 9543211175
- Квой туй дето му викате ЛЮБОВ. Разкази. Сливен: Я, 2008, 108 с. ISBN 9789548850728

Essays

- Оловното кълбо. 1991.
- Слънцето, ах вижте слънцето със костюма на квадрати. Сливен: Жажда, 2010, 136 с., ISBN 9789547952874

Memoirs

- С трева обрасли, 1983.
- With the Precision of Bats: The Sweet and Sour Story of the Real Bulgaria During the Last 50 Years, Occidental Press, 1986
- Пак заедно. Яворови до Елхови, 1991.
- С точността на прилепи, 1992.
- На Запад и на Запад, София, изд. Захарий Стоянов, 2006, 134 с., ISBN 9547298614

Science fiction

- По голямата спирала, 1965.
- Факторът „Х", 1965.

Poetry

- Стихове 1962. Порнографска поема 1968, 1981.
- Mr. Lampedusa Has Vanished, Occidental Press, 1982
- The Dough of America is Rising in Me, 1986
- Handling Vegetables, 1988.

Children's books

- Плюшеният мечо, 1967.
- Сивушко и Пънчушко, 1967.

Translations from English

- „Студеният дом" (1959) от Чарлз Дикенс (съвм. с Цветан Стоянов) – Charles Dickens
- „Нашият човек в Хавана" (1960) от Греъм Грийн – Graham Greene
- „Момчето от Джорджия" (1961, съвм. с Цветан Стоянов) от Ърскин Колдуел – Erskine Caldwell
- „Аз чукам на вратата" (1962) от Шон О'Кейси – Seán O'Casey
- „Велик род сме ние" (1962) от Уилям Сароян – William Saroyan
- „Абрахам Линкълн" (1963) от Карл Сандбърг – Carl Sandburg
- „Били лъжецът" (1966) от Кийт Уотърхаус – Keith Waterhouse

Selected works

- т.1: Големите кротки животни (поезия и есета). Сливен: БИС, 2003, 402 с.
- т.2: Луи Армстронг в страната на славеите (проза). Сливен: БИС, 2003, 420 с.
- т.3: Яворови до елхови (спомени и разговори). Сливен: БИС, 2003, 448 с.
- т.4: Тананикане на лакардиониста. Сливен: БИС, 2004, 407 с.

Works on Atanas Slavov

- Био-библиографски указател „Атанас Славов", под съставителството на д-р Росица Петрова-Василева, Регионална библиотека „Сава Доброплодни" – Сливен.
