= Macedonian Bulgarians =

Bulgarians from the geographic region of Macedonia

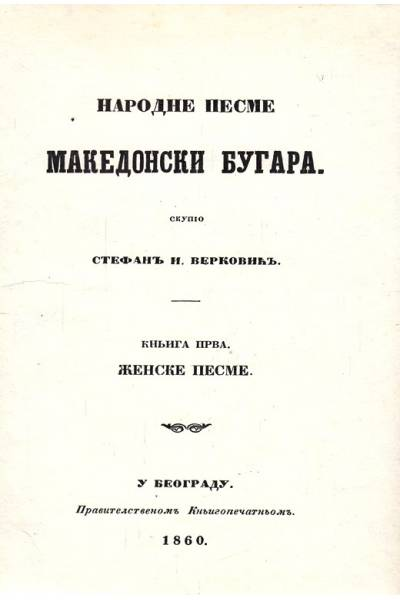
The cover of the book Folk Songs of the Macedonian Bulgarians, published in 1860 in Belgrade by Stefan Verković

Macedonians (Bulgarian: македонци), or Macedonian Bulgarians (Bulgarian: македонски българи), sometimes also referred to as Macedono-Bulgarians, Macedo-Bulgarians, or Bulgaro-Macedonians, are a regional, ethnographic group of ethnic Bulgarians, inhabiting or originating from the region of Macedonia. This is how the majority of Slavic-speaking population of Macedonia had been referred to by most of the national conscious minority among them and by outside observers, from the 10th until the early 20th century in a sense of a demonym at first, and later as a social class synonym mainly, and as an ethnonym. Since 1913, the Macedonian Bulgarian population is largely concentrated in Pirin Macedonia but much is spread across the whole of Bulgaria and the diaspora.

== History ==
=== First Bulgarian empire ===
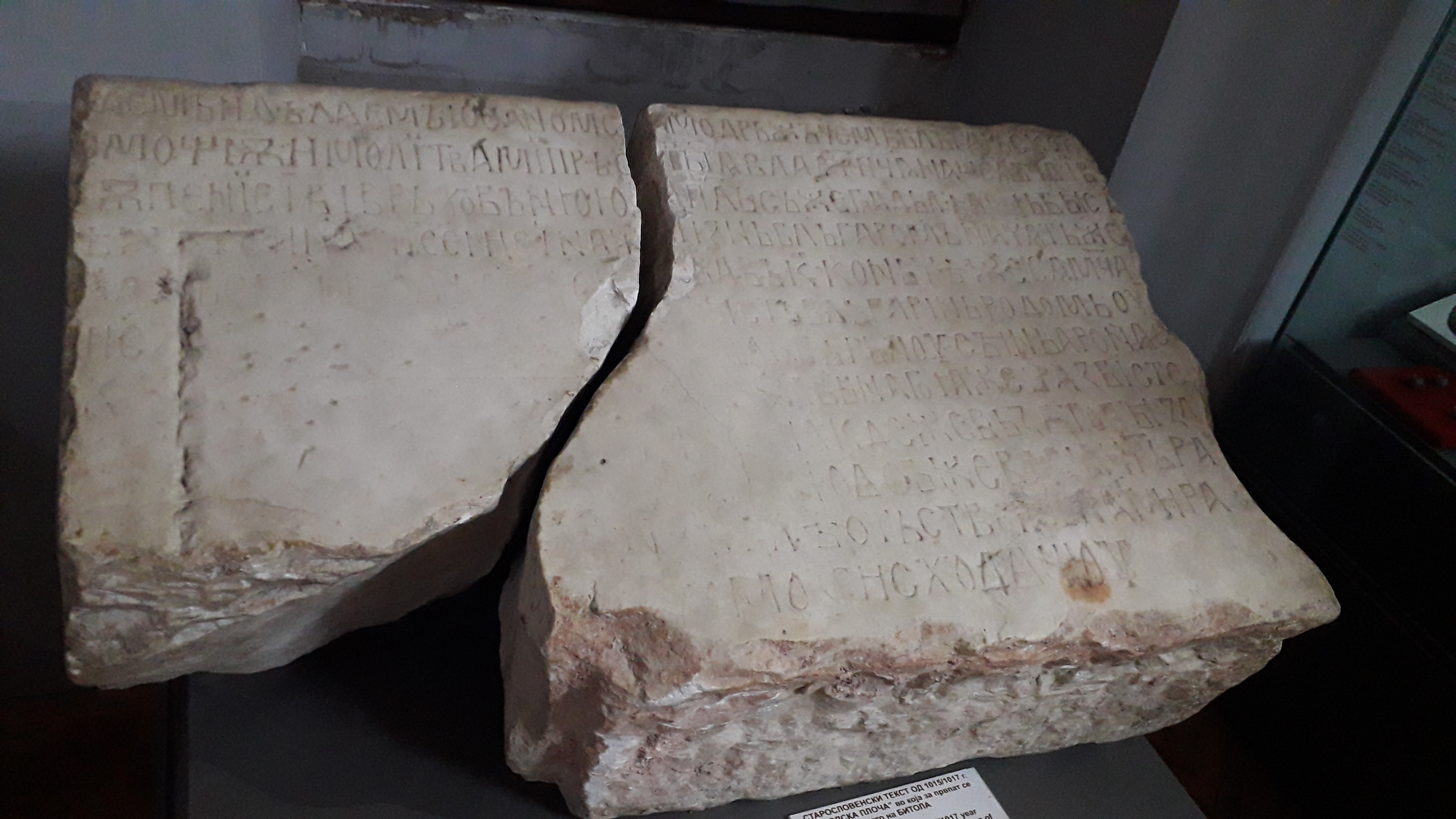
The Bitola inscription is a marble slab with Cyrillic letters of Ivan Vladislav from 1016. The text reports that he was Tsar of Bulgaria and Bulgarian by birth, and his subjects were Bulgarians.

=== Second Bulgarian empire ===
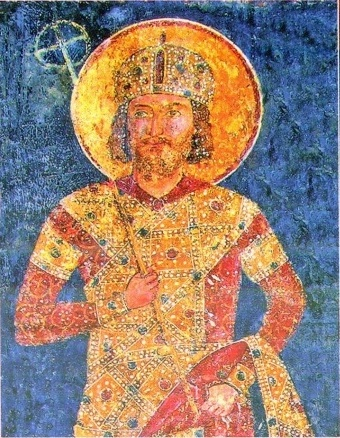
Portrait of the Skopjan Konstantin Asen who reigned as the tsar of Bulgaria (1257–1277)

=== Ottoman period ===
Girls in a Bulgarian Girls' High School of Thessaloniki, 1882

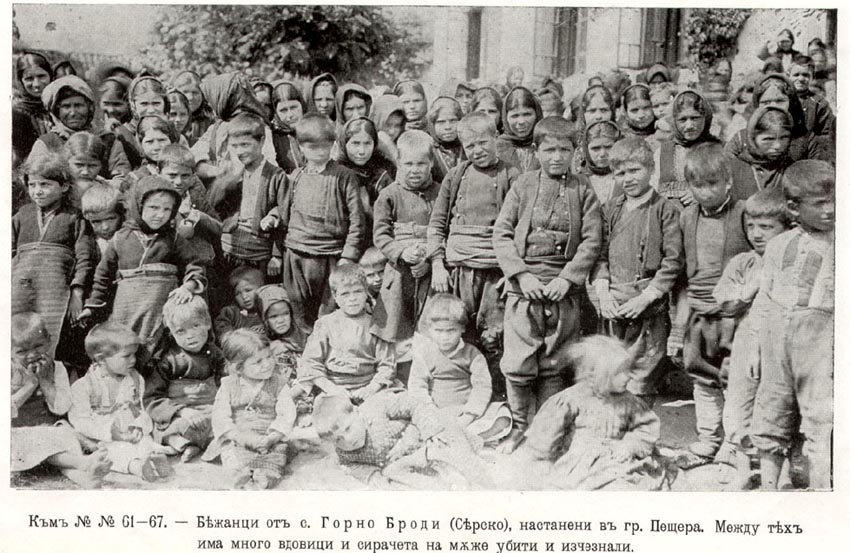
Bulgarian refugees from Southern Macedonia after the Second Balkan War

Local students in Skopje greeting the IMRO revolutionary Kosta Tsipushev by his return, after the Bulgarian annexation of Vardar Macedonia in 1941

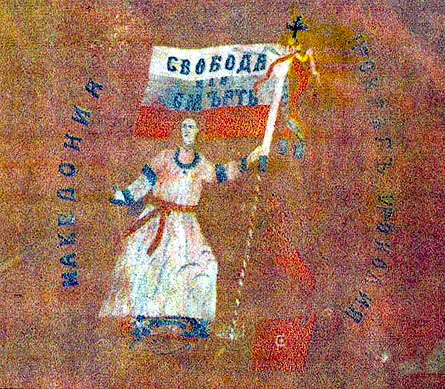
The banner of the Ilinden insurgents from Ohrid with Bulgarian flag on it and the inscription Свобода или смърть. The insurgents flew Bulgarian flags everywhere.

Per Apostolos Vacalopoulos, from the beginning of the 18th century, there is mention only of Bulgarians by the travellers in the area, which reveals they formed the largest Slavic community and gradually absorbed the sparse Serbian element here. In the 19th, during rise of nationalism in the Ottoman empire, the Slavs in Ottoman Macedonia began to acquire a mainly Bulgarian national identity, since until then, despite being known as Bulgarian by name, they were an amorphous mass in terms of modern nationalism. Until then, the word Bulgarian, generally had a social connotation of poor, Slav-speaking peasant, since most of the Slavic population lived in the rural parts of Macedonia and were mainly chiflik labourers.

With the rise of nationalism in the Ottoman Empire the classical Ottoman millet system began to degrade with the continuous identification of the religious creed with ethnic identity. In this way, in the struggle for recognition of a separate national Church, the modern Bulgarian nation was created, and the religious affiliation became a consequence of national allegiance. The semi-official term Bulgarian Millet, was used by the Ottoman Sultan for the first time in 1847, and was his tacit consent to a more ethno-linguistic definition of the Bulgarians as a separate ethnic group. Officially as a separate Millet were recognized the Bulgarian Uniates in 1860, and then in 1870 the Bulgarian Exarchists.

In the second half of the 19th century, rival Bulgarian, Greek and Serb nationalism used religious and educational institutions to "persuade" Macedonia's population that they are part of their respective nation. The establishment of the Bulgarian Exarchate in 1870 indicated a period of intense antagonism in Macedonia, mainly seen as expression of "national" consciousness of Macedonian Bulgarians. Unsurprisingly the majority of the Slavic population affiliated with the Slavic (Bulgarian) Church over the non-Slavic Greek one. Furthermore, opting for the Exarchate was far from being defined as nationally motivated, and with that as allegiance to the Bulgarian national cause. After the Russo-Turkish War, with the Treaty of San Stefano a Greater Bulgaria was created, including most of Macedonia in it. This decision was protested by Greece and Serbia, supported by Austro-Hungary and the United Kingdom, who were fearful of Russian influence spreading in the region through Bulgaria. Therefore, a new Treaty of Berlin was created and Macedonia was returned to the Ottomans. As a result, Bulgaria, Greece and Serbia in order to validate the territorial claims, started to compete for the allegiance of the Christian population of Macedonia, most of whom was without national consciousness, by implanting in them the "proper" national sense through the churches and schools. The absence of collective ethnic identity amongst the Macedonian Slavs meant that the different national movements were able to manipulate data and information in order to pursue their nationalist agendas. The functioning of the Bulgarian Exarchate then aimed specifically at differentiating the Bulgarian from the Greek and Serbian populations on an ethnic and linguistic basis, providing the open assertion of a Bulgarian national identity. However one basic distinction between the political agendas of local intelligentsias was clear. The Macedonian Greeks and Serbs followed, in general, the directives coming from their respective centers of national agitation, while by the Bulgarians the term Macedonian was acquiring the significance of a certain political loyalty, that progressively constructed a particular spirit of regional identity.

Contemporary travellers, ethnographers and linguists, including Slovak philologist Pavel Jozef Šafárik (1842), French geologist Ami Boué (1847, 1854), French ethnographer Guillaume Lejean (1861), English travel writers Georgina Muir Mackenzie and Paulina Irby (1867), Russian ethnographer Mikhail Mirkovich (1867), Czech folklorist Karel Jaromír Erben (1868), German cartographer August Heinrich Petermann (1869), German geographer Heinrich Kiepert (1876), Austrian diplomat Karl Sax (1877), etc. clearly identified the Slavs living in the part of Rumelia currently known as Kosovo as Serbs and only referred to the Slavs living in the Macedonia as Bulgarians. All of them also established the ethnographic boundary between Serbs and Bulgarians along the Šar Mountains. According to Encyclopædia Britannica, at the beginning of the 20th century the Macedonian Bulgarians constituted the majority of the population in the whole region of Macedonia, then part of the Ottoman Empire.

Although wearing the mantle of national ideology, the alignment of Macedonian Slavs to different national camps was not indeed belonging to an ethnic group, but rather political and flexible option. Contemporary observers used "party", "side" and "wing" when they wanted to denote different camps. Thus, this notion had not yet developed into a clear national identity in some non-Greek speaking parts of Macedonia. Furthermore, any expression of national identity among the majority of Macedonian Slavs was very superficial and was imposed by the educational and religious propaganda or by terrorism from armed bands. Many foreign observers who visited Macedonia assumed that the local Slavs speak Bulgarian, however more astute observers concluded that Macedonian Slavs linguistically were not Bulgarians nor Serbs. Per John Van Antwerp Fine during the 19th century, Macedonian was merely a regional term, while the Slavic Macedonians who had a clear ethnic identity, believed they were Bulgarians. However, ethnic identity existed among small number of educated people, while the peasantry lacked any strong identity and national debates were meaningless to their concern. Per Barbara Jelavich, an argument can be made that Macedonian Slavs were neither Bulgarians or Serbs, but the idea that they form a unique nationality of their own became significant after World War II. In the Principality of Bulgaria the ethnic Bulgarian identification developed into a national ideology meanwhile between Macedonian Slavs the meaning remained vague, which made the divergence grow, especially in Vardar Macedonia after 1913.

=== After the Balkan wars ===
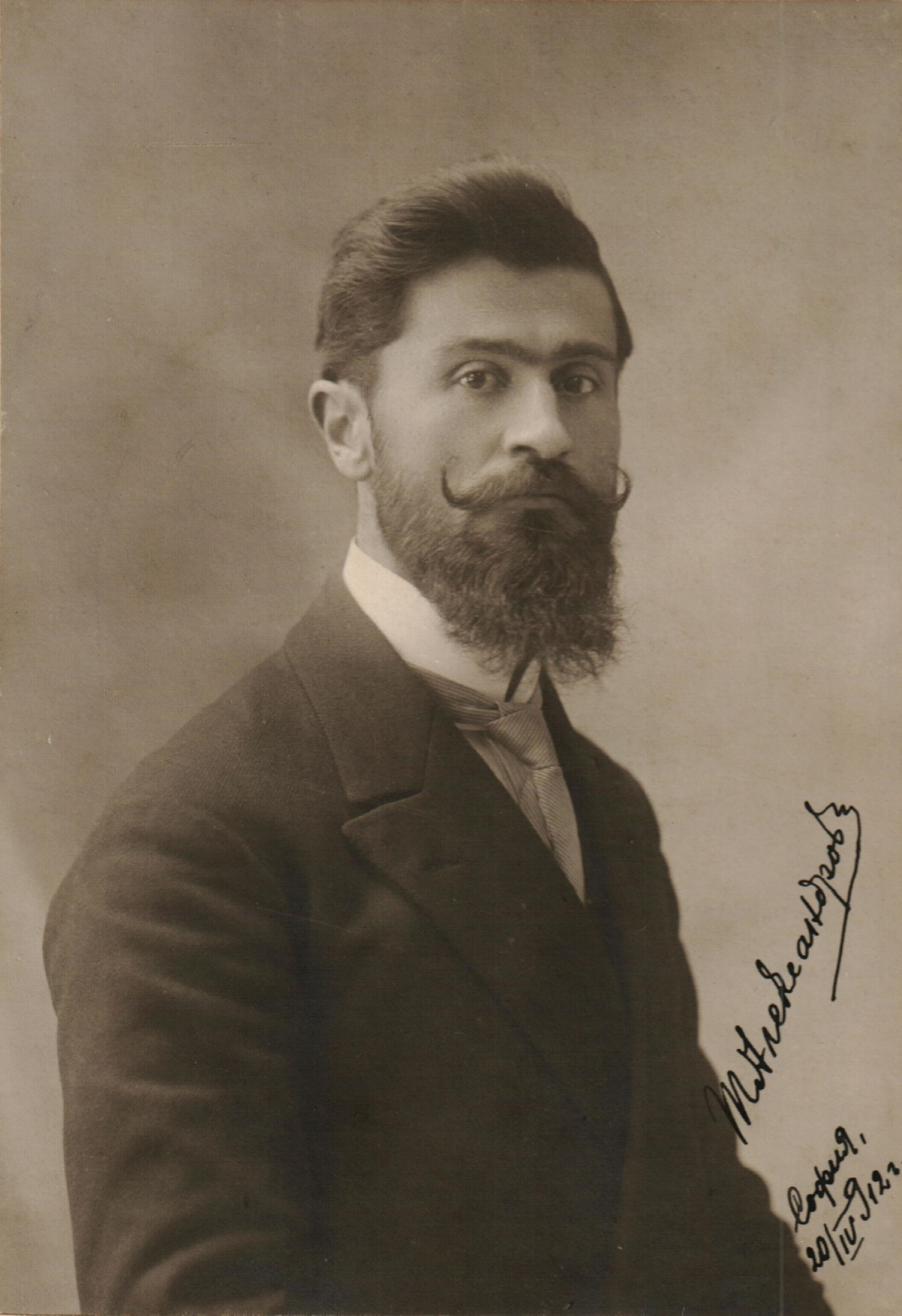
Todor Aleksandrov a notorious Macedonian Bulgarian revolutionary.

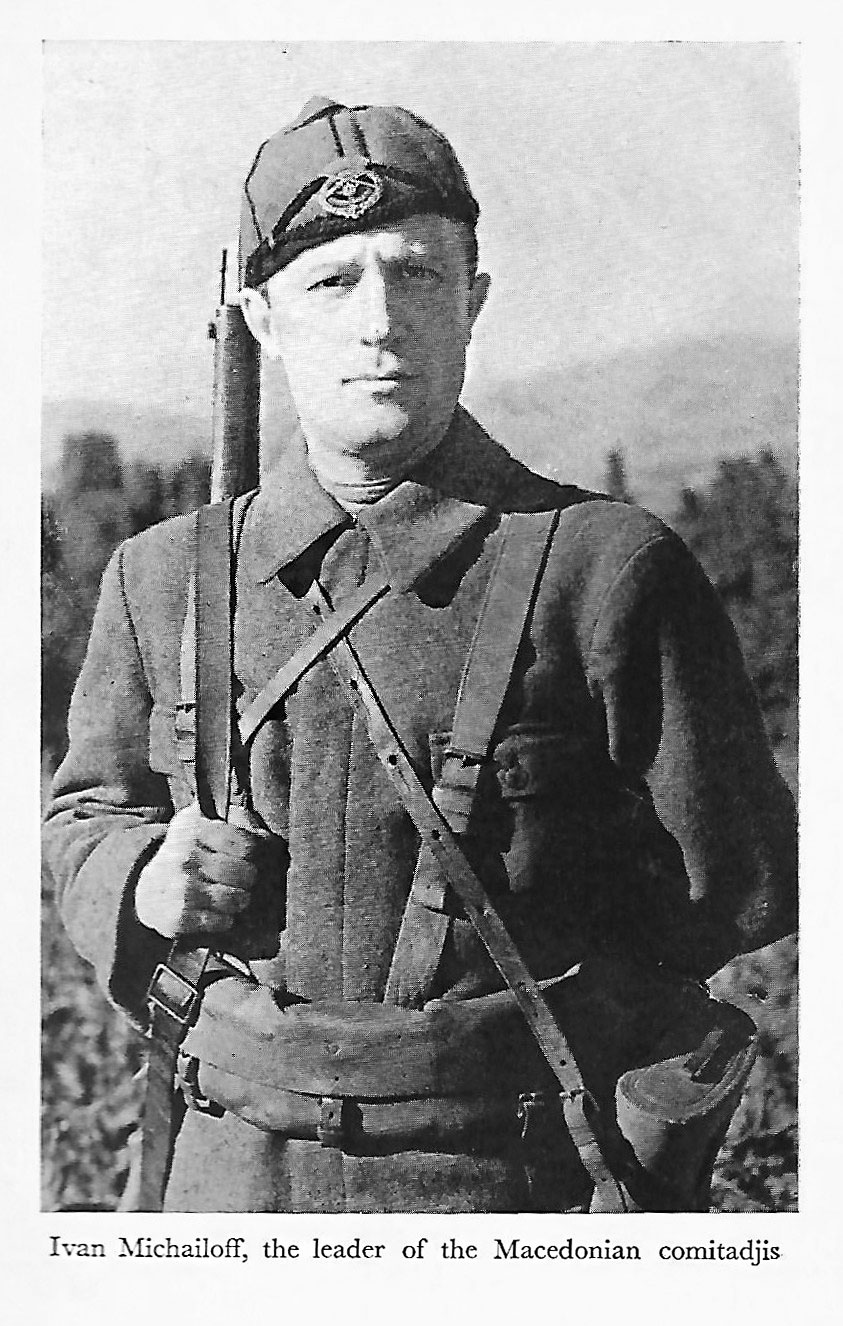
Ivan Mihaylov the last leader of the IMRO.

The Balkan Wars (1912–1913) and World War I (1914–1918) left Ottoman Macedonia divided between Greece, Serbia and Bulgaria and resulted in significant changes in its ethnic composition. All of the countries pursued a policy of trying to assimilate the inherited population. The immediate effect of the partition of Ottoman Macedonia were the nationalistic campaigns in areas under Greek and Serbian administration, which expelled Bulgarian churchmen and teachers and closed Bulgarian schools and churches. As a consequence a sizable part of the Slavic population of Greek and Serbian (later Yugoslav Macedonia), fled to Bulgaria or was resettled there by virtue of a population exchange agreements (Treaty of Neuilly-sur-Seine, Politis-Kalfov Protocol). Within Greece, the Macedonian Slavs were designated "Slavophone Greeks", while within Serbia (later within Yugoslavia) they were officially treated as "South Serbs". In both countries, schools and the media were used to disseminate the national ideologies and identities, and also the languages, of the new ruling nations, the Greeks and the Serbs. These cultural measures were reinforced by steps to alter the composition of the population: Serb colonists were implanted in Yugoslav Macedonia, while in Greek Macedonia, the mass settlement of Greek refugees from Anatolia definitively reduced the Slav population to minority status. In Serbian Macedonia any manifestations of Bulgarian nationhood were suppressed. Even in the so-called Western Outlands ceded by Bulgaria in 1920 Bulgarian identification was prohibited. The Bulgarian notes to the League of Nations, consented to recognize a Bulgarian minority in Yugoslavia were rejected. The members of the Council of the League assumed that the existence of some Bulgarian minority there was possible, however, they were determined to keep Yugoslavia and were aware that any exercise of revisionism, would open an uncontrollable wave of demands, turning the Balkans into a battlefield. Belgrade was suspicious of the recognition of any Bulgarian minority and was annoyed this would hinder its policy of forced "Serbianisation". It blocked such recognition in neighboring Greece and Albania, through the failed ratifications of the Politis–Kalfov Protocol in 1924 and the Albanian-Bulgarian Protocol (1932).

During the interwar period the foreign observers proceeded with describing the Macedonian Slavs as a nationally oblivious peasantry. However, in Vardar Macedonia a Macedonian national identity started growing. On the other hand, the political organization by the Slavic immigrants from the region of Macedonia, the Macedonian Patriotic Organization promoted the idea of Macedonian Slavs being Bulgarians.

=== Formation of a separate Macedonian national identity ===
Some researchers agree that the bulk of the Slavs in the region could not identify what they are, although certainly they were resentful to a Serbian identification, while some claim that they had a Bulgarian national identity until the early 1940s. As a whole the existence of an appreciable Macedonian national consciousness prior to the 1940s is arguable. When the Bulgarian troops occupied most of the area, they were greeted as liberators, pro-Bulgarian feelings among the local Slavic population prevailed in Greece and Yugoslavia. Although in Yugoslavia this was an effect from the previous suffering rule which had negative impact on the majority of the population. Also, in Greece afterwards efforts were undertaken by the Bulgarian authorities to instill in them a Bulgarian national identity. In Yugoslav Macedonia the Slavs were seen as "backward Bulgarians" and in an attempt to assimilate them an oppressive regime was established which as backlash stimulated the further development of a Macedonian national consciousness. After the Second World War and Bulgarian withdrawal, a Macedonian nation-building started within the newly formed Socialist Republic of Macedonia. According to political scientist Mirjana Maleska, the nation-building process was reinforced by strong Bulgarophobia, partly influenced by past hardships that Macedonians experienced as a result of certain nationalist and chauvinistic circles in Bulgaria. The new authorities began a policy of removing of any Bulgarian influence and supporting a distinct Macedonian national consciousness that would inspire identification with Yugoslavia. There were measures taken that would overcome the pro-Bulgarian feeling among the population. The overwhelming majority of the Slavic population in Macedonia accepted the emerging Macedonian national identity without a problem, and the establishment of the SR Macedonia fostered strong loyalty to the Yugoslav federation among the Macedonians. It has been claimed that from 1944 till the end of the 1940s people espousing pro-Bulgarian views had been oppressed. According to Bulgarian sources more than 100,000 men were imprisoned and some 1,200 prominent Bulgarians were sentenced to death. However, these figures have been questioned by some Bulgarian researchers, also noting that the assertion that these individuals were persecuted and killed solely on account of their Bulgarian national consciousness is deceptive. In Communist Bulgaria residents of Pirin Macedonia were encouraged to self-identity as Macedonians, so in the 1956 census there were 188,000 Macedonians listed. There are clear indications that the vast majority of the population from Blagoevgrad Province then was listed as ethnic Macedonians ex officio, by order of the authorities. A few years later, a complete turnaround occurred and the Bulgarian Communist Party began denying the existence of a Macedonian nationality. Therefore, the number of Macedonians decreased to below 10,000 in 1965 and eventually, in an assimilation gesture, they were erased from the statistical data. As a result the rest of Macedonian Slavs, with exception of Bulgarian Macedonia, proceeded to identify as ethnic Macedonians or were Hellenized.

Nevertheless, people with Bulgarian consciousness or Bulgarophile sentiments still live in North Macedonia and Greece. After the European Union membership of Bulgaria, more than 50,000 Macedonians applied for Bulgarian citizenship. In order to obtain it they must sign a statement declaring they are Bulgarians by origin. As of 2024, more than 120,000 Macedonian nationals have already received Bulgarian citizenship. However, this phenomenon is primarily caused by economic reasons because the Bulgarian passport, contrary to the Macedonian one, allows free entry to EU states and the right to seek employment. The passports are issued at a cost of several hundred euros and there have been reports of abusing this practice where Macedonian notaries use it as opportunity for corrupt earnings by submitting false declarations on their clients behalf in which they declare Bulgarian origin of their parents.

== See also ==
- List of Macedonian Bulgarians
- Bulgarians in Albania
- Internal Macedonian Revolutionary Organization
- Macedonia (terminology)
- Thracian Bulgarians
