= Vasyl Vasyltsiv =

Ukrainian singer and composer (born 1987)

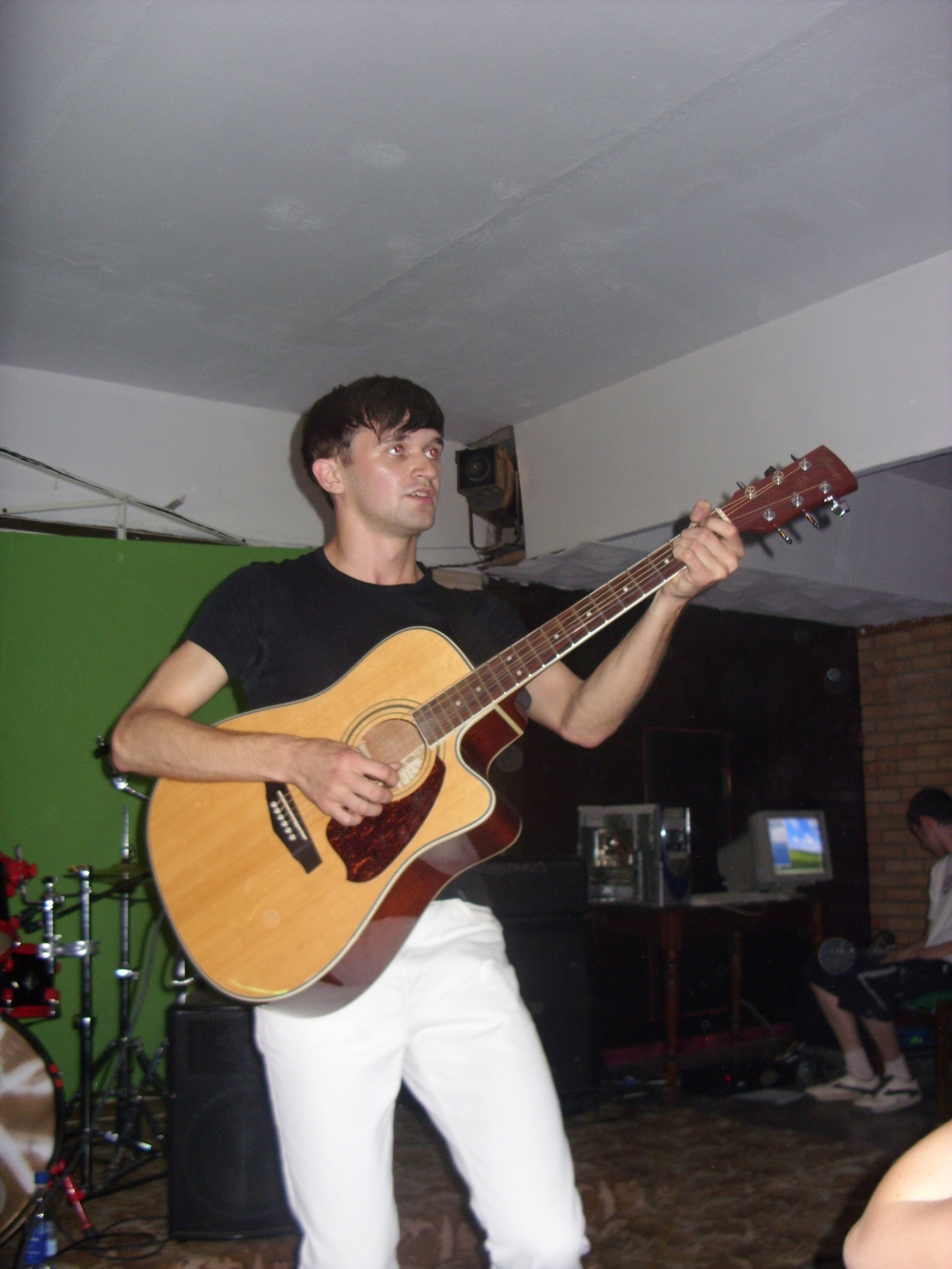
- Born: Василь Васильців; June 26, 1987 (age 38); Lviv
- Occupation: Singer
- Musical career
- Instrument: Vocals

Vasyl Vasyltsiv (Ukrainian: Василь Васильців; born 26 June 1987) is a Ukrainian singer and composer.

Vasyl Vasyltsiv was born on 26 June 1987 in Lviv. In spite of his young age, since writing his first song in 2001 Vasyltsiv has released nine albums (as of May 2008). Though only one of them came under official label (Goldenhits) Vasyltsiv is sometimes considered as "the face of Ukrainian underground" and "genius of pure simplicity".

Having graduated with honors as a "performer and orchestra conductor" Vasyltsiv is yet frequently being criticised for tone deafness, lack of vocal abilities and composing talent. While being regarded as simple and naïve, Vasyltsiv's music is distinguished for its harmony and proportion.
