= Basil Favis =

Basil D. Favis is a full professor in Department of Chemical Engineering, Ecole Polytechnique de Montreal and the director of Center for Research on High Performance Polymer and Composite Systems (CREPEC). Favis is the author or co-author of more than 170 scientific papers and is one of the most highly cited authors in the polymer/biopolymer blends field. In 1995 Favis was the recipient of the Syncrude Canada Innovation Award of the Canadian Society for Chemical Engineering. He is the past chairman of the Macromolecular Science and Engineering Division of the Chemical Institute of Canada, a Fellow of the Chemical Institute of Canada, a Fellow of the Society of Plastics Engineers, a member of the Quebec Order of Engineers and in 1997-1998 was the Invited Professor at the University of Strasbourg in France.

Favis received his Ph.D. in Polymer Physical Chemistry from McGill University in Montréal, Quebec, Canada. After a period in industry as a group leader with Johnson and Johnson Inc. he worked as program manager for polymer blends with the Industrial Materials Institute of the National Research Council of Canada. Since 1990 he has been a professor in the Department of Chemical Engineering at the Ecole Polytechnique de Montréal.
