= István Basilius =

Hungarian Unitarian and minister

István Basilius (1549–1581) was a Hungarian Unitarian and first minister at Nagyvárad, now part of Romania.

In 1670 he published, along with fellow ministers György Enyedi and Máté Toroczkai, the text Explicationes locorum Veteris et Novi Testamenti, ex quibus Trinitatis dogma stabiliri solet. Its title translates to "explanations of the passages of the Old and New Testaments, from which the doctrine of the Trinity is usually established."
