= Vasile Alecsandri National College =

Vasile Alecsandri National College (Romanian: Colegiul Național "Vasile Alecsandri") may refer to one of two educational institutions in Romania:

- Vasile Alecsandri National College (Bacău)
- Vasile Alecsandri National College (Galați)
