= Krastyo Hadzhiivanov =

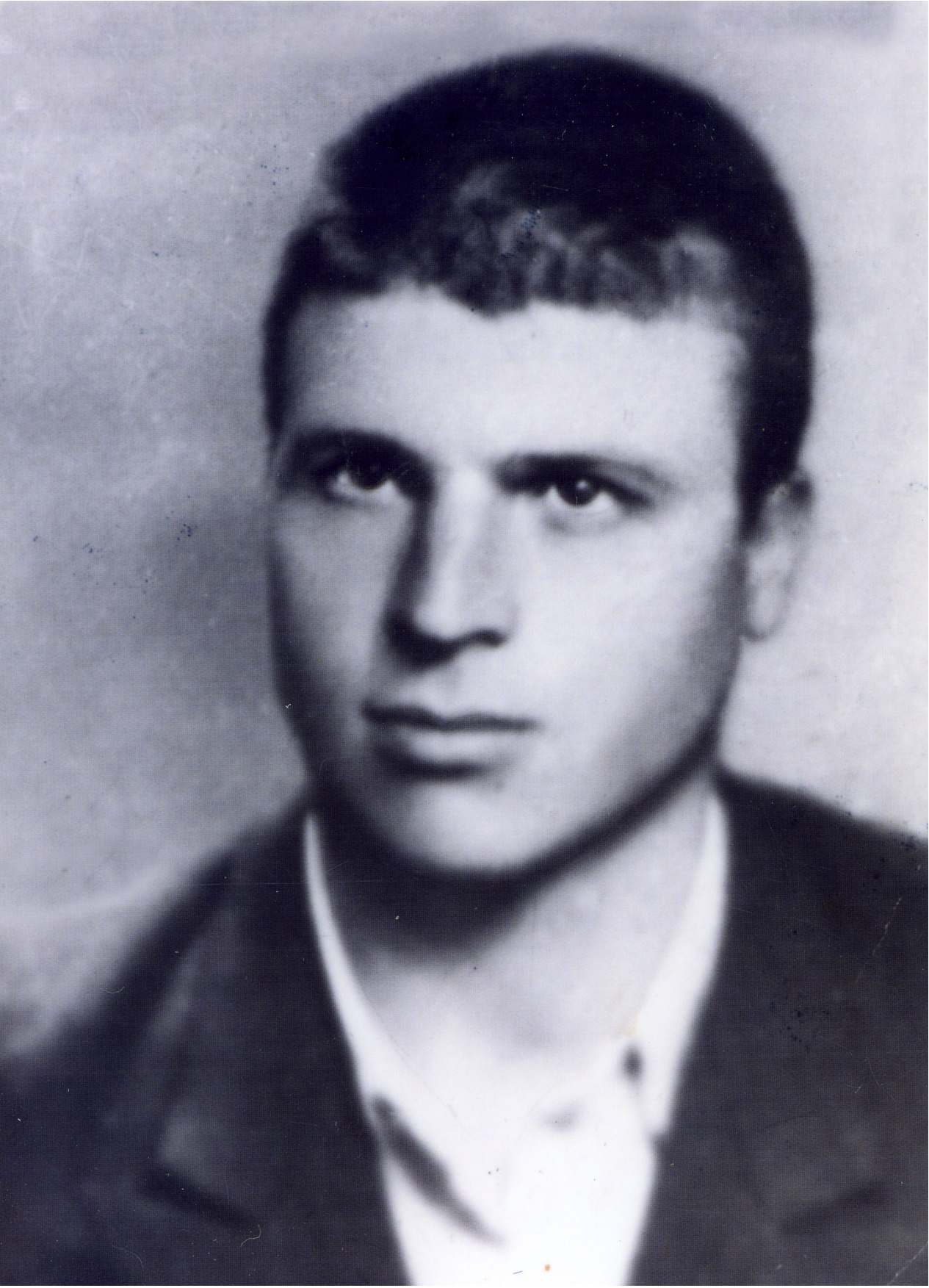
Krastyo Hadzhiivanov.

Krastyo Hadzhiivanov (December 25, 1929 – June 27, 1952) was a Bulgarian poet and resistance fighter.

== Early life ==
Hadzhiivanov was born in Kapatovo, in the Petrich district of Bulgaria. He began composing poetry when he was six years old.

During World War II, aged 14, he joined the resistance against the Nazis. Hadzhiivanov was involved in smuggling weapons to guerrillas who had been abandoned at the Metaxas Line in Greek Macedonia, a task which involved navigating a dangerous route through mine fields and around Nazi check points. Meanwhile, the young teenager recited poetry at meetings with villagers all over the Serres region.

After Bulgaria's successful coup on 9 September 1944, the new communist government offered to send Hadzhiivanov to study literature in Moscow. He refused, with the words, "Moscow is too close to Siberia", referring to Joseph Stalin's Gulags.

Local communist authorities perceived Hadzhiivanov as a threat; he was persecuted for his democratic and humanistic beliefs, and mistreated during his studies at secondary school. He was later sent to the uranium mines at Seslavci village, where he was mistreated and beaten. During a strike in the mine, a friend of his was brutally killed.

Hadzhiivanov succeeded in escaping from the mines and fled to the Pirin Mountains, aiming to cross the Iron Curtain illegally and escape to Greece. He was killed in an ambush at the border on June 27, 1952, at the age of 22. At the time, Bulgarian State Security stated that he was presumed to be a Greek diversionist. His body was thrown in the swamps around the Struma River.

== Legacy ==
Hadzhiivanov's poetry was written before 1950 and hidden by his friends from communist State Security services, before later being sent abroad to be published. A small memorial was placed at the site of his death in 1999 under the auspices of the Bulgarian vice-president Todor Kavaldzhiev. A ceremony was held on the 70th anniversary of his birth. For the 80th anniversary in 2009, an Initiative Committee was established under the chairmanship of fellow Bulgarian poet Evtim Evtimov.
