= BLC Bank =

Lebanese financial institution

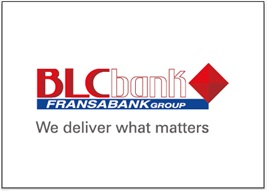
- Type: Joint Stock Company
- Traded as: BSE Ticker LB: BLC; Reuters Code: BLCB
- Industry: Bank
- Founded: 1950 in Beirut, Lebanon
- Headquarters: BLC Bank Building, Adlieh, Beirut, Lebanon
- Key people: Raida Daouk (Chairman) Nadim Kassar (Delegated Board Member); Mansour Bteich (General Manager) Hani Dannawi (DGM)
- Products: Retail, Corporate, Private & Digital Banking
- Number of employees: 376 (2026)
- Subsidiaries: BLC Services SAL
- Website: BLCBank.com

BLC Bank SAL (BLC:LB) is a Lebanese financial institution offering banking, insurance and asset management services. BLC Bank subsidiaries: BLC Services SAL.

BLC Bank SAL is a Lebanese joint stock company registered under No.1952 in the Lebanese Commercial Register.

== Historical overview ==
BLC Bank was founded in the early 1950s in Beirut by the Abou Jaoudeh family. It was previously named Banque Libanaise pour le Commerce, renamed to BLC Bank in the end of 2004.

By the end of 2004, BLC Bank (renamed as part of the complete process of restructuring and recapitalization) occupied the 12th spot among the largest banks in Lebanon in terms of assets and customer deposits. BLC was the first bank in Lebanon to provide micro credit loans focusing on the small enterprises as a main business line.

During this same year, the Bank entered the insurance market and created a fully owned subsidiary, BLC Services SAL, to handle this business.

In August 2007, Fransabank SAL, the fourth largest banking institution in Lebanon, acquired from the Qatar Investment Authority (QIA) 97.52% of the capital of BLC Bank SAL after the latter had finalized the successful sell off of its French subsidiary, BLC Bank SAL (France) to QIA. As a result of this, BLC Bank SAL Lebanon ceased to have any shareholding in BLC Bank SAL (France)

== Shareholder structure ==
BLC Bank's shareholding structure is as follows:

- Fransabank S.A.L. – 96.13%
- BLC Treasury Shares – 1.99%
- Other shareholders – 1.88%

BLC Bank S.A.L. holds a 90.67% ownership stake in BLC Services S.A.L.
