= Wasilewski =

Wasilewski (femine: Wasilewska) is a Polish surname, it may refer to:

- Adam Wasilewski (born 1949)
- Audrey Wasilewski (born 1967), American actress and voice actress
- Carolyn Wasilewski (1940–1954), victim of an unsolved 1954 murder in Baltimore, Maryland
- Edward Wasilewski (1923–1968), Polish anti-communist fighter
- Erika Lauren Wasilewski, an American radio personality, singer-songwriter, and former reality television personality
- Ewa Wasilewska (born 1967), Polish speed skater
- Henryk Wasilewski (1953–2012), Polish middle-distance runner
- Justyna Wasilewska (born 1985), Polish actress
- Leon Wasilewski (1870–1936), Polish politician
- Małgorzata Wasilewska (born 1960), Polish human rights activist and diplomat
- Marcin Wasilewski (born 1980), Polish footballer
- Mieczysław Wasilewski (born 1942), Polish graphic designer
- Nicholas Wasilewski, video-game developer
- Paul Wasilewski (born 1982), Polish-American actor
- Peter "JR" Wasilewski (born 1976), American saxophonist
- Regina Wasilewska-Kita (born 1951), Polish politician
- Tomasz Wasilewski (born 1980), Polish film director and screenwriter
- Wanda Wasilewska (1905–1964), Polish communist writer
- Zygmunt Wasilewski, Polish politician

== See also ==
- Mount Wasilewski
- Vasilevsky (disambiguation)
