= Basil Gomez =

Anglo-American geomorphologist (born 1955)

- Born: 1955 (age 70–71)
- Education: University of Plymouth; University of Southampton
- Scientific career
- Fields: Geomorphology
- Workplaces: University of Oxford (1987); Jesus College, Oxford (1987); St Catherine's College, Oxford (1987); Indiana State University; University of Hawaiʻi

Basil Gomez (born 1955) is an Anglo-American geomorphologist with a particular interest in fluvial processes and the sources, transport and sinks of riverine sediment and particulate matter.

Educated at Maidstone Technical High School for Boys (now Oakwood Park Grammar School), he studied geography at Plymouth Polytechnic (now the University of Plymouth), and obtained his Ph.D. in geography from the University of Southampton in 1981.

Before entering the private sector as a consultant, he taught at Jesus and St Catherine's colleges, University of Oxford (1982–1987) and Indiana State University (1988–2010), and is an adjunct professor in the Department of Geography and Environment, University of Hawaiʻi at Mānoa.

He received a Royal Society University Research Fellowship in 1981, was awarded the degree of Doctor of Science by the University of Southampton in 2005, received the Grove Karl Gilbert Award from the Geomorphology Specialty Group of the Association of American Geographers (AAG) in 2007, and was named an AAG Fellow in 2020.
