= Vasily =

Vasili, Vasily, Vasilii or Vasiliy (Russian: Василий) is a Russian masculine given name of Greek origin and corresponds to Basil. It may refer to:

- Vasily I of Moscow Grand Prince from 1389–1425
- Vasily II of Moscow Grand Prince from 1425–1462
- Vasili III of Russia Grand Prince from 1505–1533
- Vasili IV of Russia Tsar from 1606–1610
- Basil Fool for Christ (1469–1557), also known as Saint Basil, or Vasily Blazhenny
- Vasily Alekseyev (1942–2011), Soviet weightlifter
- Vasily Arkhipov (1926–1998), Soviet Naval officer in the Cuban Missile Crisis
- Vasily Boldyrev (1875–1933), Russian general
- Vasily Chapayev (1887–1969), Russian Army commander
- Vasily Chuikov (1900–1982), Soviet marshal
- Vasily Degtyaryov (1880–1949), Russian weapons designer and Major General
- Vasily Dzhugashvili (1921–1962), Stalin's son
- Vasili Golovachov (born 1948), Russian science fiction author
- Vasily Grossman (1905–1964), Soviet writer and journalist
- Vasily Ignatenko (1961–1986), Soviet firefighter in the aftermath of the Chernobyl disaster
- Vasilii Alekseevich Iskovskikh (1939–2009), Russian mathematician
- Vasily Kuznetsov (1901–1990), Soviet politician, acted three times as head of state of USSR
- Vasyl Ivanchuk (born 1969), Ukrainian chess grandmaster
- Wassily Kandinsky (Vasily Kandinsky; 1866–1944), Russian painter and art theorist.
- Vasily Karatygin (1802–1880), Russian actor
- Vasily Lanovoy (1934–2021), Russian actor
- Vasily Livanov (born 1935), Russian actor and screenwriter
- Vasily Lobanov (born 1947), Russian composer and pianist
- Vasyl Lomachenko (Vasily Lomachenko; born 1988), Ukrainian boxer
- Vasily Markovich (born 1955), Belarusian politician
- Vasily Nezabitovsky (1824–1883), Ukrainian jurist
- Vasily Petrenko (born 1976), Russian conductor
- Vasily Podkolzin (born 2001), Russian ice hockey player currently playing for the Edmonton Oilers
- Vasily Seseman (1884–1963), Russian and Lithuanian philosopher
- Vasily Smyslov (1921–2010), Soviet chess player
- Vasily Tsibliyev (born 1954), Russian cosmonaut
- Vasily Zaytsev, Soviet sniper
- Vasily Zakharov (1934–2023), Soviet culture minister
- Vasily Zhdanov (born 1963), Soviet cyclist

== Fictional characters ==
- Vasilii, a character from the Twilight book and film series
- Vasily Borgov, a character from the novel The Queen's Gambit by Walter Tevis and in the Netflix miniseries of the same title based on the novel
- Vasily Petrovych Goloborodko, protagonist of the TV series Servant of the People
- Vasily Lantsov, a character from the Grishaverse book series by Leigh Bardugo
- Vasily Pavlichenko, a character from Satoru Noda's seinen manga series, Golden Kamuy

== See also ==
- Wassily
- Wassily Chair, 1920s furniture, named after Wassily Kandinsky (Vasily Kandinsky)
- Vasilyev, surname
- Vasyl, (Ukrainian: Василь), Ukrainian masculine given name
- Vasil (Bulgarian and Macedonian: Васил, Georgian: ვასილ), Bulgarian, Macedonian and Georgian masculine given name
- Vasilisa (name), the feminine form of the name
