= Byblos Bank =

Lebanese bank

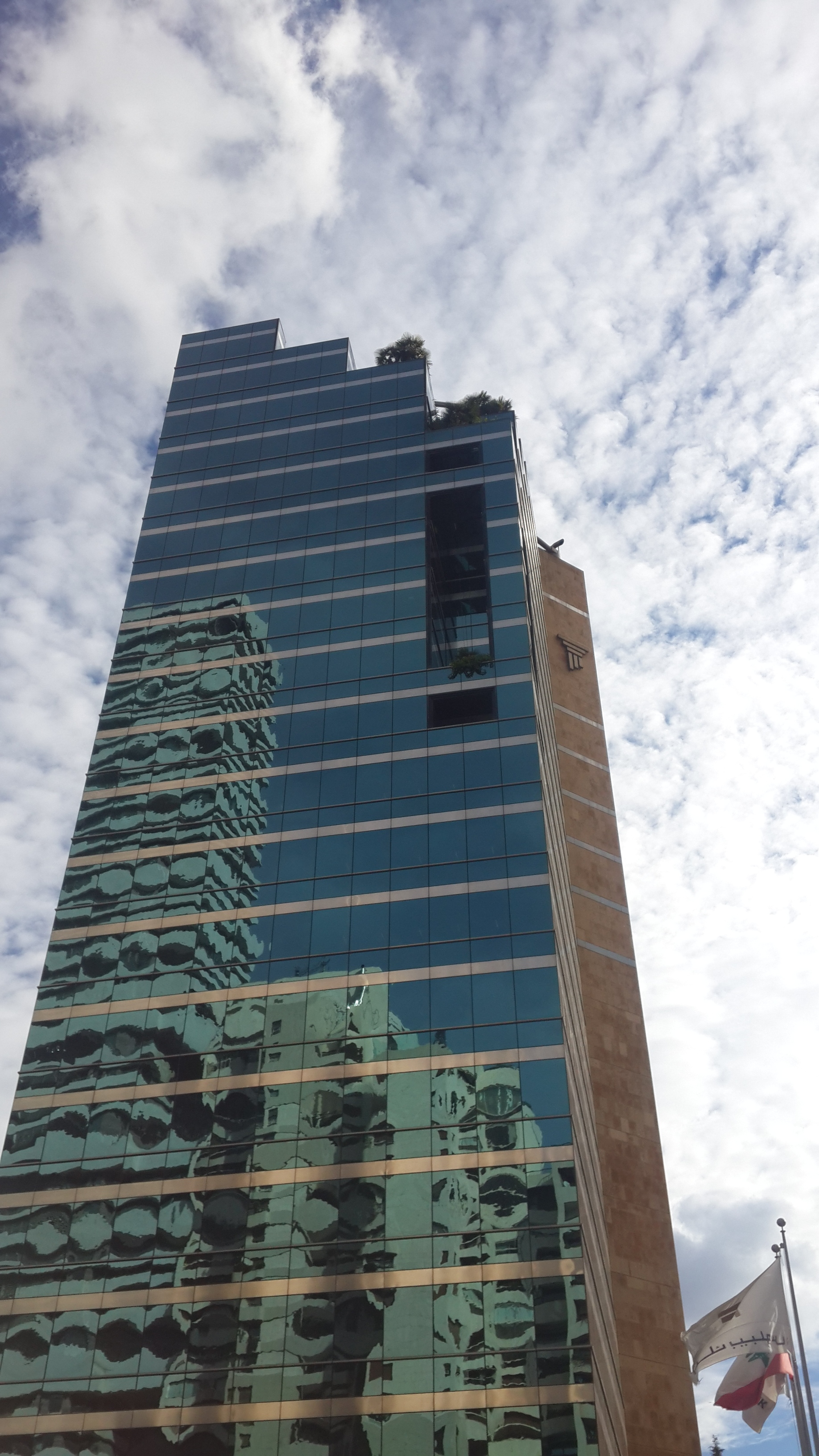
- The headquarters of Byblos Bank in Beirut
- Type: Société anonyme libanaise
- Traded as: BYB (BSE); BYB (LSE)
- Industry: Banking, Financial services
- Founded: 1963 (current); 1950 as Société Commerciale et Agricole Byblos Bassil Frères & Co.
- Founders: Semaan Melkan Bassil, Youssef Melkan Bassil, Victor Fernainé, Fouad Fernainé
- Headquarters: Byblos Bank building Elias Sarkis Avenue; Beirut, Lebanon
- Area served: Africa, Europe, Middle-East
- Key people: Semaan Bassil (Chairman and General Manager)
- Products: Consumer banking, Commercial banking, Correspondent banking, Capital markets
- Net income: ▲US$ 170.1 million (2017)
- Total assets: ▲US$ 22.7 billion (2017)
- Total equity: ▲US$ 2.16 billion (2017)
- Number of employees: 2,524 (2016)
- Subsidiaries: Byblos Bank Europe; Byblos Bank Armenia; Byblos Bank Syria; ADIR Insurance and Reinsurance
- Website: www.byblosBank.com

Byblos Bank (Arabic: بنك بيبلوس) is a Lebanese bank established in 1963 and headquartered in Beirut, Lebanon. It is the country's third largest bank by assets. It is one of the Alpha banks in Lebanon, along with Banque Libano-Française S.A.L., Bank Audi, BLOM Bank, and Fransabank, which are its main competitors. As at 31 July 2018, it operates 88 branches in Lebanon.

== History ==
Byblos Bank was initially founded in 1950 as “Société Commerciale et Agricole Byblos Bassil Frères & Co.”, a Lebanese company specialized in natural silk, leather tanning, and agricultural credit activities. In 1961, the company's name was changed to “Société Bancaire Agricole Byblos Bassil Frères & Co.”, and in 1963 it was established as Byblos Bank S.A.L and registered at the newly established Banque du Liban.

It welcomed its first banking clients in 1963 in Jbeil, Lebanon.

The initial founders include Semaan Melkan Bassil, Youssef Melkan Bassil, Victor Fernainé and Fouad Fernainé, all hailing from powerful families based in the ancient Phoenician town of Byblos, north of Beirut. François Bassil, the current Chairman of Byblos Bank Group, contributed to the establishment of Byblos Bank S.A.L in 1963.

== International partnerships ==
Byblos Bank has established partnerships with several international entities including: the International Finance Corporation (IFC), which is the private sector arm of the World Bank Group, the Agence française de développement (AFD), which is a public institution providing development financing and its subsidiary, the Société de Promotion et Participation pour la Coopération Economique (PROPARCO). These institutions are among the Bank's most notable shareholders. In 2009, Byblos Bank appointed The Bank of New York Mellon as a depositary bank.

== Listing and areas served ==
Byblos Bank is listed on the Beirut Stock Exchange and became in 2009 the first Lebanese issuer to be listed on the London Stock Exchange. It also actively operates in 9 countries in the Middle East, Europe, and Africa: the United Kingdom, France, Belgium, Syria, Armenia, Cyprus, the United Arab Emirates, Iraq, and Nigeria.

== See also ==
- List of Banks in Lebanon
- Banque du Liban
- Economy of Lebanon
- Semaan Bassil
- Joumana Bassil Chelala
- François Bassil
