= Ivan Antonov =

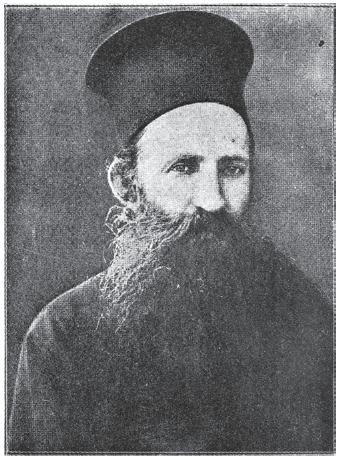
- A photograph of Ivan Antonov
- Born: 1 January 1880; Petrich, Ottoman Empire, today Bulgaria
- Died: 1 November 1928 (aged 48); Lukovit, Bulgaria
- Organization: IMARO

Ivan Antonov (Bulgarian: Иван Антонов) was a Bulgarian revolutionary, an archpriest, and a proponent for the Bulgarian Exarchate in Macedonia.

== Biography ==
Ivan Antonov was born in 1882 in the town of Petrich, today's Bulgaria, then part of the Ottoman Empire. He studied in Petrich and later in the Bulgarian Pedagogical School in Serres. In 1905, he finished the Bulgarian Theological School in Istanbul with distinctions. The same year he was appointed teacher in Serres.

In 1906, he became a member of the Serres committee of the Internal Macedonian-Adrianople Revolutionary Organization (IMARO). Because of betrayal, he was arrested by the authorities and imprisoned in Edikule, a prison in Thessaloniki, and later sentenced to life imprisonment on the Rhodes Island.

In 1908 he was released with an amnesty; on 23 April he was appointed priest in Vratsa and, on 2 July, chosen president of the Bulgarian municipality of Petrich. As its president, Angelov developed and strengthened the positions of the Bulgarian Exarchate in the region of Petrich. From 1910 to 1913, Ivan Antonov was a president of the Bulgarian municipality of Prilep.

After the break of the Balkan War in 1912, Antonov openly opposed the anti-Bulgarian policy of assimilation of the Serbian authorities, for which he was arrested, tortured and expelled to Bulgaria in June 1913. At first, he moved with his family to Vratsa, and later in Lukovit.

Ivan Antonov died in Lukovit in 1928.
