= Vasile Hossu =

Vasile Hossu may refer to:

- Vasile Hossu (bishop of Gherla) (1866–1916), Romanian Greek-Catholic hierarch, Bishop of Gherla (1911–1916)
- Vasile Hossu (bishop of Oradea) (1919–1997), Romanian Greek-Catholic hierarch, Bishop of Oradea (1990–1997)
