= Gloria Vitanza Basile =

American novelist and songwriter

- Born: Gloria Vitanza; June 29, 1929; Westfield, New York
- Died: September 29, 2004 (aged 75); San Jose, California
- Education: San Jose University; UCLA
- Writing career
- Genres: Romantic thriller Science fiction
- Notable work: The Godson (1976)

Gloria Vitanza Basile (June 29, 1929 – September 29, 2004) was an American novelist and songwriter.

She was born in Westfield, New York in 1929 to Sicilian immigrant parents. She studied at San Jose University and at UCLA. Before she began her writing career, she owned and managed a women's clothing shop. She published 13 best-selling novels, mainly romantic thrillers and later science fiction. She also wrote the song, "Ballad of One-Eyed Jacks," for the film, One-Eyed Jacks (1961), starring Marlon Brando.

Her best known novel is The Godson (1976), later renamed House of Lions, about a Mafia family; at the time, this was an unusual topic for women writers. In an interview, Basile said her childhood experiences with prejudice against Sicilians inspired her to research her roots, and resulted in The Godson and another novel, Appassionato (1978), set in post-war Sicily. She published two novels under the pen name Michaela Morgan.

== Works ==
- The Godson / House of Lions (1976)
- Appassionato (1978)
- The Manipulators Trilogy
  - The Manipulators (1979)
  - Born to Power (1979)
  - Giants in the Shadows (1979)
- Marco (1980)
- Francesca (1981)
- Global 2000 Trilogy
  - Eye of the Eagle (1983)
  - The Jackal Helix (1984)
  - The Sting of the Scorpion (1984)
- Iago, Phaedra
- Aurora
- Bethaynia

As Michaela Morgan:

- Zanzara (1978)
- Madelaina (1979)
