= Vasile Ianovici =

Romanian Orthodox priest and writer

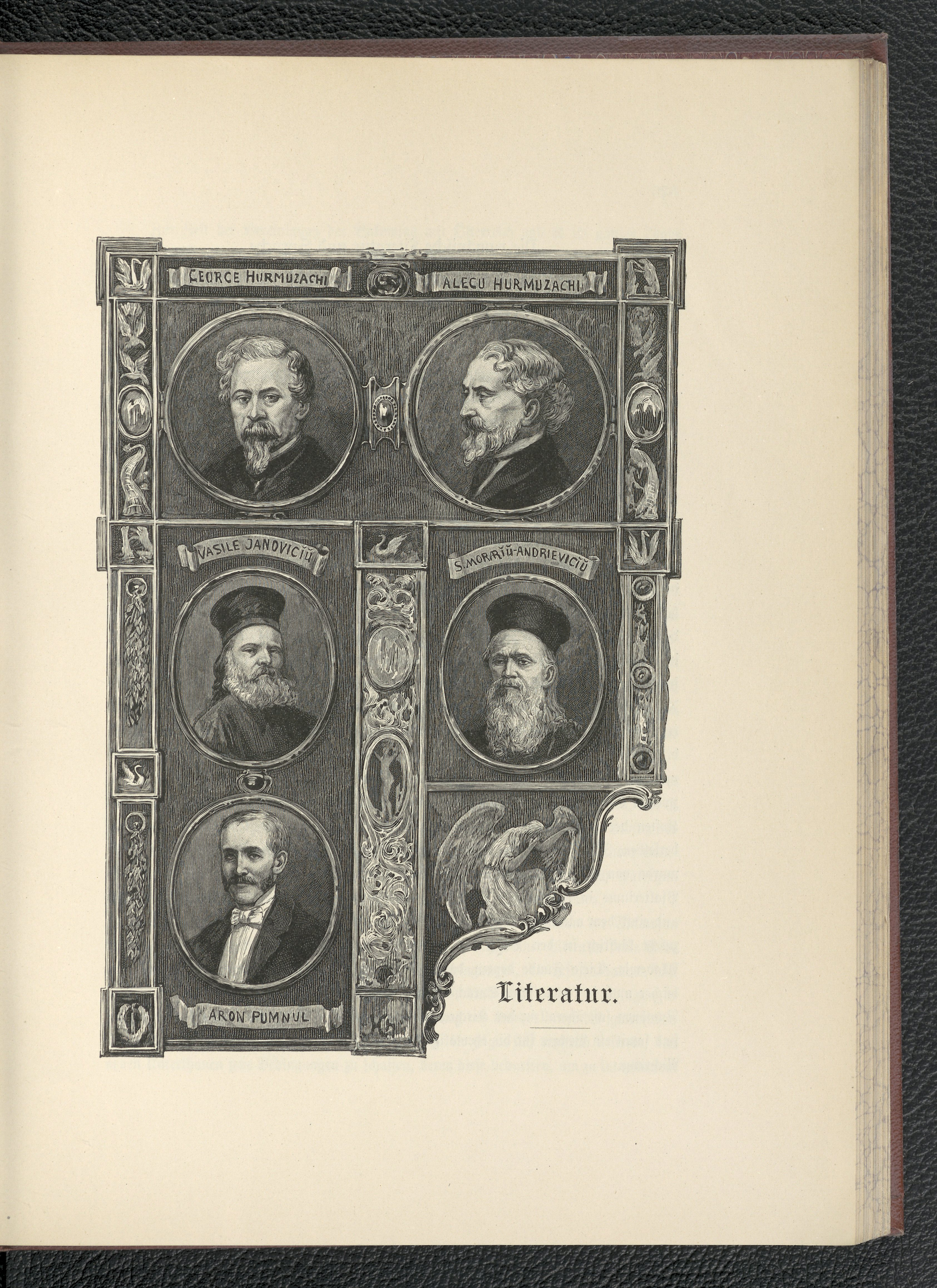
Vasile Ianovici (second row, first from the left)

Vasile Ianovici (December 31, 1806–September 26 [O.S. September 14] 1866) was an ethnic Romanian Orthodox priest, professor and writer in the Duchy of Bukovina, in the Austrian Empire.

Born in Cernăuți, he was descended from a family called Arnăutu, from Macedonia. He studied at the gymnasium and at the theological institute in his native city, completing the latter in 1834. He studied law at Lemberg University but did not graduate. Ordained a priest in the Orthodox Church, he was immediately hired to teach Biblical studies and New Testament exegesis at his alma mater, remaining there from 1836 until his death. Between 1848 and 1849, he was the first professor of Romanian at the Czernowitz Theological Institute. From 1852 to 1860, he was Romanian-language translator for the Bukovina government. He also taught at the Orthodox normal school in Cernăuți. From 1862 to 1866, he served in the Diet of Bukovina. A deeply cultured man, his linguistic preoccupation led him to author a series of grammar textbooks (with help from Transylvanian intellectuals Alexandru Sterca-Șuluțiu and Timotei Cipariu), reflecting his firm grasp of Romanian and its expressive potential. He also wrote literary history and translations. He died in Kolomyia, from cholera he contracted during a trip.
