= Vasil Slavov =

Bulgarian author and poet

Vasil Atanasov Slavov (Cyrillic: Васил Атанасов Славов) is a prize-winning Bulgarian author and poet, born on February 25, 1958, in Sofia, Bulgaria. He has been living in the United States since 1989. Slavov graduated with a specialization in English philology from Sofia University.

== Works ==
Slavov's first collectioн of poetry (Спомен за Потоп), titled Memory of the Flood, was published in 1989. Since then, Slavov has published numerous books of poetry as well as works of prose and essays. Slavov's frequent editors include other prominent Bulgarians of the same generation, including Georgi Borissov, Boris Hristov, Penka Vatova, and Rumen Leonidov.

=== Poetry ===
Following Memory of the Flood, Slavov followed up with these poetry books:

- "Scourge of God", 1992
- "7 Hours of Sun", 2005
- "Beast"
- "The Vans of Adamsburg", 1998
- "Notes of the Parsoned", 2001
- "The Tunnels of Galitzin", 2001
- "Americana", 2010
- "Sledverie", 2017
- "Mute", 2021

== Awards ==
Slavov is a prizewinner of the national poetry competition "Bino Ivanov" (2012, 2015) as well as an accompanying award in the national poetry competition "Hristo Fotev" (2016). His work "Sledverie", published by "Fakel" publishing house at the end of 2017, was awarded the grand prize for poetry in the "Damyan Damyanov" (2018).

== Personal life ==
Slavov is the son of Bulgaria dissident and writer Atanas Slavov.
