= Barsegh =

Barsegh (Armenian: Բարսեղ) is an Armenian given name. Parsegh is an alternative in Western Armenian.

Barsegh and Parsegh may refer to:

== Religious leaders ==
- Parsegh of Cilicia, Armenian Catholicos of Cilicia from 1105 to 1113
- Barsegh or Basil the Doctor (fl. 1146), poet and chaplain of Baldwin of Marash
- Parsegh, Armenian Patriarch of Jerusalem (1341–1356)
- Parsegh Petros IV Avkadian, known as Basile Petros IV Avkadian, Armenian Catholic Patriarch from 1780 to 1788

== Others ==
- Barsegh Kanachyan or Parsegh Ganatchian (1885–1967), Lebanese-Armenian composer and conductor
- Barsegh Kirakosyan (born 1982), Russian-born Armenian football player
- Parsegh Shahbaz (1883–1915), Ottoman Armenian lawyer, political activist, journalist, and columnist
