= Vasil Adzhalarski =

Revolutionary from Macedonia (1880–1909)

Voivode Vasil Adzhalarski
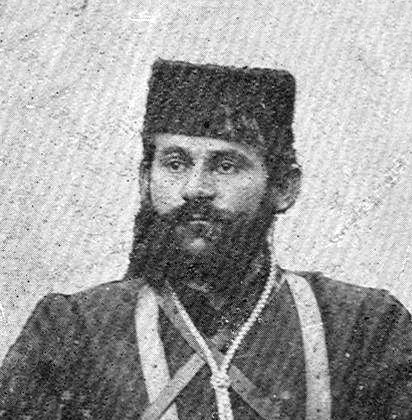
- Image of Vasil Adzhalarski.
- Native name: Васил Аджаларски
- Born: Vasil Stoyanov Staykov; Васил Стоянов Стайков; 24 December 1880; Adzhalari, Kosovo Vilayet, Ottoman Empire (now the Republic of North Macedonia)
- Died: 14 November 1909 (aged 28) Üsküp, Kosovo Vilayet, Ottoman Empire (now the Republic of North Macedonia)
- Allegiance: IMRO
- Service years: 1903-1909
- Conflicts: Macedonian Struggle †; Ilinden Uprising

Vasil Stoyanov Staykov (December 24, 1880 – November 14, 1909) known as Vasil Adzhalarski, was a Macedonian Bulgarian revolutionary. He was a leader of revolutionary bands of the internal Macedonian-Adrianople Revolutionary Organization (IMARO) who were based in the regions of Skopje and Kumanovo.

== Biography ==
Vasil Stoyanov was born in 1880 in the village of Adzhalari, in the Sanjak of Üsküp of the Kosovo Vilayet of the Ottoman Empire (present-day North Macedonia). He received his nickname after this village, which is now known as Miladinovci. In 1901 he moved with his family to Skopje. He entered IMARO and realized a series of tasks for the Organization – he carried post, hid and purchased weapons – but he was arrested and spent two years in the prison Kuršumli An. He was released after an amnesty. In 1903, he became a revolutionary. At first he was an assistant of the band leader Sande Čolakot in Kumanovo. Later, he entered the revolutionary band of Bobi Stoychev and after that he himself became a leader, in the regions of Skopska Crna Gora and Blatija, under the supervision of Dame Martinov. Adzhalarski distinguished himself from the other freedom fighters with the assassination of several Muslim beys who were suppressing the local inhabitants.

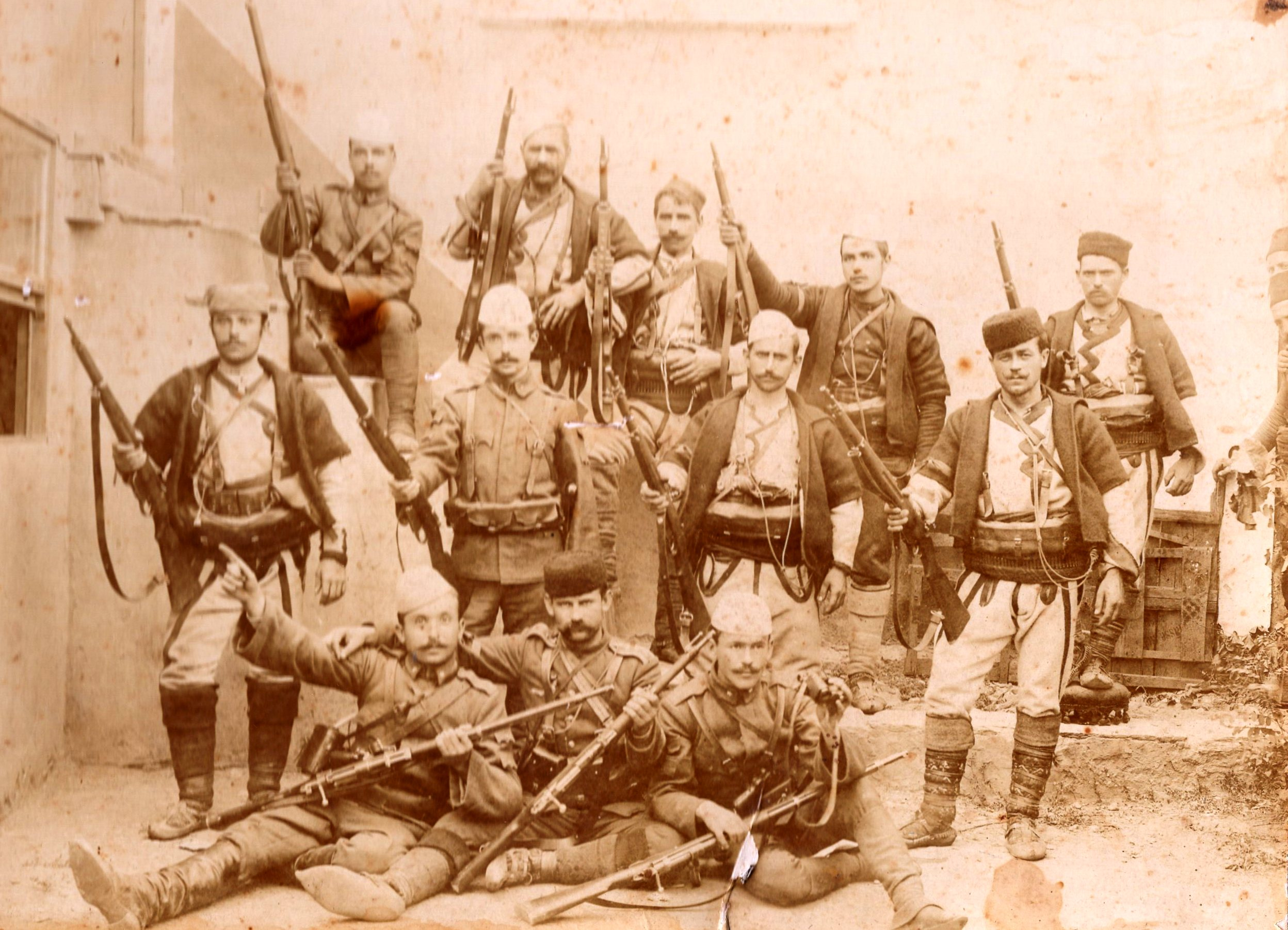
Skopje district detachment with its commander Adzhalarski.

In 1905, Vasil Adzhalarski became a regional leader of the Skopje region. From the end of 1904 until 1908 his revolutionary band conducted more than 10 massive battles with the Turkish military. Adzhalarski also took several successful actions against the armed Serbian propaganda. As a response to the murders of seven Macedonians from the Chair neighborhood by a Serbian band, he killed 9 Serbomans in Brodec, after which the Serbian bands ceased this type of actions. In February 1907, he burned the Han in the village of Sopishte, that served as a base for the traverse of the Serbian bands to the region of Porece.

After the Young Turk Revolution in 1908, he ceased to be a freedom fighter, but he was killed in an ambush by the Ottoman authorities in Skopje in 1909. His funeral was a reason for a massive protests by the Bulgarians from the region of Skopje against the authorities.

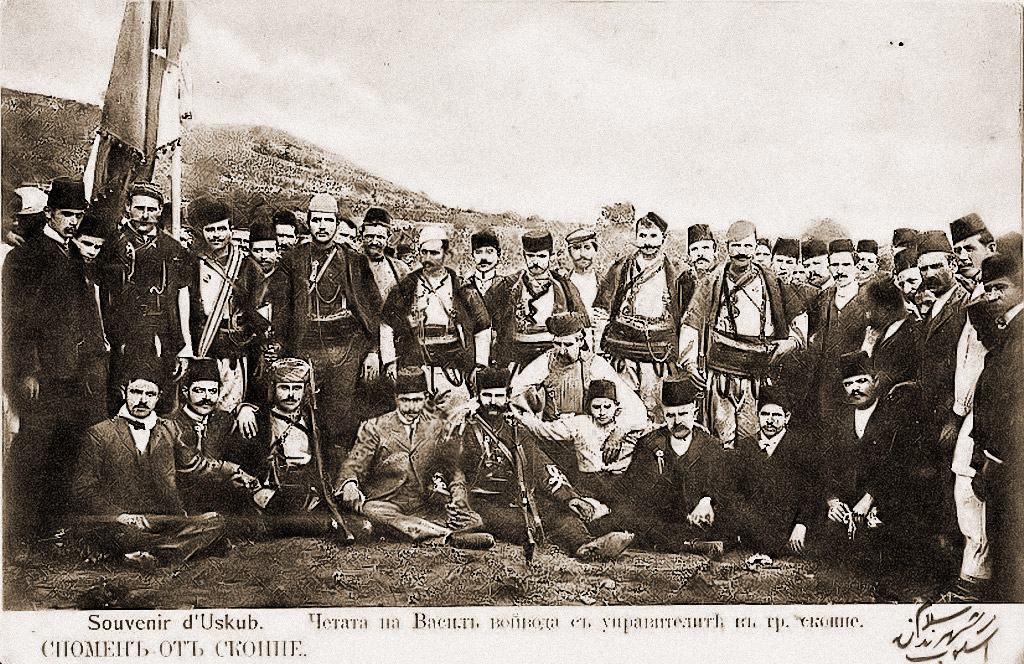
Bulgarian postcard depicting the revolutionary band of Vasil Adzhalarski after the Young Turk Revolution.

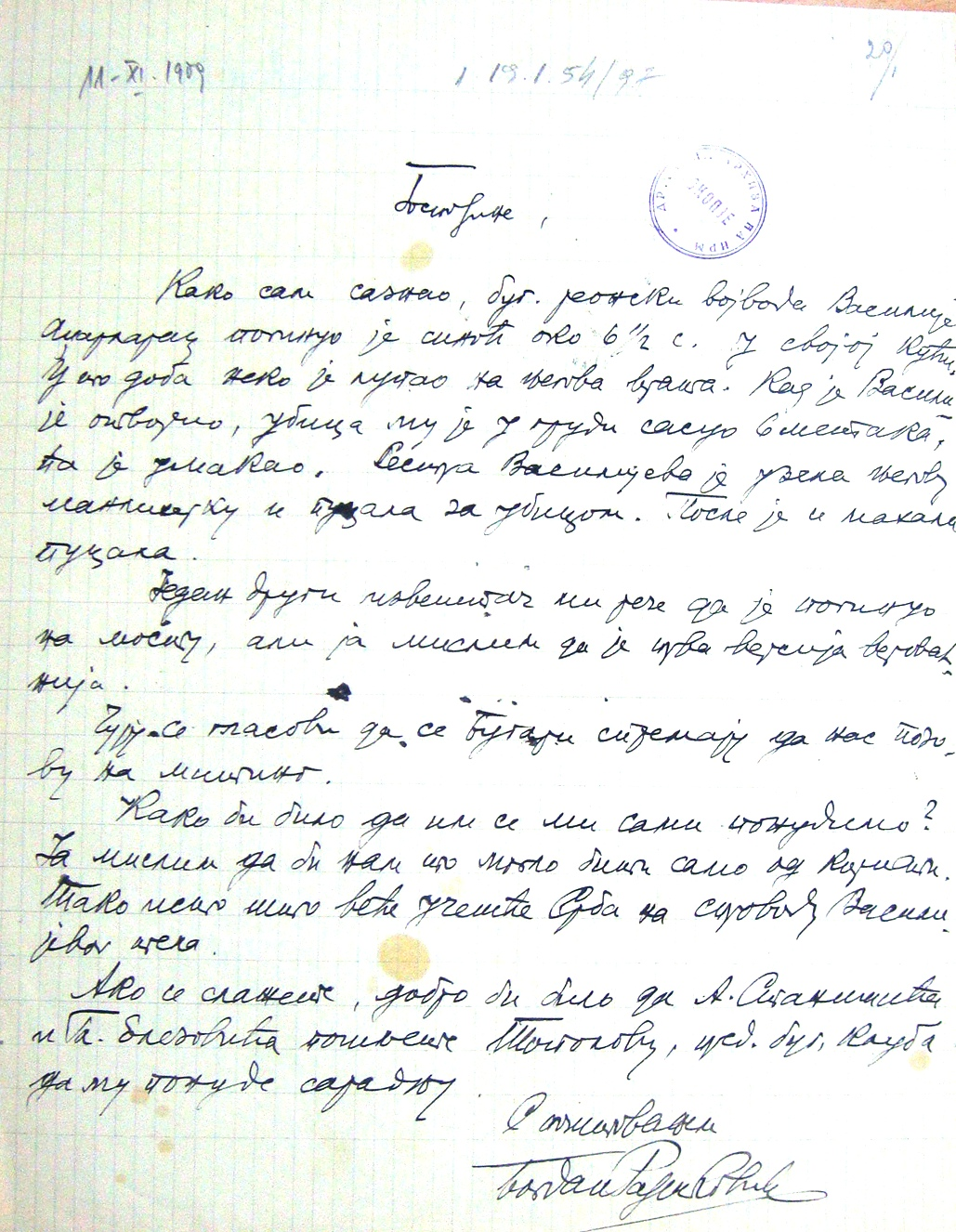
A letter from the Serbian activist Bogdan Radenković announcing the death of the Bulgarian voivode Adzhalarski.

== Literature ==
- "Две надгробни речи; След убийството на Васил Аджаларски; Подробности по убийството на войводата Васил Стоянов", публикувано во "Вести", книга 34, 35, 40, Цариград, 1909 г. The Istanbul Exarchist newspaper "Vesti" about the murder of Vasil Adzhalarski by the Turkish authorities (in Bulgarian) .
