= Bassel Al Shaar =

Syrian footballer (born 1982)

Bassel Al Shaar باسل الشعار
Personal information
- Full name: Bassel Hamamieh Al-Shaar
- Date of birth: February 15, 1982 (age 44)
- Place of birth: Damascus, Syria
- Height: 1.84 m (6 ft 0 in)
- Position: Defender

Youth career
- Al-Jaish

Senior career*
Years	Team	Apps	(Gls)
2002–2008	Al Jaish		
2008–2010	Al-Wahda		
2011–2013	Al-Ramtha SC		
2013–2014	Al-Wehda		
2014–2015	Al-Ahed	5	(0)

International career
2008–2009	Syria	6	(0)
- * Club domestic league appearances and goals

Bassel Al-Shaar is a Syrian former footballer who played as a defender.
