= Bazley =

Bazley is a surname. Notable people with the surname include:

- Bazley baronets, of Hatherop in the County of Gloucester, a title in the Baronetage of the United Kingdom
- Arthur Bazley (1896–1972), Australian soldier
- Colin Bazley (born 1935), English retired bishop of the Church
- James Bazley (born 1995), Australian cricketer
- John Bazley White (1848–1927), English cement manufacturer and Conservative politician
- Darius Bazley (born 2000), American basketball player
- Margaret Bazley (born 1938), New Zealand public servant
- Reg Bazley (1929–2009), English international rugby union player
- Richard Bazley (born 1962), British animator
- Robert W. Bazley (1925–2012), United States general
- Thomas Bazley (1797–1885), British politician
