= François Bassil =

Lebanese banker, politician

François S. Bassil
- Born: March 15, 1934 (age 92)
- Education: Université catholique de Louvain(Ph.D.)
- Occupations: Chairman, Byblos Bank

François Semaan Bassil (born March 15, 1934) is a prominent Lebanese banker. He was chairman and General Manager of Byblos Bank, one of Lebanon's top three banks from July 1979 to July 2015, and has served as chairman of the Board of the Association of Banks in Lebanon (ABL) for four terms. He currently holds the position of Chairman of Byblos Bank Group, an entity composed of banks and subsidiaries of Byblos Bank S.A.L. In 2015, Bassil was named in Global Finance Magazine’s first annual list of Who’s Who in The Middle East.

== Early life, education ==
Bassil was born in Fidar, north of Beirut in 1934. His father, Semaan Bassil, was a well-known businessman who founded in 1950 the “Société Commerciale et Agricole Byblos Bassil Frères & Co.”, a Lebanese company specialized in natural silk, leather tanning, and agricultural credit activities. In 1963, this company became Byblos Bank S.A.L.

Bassil holds a Doctoral Degree in Law (Ph.D.) from the Catholic University of Louvain, in Belgium.

== Distinctions ==
In 2008, Bassil was awarded an honorary doctoral degree “Doctorate Honoris Causa” in the humanities by the Lebanese American University (LAU), and in 2010 the Université Saint-Esprit Kaslik (USEK) awarded him an honorary degree “Doctorate Honoris Causa” in Business.

Throughout his professional career, he received many honorary distinctions, among them the Order of the Crown awarded by H.M. King Albert II of Belgium; and Knight in the Order of St. Gregory the Great, awarded by Pope John Paul II. In 2012, Lebanese President Michel Sleiman awarded Bassil the title of Commander in the National Order of the Cedar. In 2015, Bassil was awarded the Knight Grand Cross of the First Class of the Order of St. Gregory the Great by Pope Francis.

== Career ==
Bassil started his career in the banking sector in 1962 by contributing to the establishment of Byblos Bank S.A.L. and became chairman and general manager of the bank in 1979. He then lead the success and growth of Byblos Bank in Lebanon, transforming it from a mid-sized locally based entity to one of Lebanon's top three banks, with total assets of US$19 billion, and customer deposits reaching US$15.7 billion as of 31 December 2014.

Under his guidance, Byblos Bank established numerous international partnerships and received many distinctions, while maintaining its position as Lebanon's most solid Bank. Byblos Bank is listed on the Beirut Stock Exchange (BYB) and became in 2009 the first Lebanese issuer to list in the London Stock Exchange for twelve years.

Today, Byblos Bank actively operates in 10 countries worldwide including: Lebanon, the United Kingdom, France, Belgium, Armenia, Cyprus, the United Arab Emirates, Iraq, and Nigeria.

== See also ==
- Byblos Bank
- List of Banks in Lebanon
- Banque du Liban
- Economy of Lebanon
