= Theodosius of Sinai =

Bulgarian priest and printer

- Born: Dojran, Ottoman Empire
- Died: March 1843; Dojran, Ottoman Empire
- Other name: Teohar Gogov
- Occupations: Priest and printer

Theodosius of Sinai (Bulgarian: Теодосий Синаитски, Macedonian: Теодосиј Синаитски), was a Bulgarian priest and printer. He founded the first Bulgarian printing house in Thessaloniki.

== Life ==
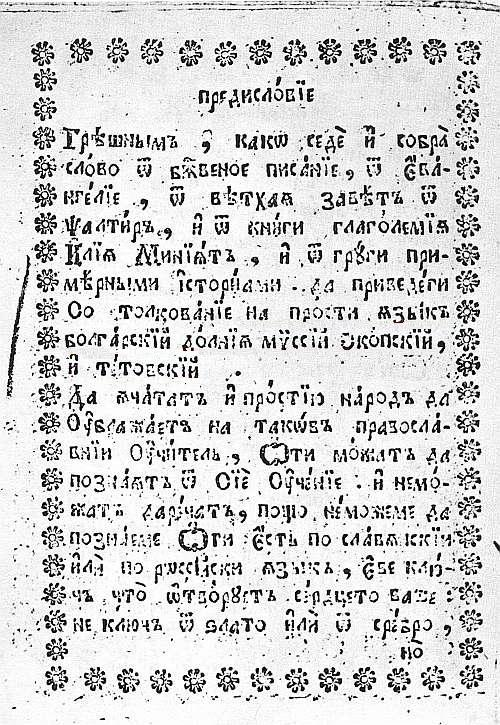
Theodosius' introduction to "Solace of the sinner"

Theodosius was born towards the middle of the second half of the 18th century in the town of Dojran, Ottoman Empire (today in North Macedonia). His exact birth year is unknown. Per the Macedonian Encyclopedia, he was born around 1780. His secular name was Teohar Gogov (Bulgarian: Теохар Гогов). His father Gogo had moved to Dojran from the surrounding villages. He was sent to study by his father in Constantinople. After the death of his father, he returned home and became a priest. Bulgarian publicist Atanas Shopov wrote about him: "When he returned to his native land, he knew Greek language better than the bishop." After the death of his wife, he toured the Macedonian region with the intention to become part of a monastery. He encountered and befriended Kiril Peychinovich, who was then abbot of the Lešok Monastery. Around 1827-1828, he went to the Saint Catherine's Monastery (Sinai Monastery), where he took the monastic name Theodosius. He translated prayers from Greek into Slavic and often performed church services in Church Slavonic. Theodosius stayed at the monastery for about four years. Towards the end of his stay, Theodosius was ordained to the rank of archimandrite.

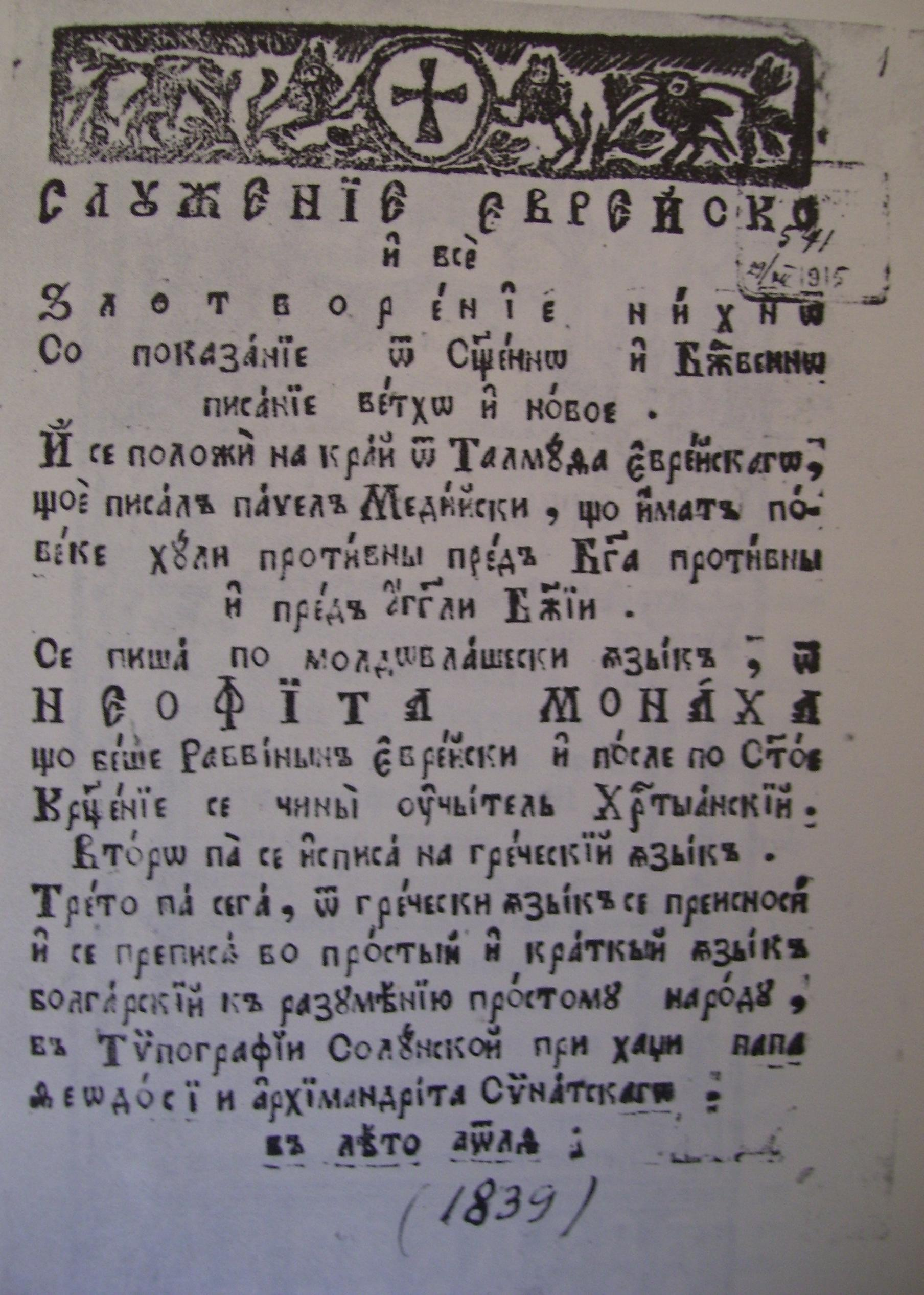
"Jewish Service"

In 1831, the Thessaloniki church "St.Menas" sent a request to Sinai Monastery to send Theodosius as a priest to Thessaloniki. The main motive of the request was that he could perform church services in the Slavic language. Theodosius encouraged and assisted Daskal Kamche to establish a Bulgarian printing house in the village of Vataša. Kamche's printing house was opened and operated for about a year. According to contemporaries, Kamche transferred the printing press and the letters to Thessaloniki after the closure, where they later served as the basis for the new printing house of Theodosius. Due to his contact with Bulgarian guildsmen, merchants and intellectuals, he wanted to establish a printing house to print books for Bulgarian schools and churches. He established the first Bulgarian printing house in Thessaloniki in 1838, with the permission of Greek Church authorities. The printing materials were purchased by a Jewish man from the Russian Empire, while a man named Demetrius was the typographer. Theodosius regarded his language as Bulgarian. In his printing house in 1838, he printed The Initial Doctrine with Morning Prayers in Slavic-Bulgarian and Greek. In the next year, he printed A Brief Description of the Monasteries of Mount Athos and the anti-Semitic tract Jewish Service and all of the wrongs they have done (translated by Nathanael of Ohrid when he was a student along with his teacher, into "simple and plain Bulgarian language"). In 1839, Theodosius' printing house was burned down, but it was soon restored with the financial support of Peychinovich. Peychinovich's book Utesheniе Greshnim ("Solace of the sinner") was printed in the restored printing house in 1840. Theodosius wrote the introduction of the book, where he mentioned that the book was written by Peychinovich in the "...plain Bulgarian language of Lower Moesia, Skopje and Tetovo...".

In 1841, Theodosius printed a book called A Book for Learning the Three Languages of Slavic-Bulgarian and Greek and Karamanlic. In the same year, Vasil Aprilov wrote about the printing house: "Now the Bulgarians are setting up their own printing house in Solun for printing church and secular books." A fire destroyed Theodosius' printing house for the second and final time. According to Dimitar Raykov, the fire occurred towards the end of 1842 or the beginning of 1843. Per historian Mercia MacDermott, the fire occurred in 1841 and was an arson committed by the Phanariots. According to Arseniy Kostentsev, the usable remains of Theodosius' printing press were taken to Vataša. The fire demotivated Theodosius and he returned to Dojran, where his sons ran a water-mill. Due to the weight of a heavy snow, the roof of the mill collapsed, seriously injuring him. He died after the incident, in March 1843. In 1845, Russian Slavist Viktor Grigorovich visited Thessaloniki and wrote about the remains of the "Slavic typography... founded by the local Bulgarian Theodosius, Archimandrite of Sinai in 1839." In North Macedonia, he is regarded as an ethnic Macedonian, while his language is regarded as Macedonian.

== Sources ==
- "Началное Оучение с Молитви Оутренния Славяноболгарский и Греческия" - The first book printed by Theodosius of Sinai in Salonica in 1838.
- Марин Дринов, Първата българска типография в Солун и някои от напечатаните в нея книги. – Периодическо списание на Българското книжовно дружество, год. 7, кн. 31, 1889
- Български възрожденски книжовници от Македония: избрани страници (отг. ред. Иван Дуриданов). С., 1983, 61-71
