= Romanian traditional clothing =

Traditional clothing of Romanians

Romanian traditional clothing refers to the national costume worn by Romanians, who live primarily in Romania and Moldova, with smaller communities in Ukraine and Serbia. Today, the vast majority of Romanians wear modern-style dress on most occasions, and the garments described here largely fell out of use during the 20th century. However, they can still be seen in more remote areas, on special occasions, and at ethnographic and folk events. Each historical region has its own specific variety of costumes.

== Ethnographic regions ==
Romanian traditional clothing can be classified according to seven traditional regions. These can be further subdivided by ethnographic zones, which may range between 40 and 120, depending on the criteria used.

The seven main traditional regions are:

- Transylvania or Ardeal
- The western plains: Lower Mureș Plain, Criș Plain (Crișul Negru, Crișul Alb, Crișul Repede), Lower Someș Plain (Oaș Country)
- Banat, including Timiș Meadow and Caraș-Severin
- Wallachia, including Western Wallachia called Oltenia and Eastern Wallachia called Muntenia
- The Lower Danube, including Bărăgan, Northern Dobruja and southern Moldavia
- Moldavia, including Bukovina, Western Moldavia, Eastern Moldavia also called Bessarabia and since 1991 Republic of Moldova including Transnistria
- Balkans or Romanians of the Balkan Peninsula, which can be further subdivided into four areas:
  - The Daco-Romanians along the borders: Southern Dobruja also called Cadrilater between 1913 and 1940 (Bulgaria), the Timok Valley (northwestern Bulgaria and eastern Serbia), Vojvodina/Serbian Banat and Ukraine (especially around Chernivtsi and Odessa)
  - Istro-Romanians in Istria, Croatia
  - Macedo-Romanians (or Aromanians) in Albania, Bulgaria, Greece and North Macedonia
  - Megleno-Romanians in Greece and North Macedonia
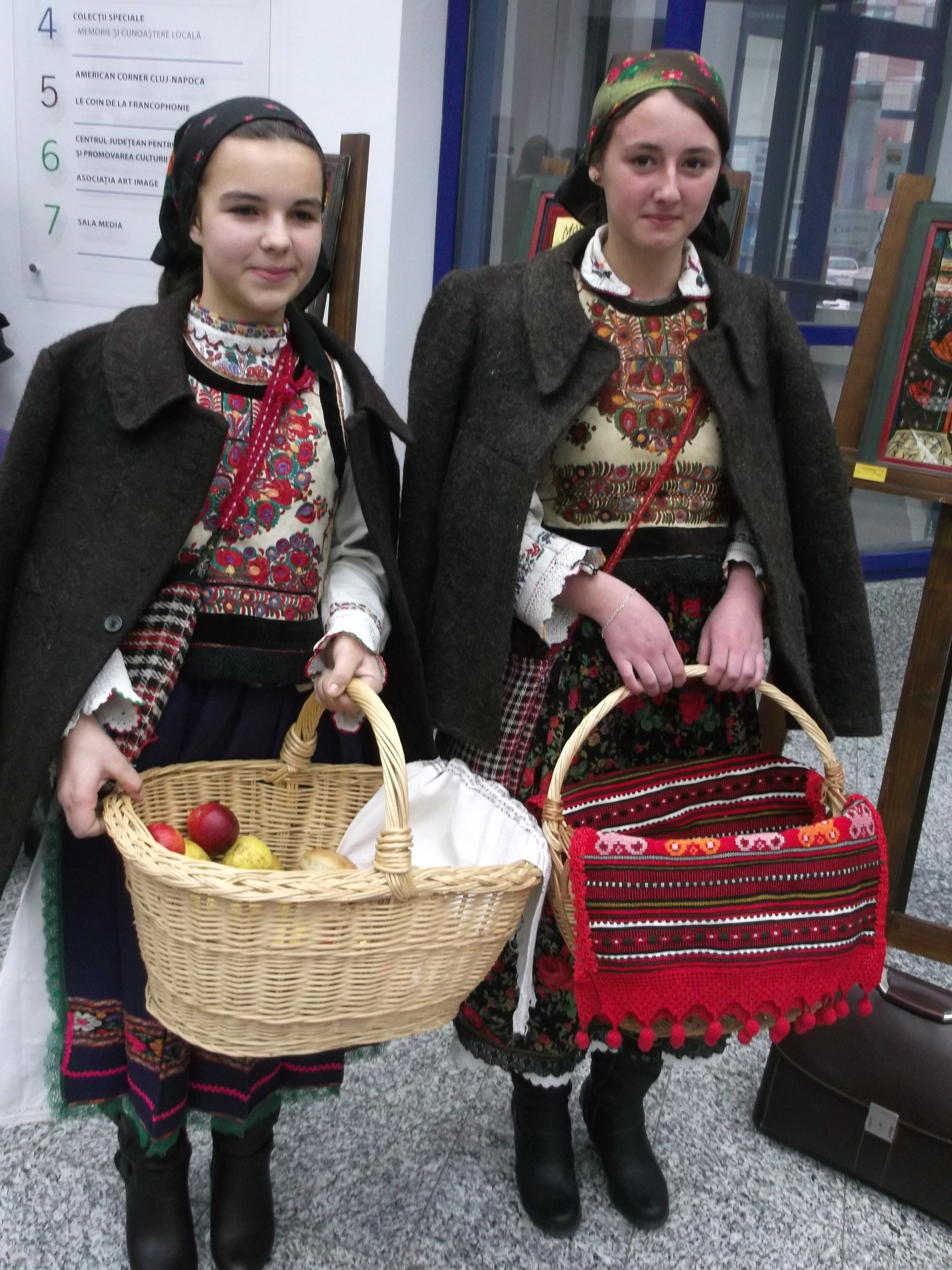
Transylvania

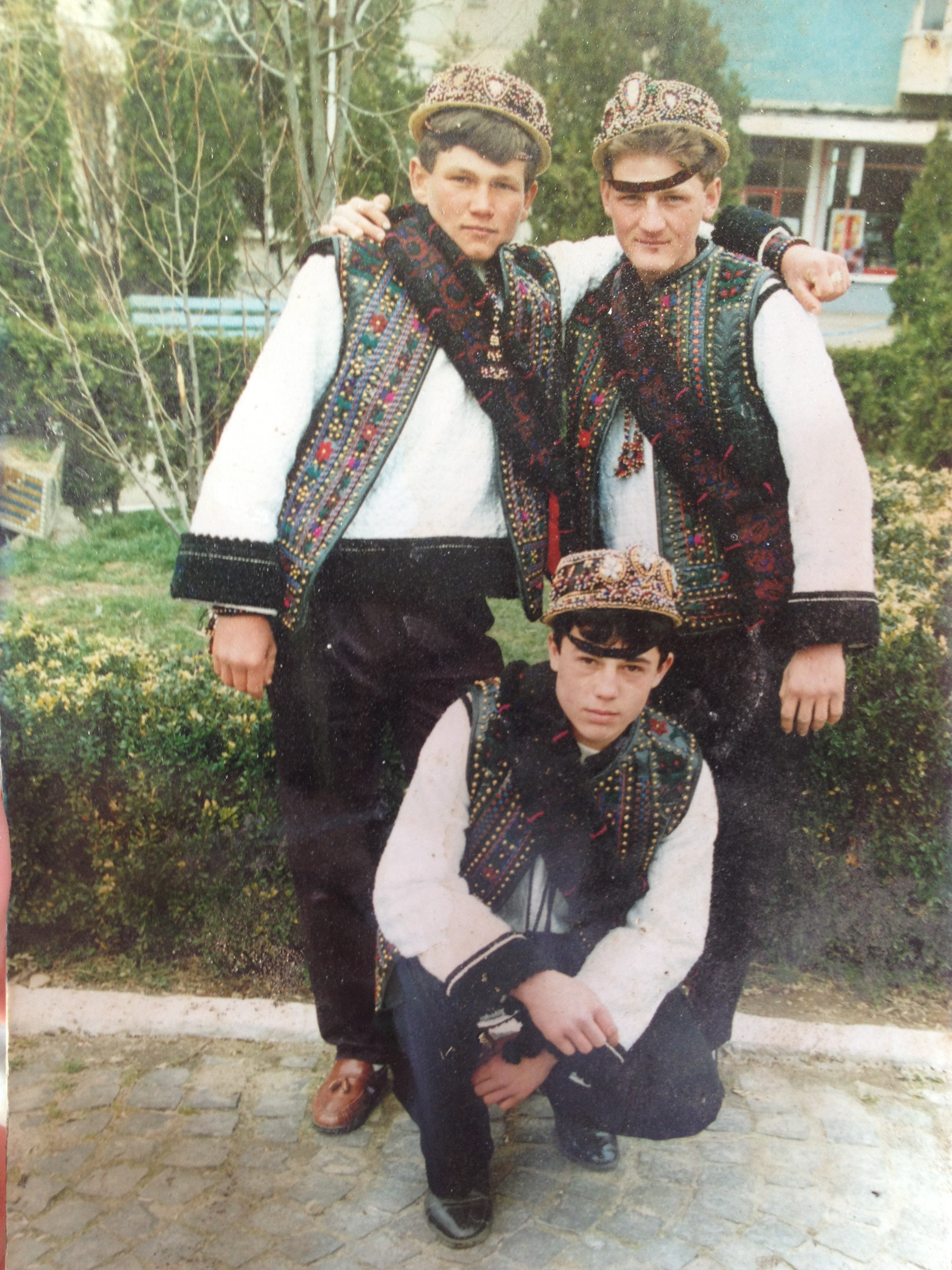
Oaș Country

Maramureș

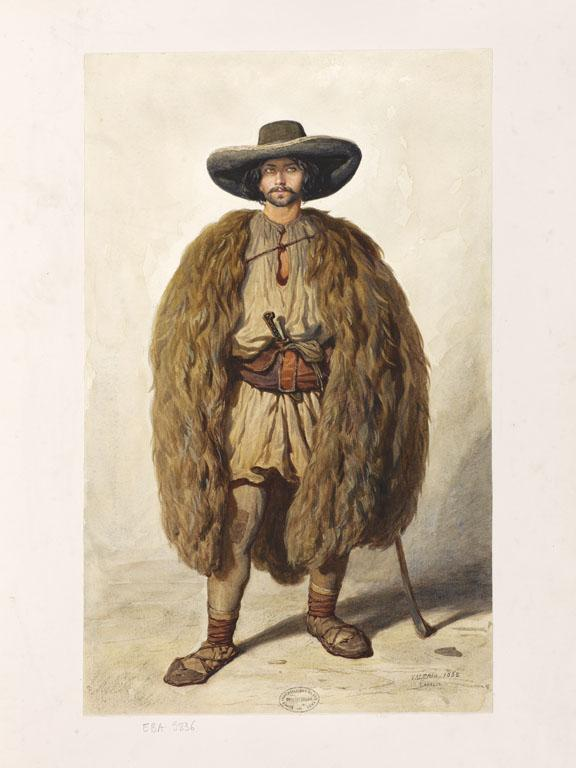
Crișana

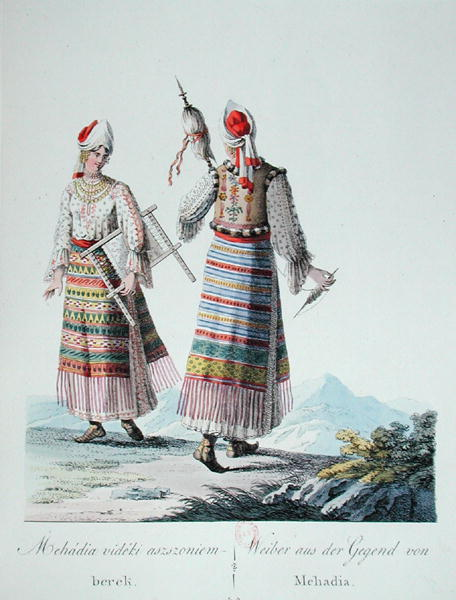
Banat

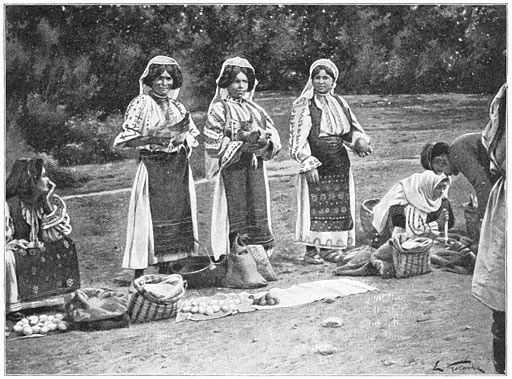
Wallachia (Oltenia)

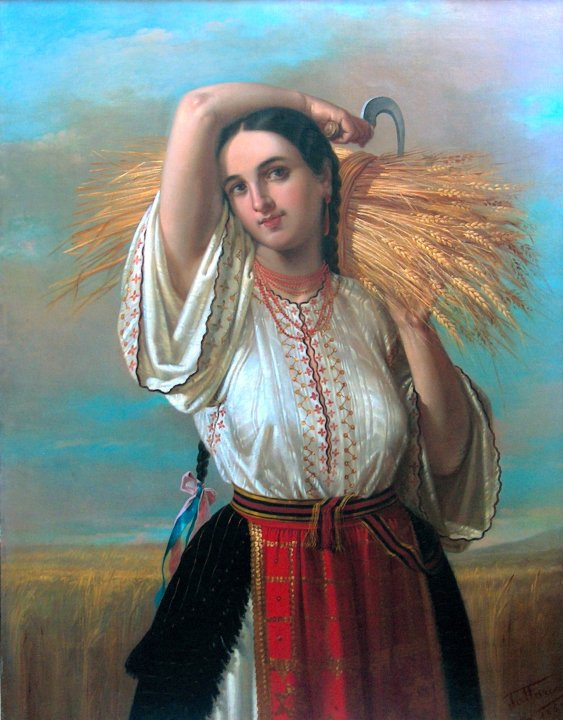
Wallachia (Muntenia)

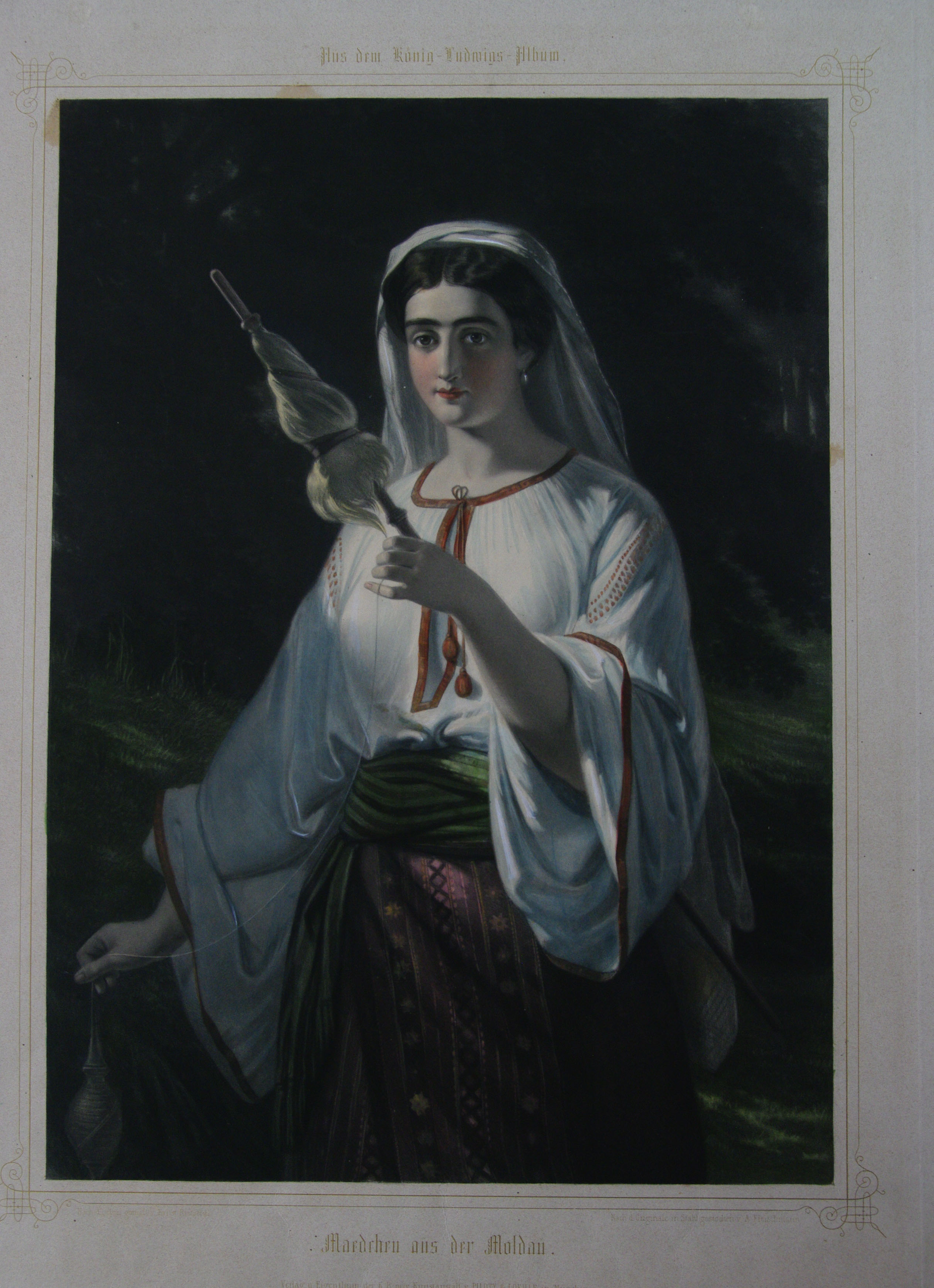
Western Moldavia

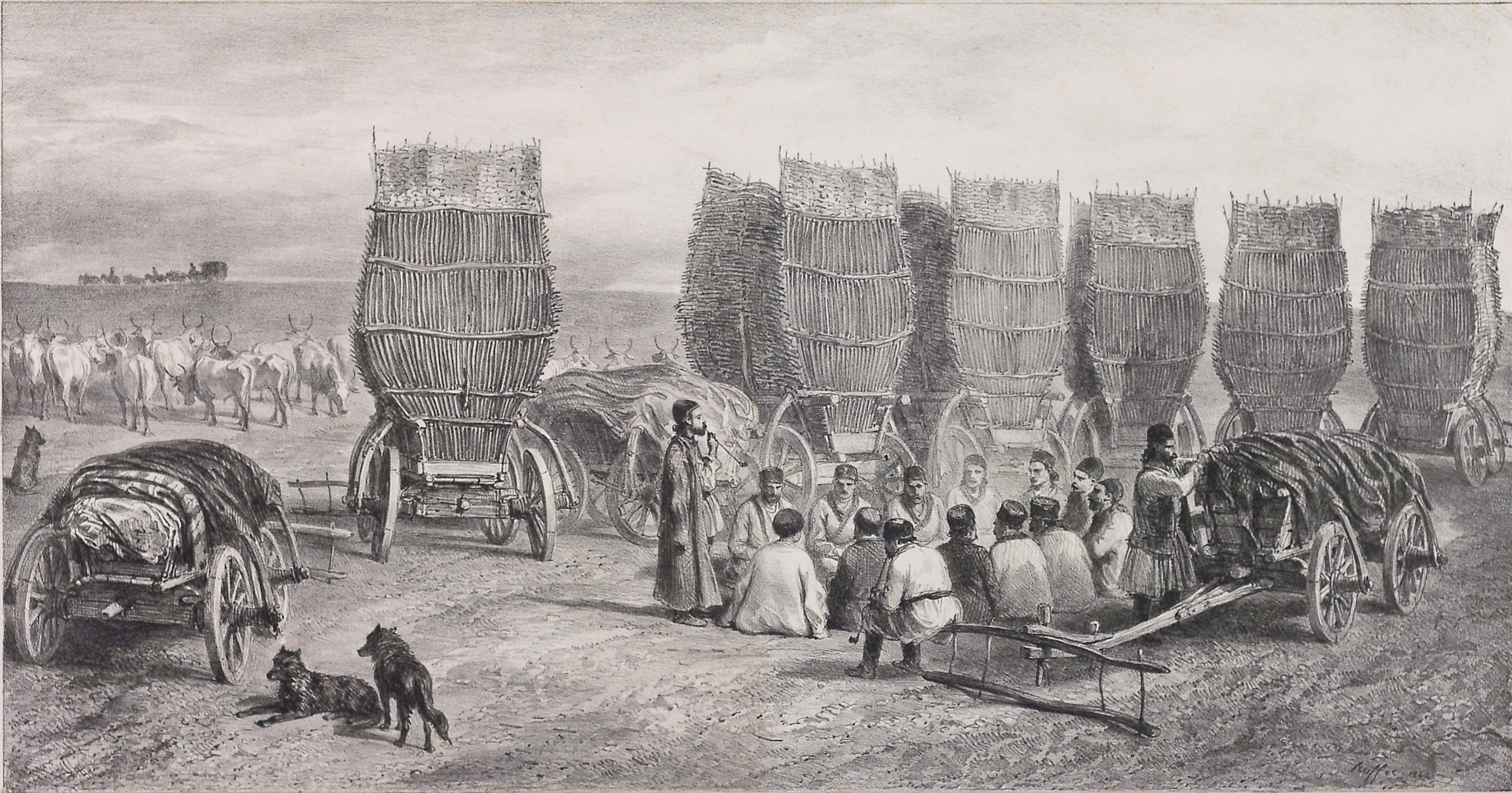
Eastern Moldavia (Bessarabia)

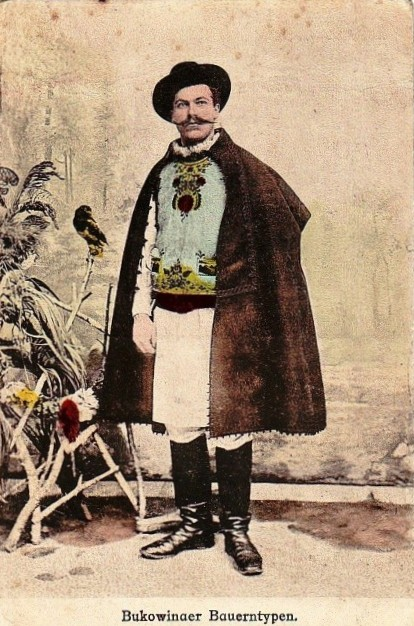
Bukovina

== Genesis and evolution of Romanian traditional costume ==
=== First mentions of Romanian clothing ===
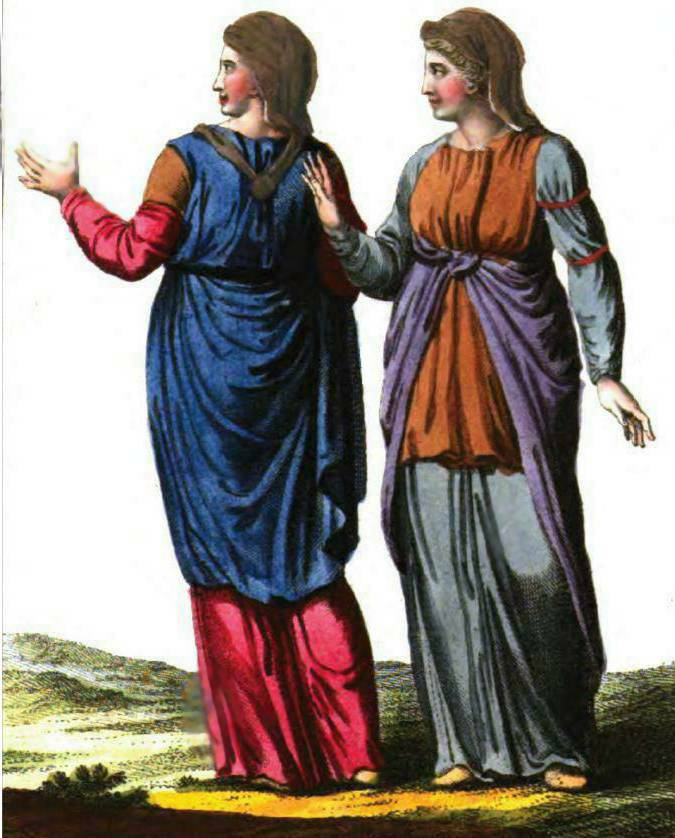
Dacian women wearing scarves similar to the contemporary headkerchief.

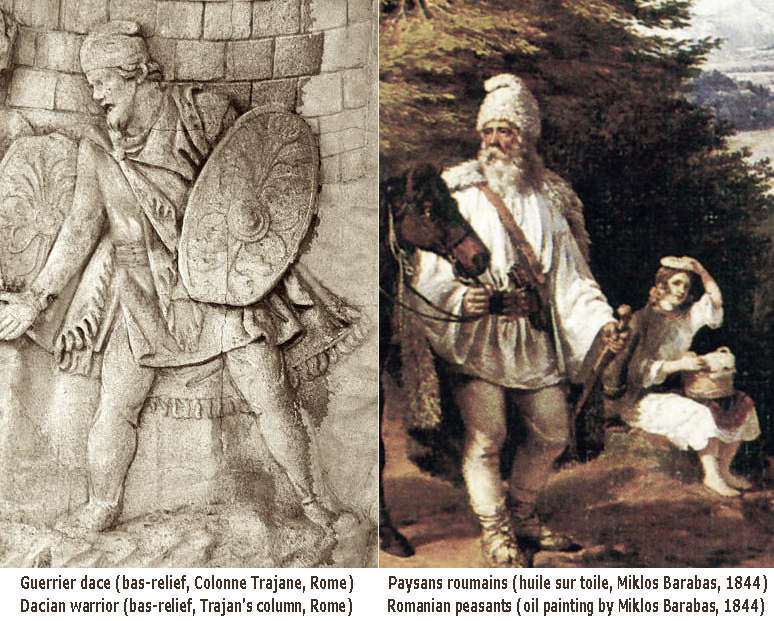
Artistic renditions of Dacian (2nd century BC) and Romanian (19th century) peasant dress

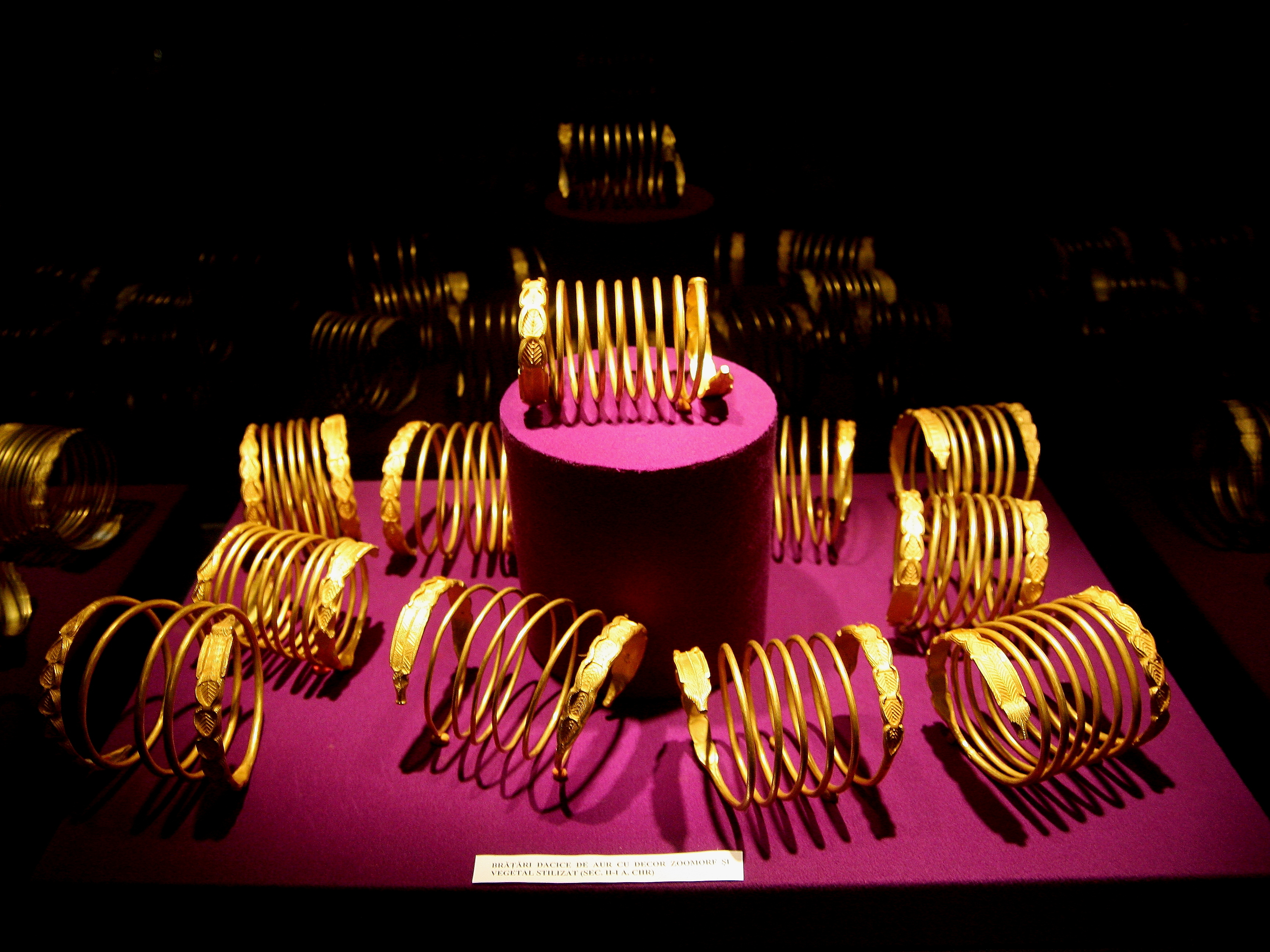
Given the weight (900-1,100 g) and size, the handmade gold bracelets were most likely worn by Dacian men, members of the upper class.

The Romanian popular costume finds its roots in the part of Thracian, Dacian and Getae ancestors and resembles that of the peoples of the Balkan Peninsula, of course with differences consisting of decorative and colourful details. For example, women's portraits carved on Trajan's Column in Rome after the Dacian Wars provide information about their clothing. Dacian women wore shirts rippled at the neck. Sleeves were either long and wide or short. The dress was long to the ground, over which sometimes was attached a wide draped mantle. In the feet, they wore leather sandals in summer and fur sandals in winter.

=== Middle Ages and Byzantine influence ===
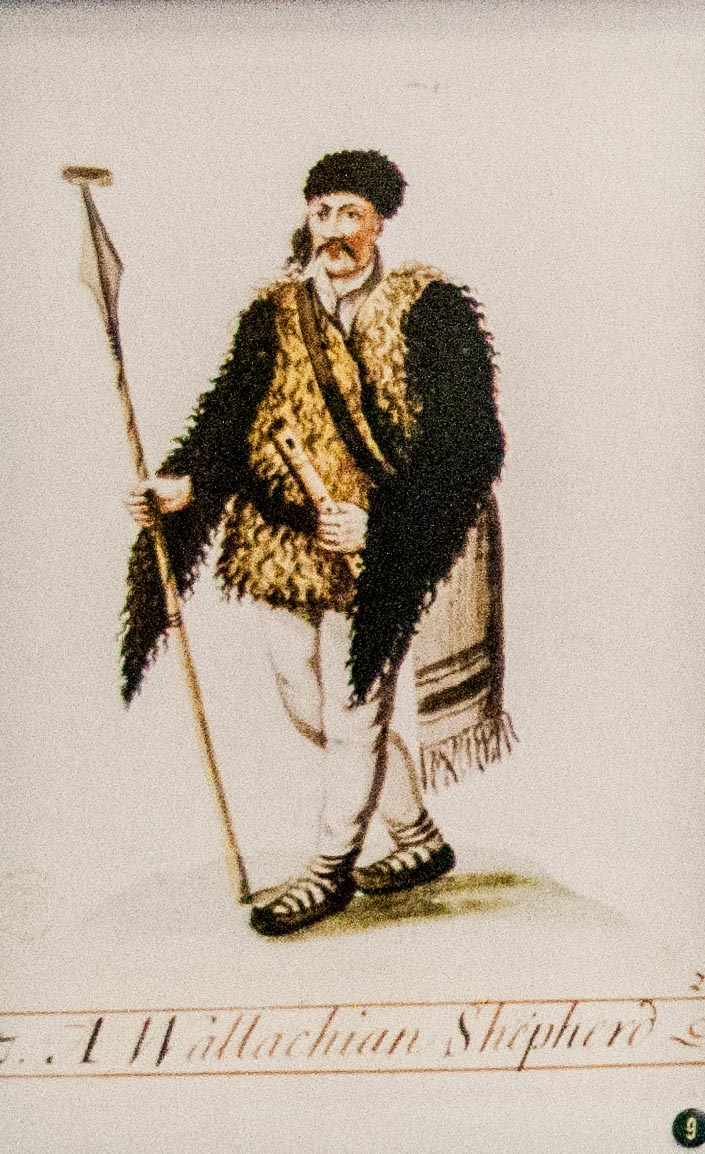
Costume of a typical Romanian shepherd, 18th century

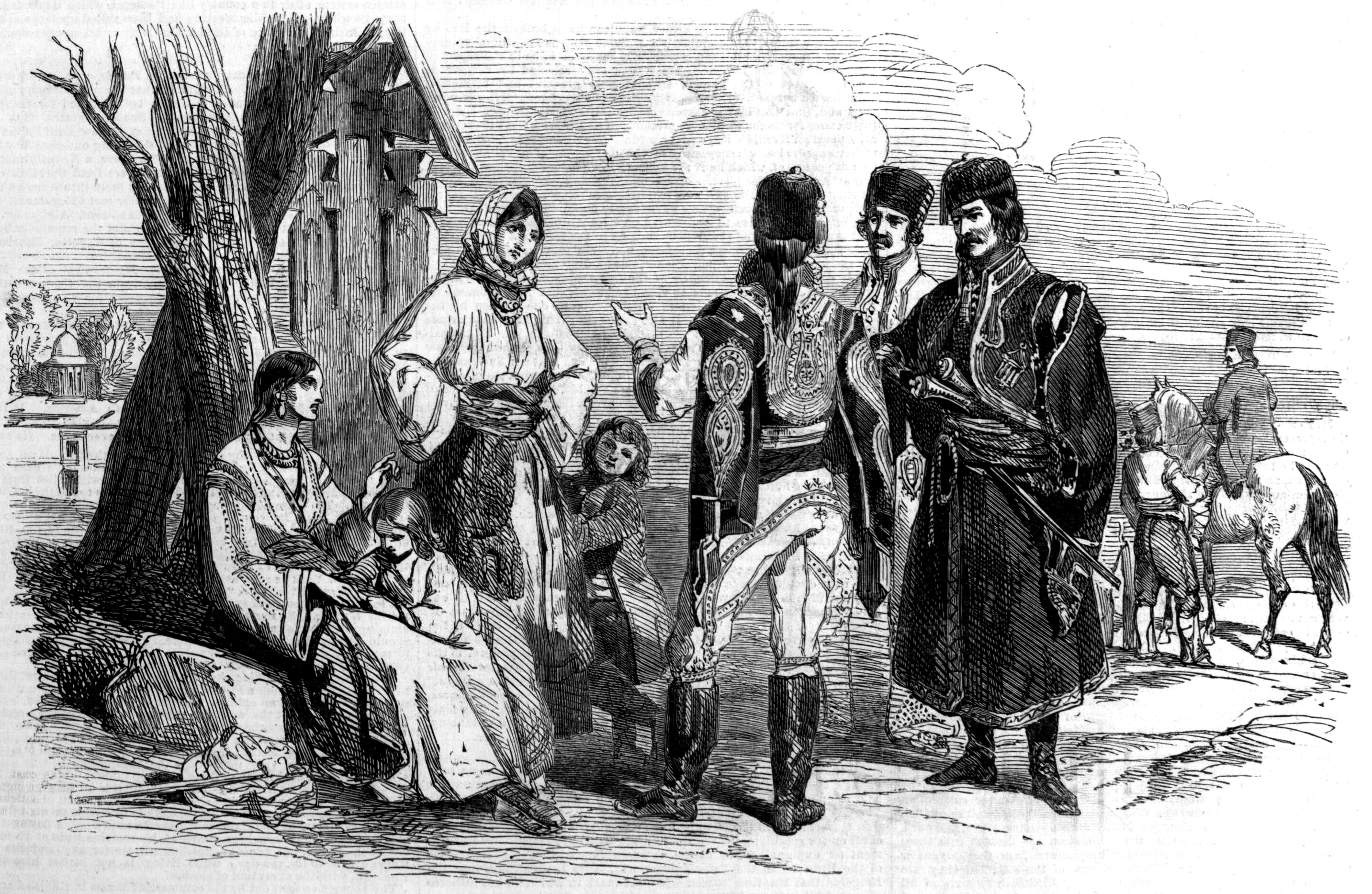
Wallachian peasantry and troops, 1853

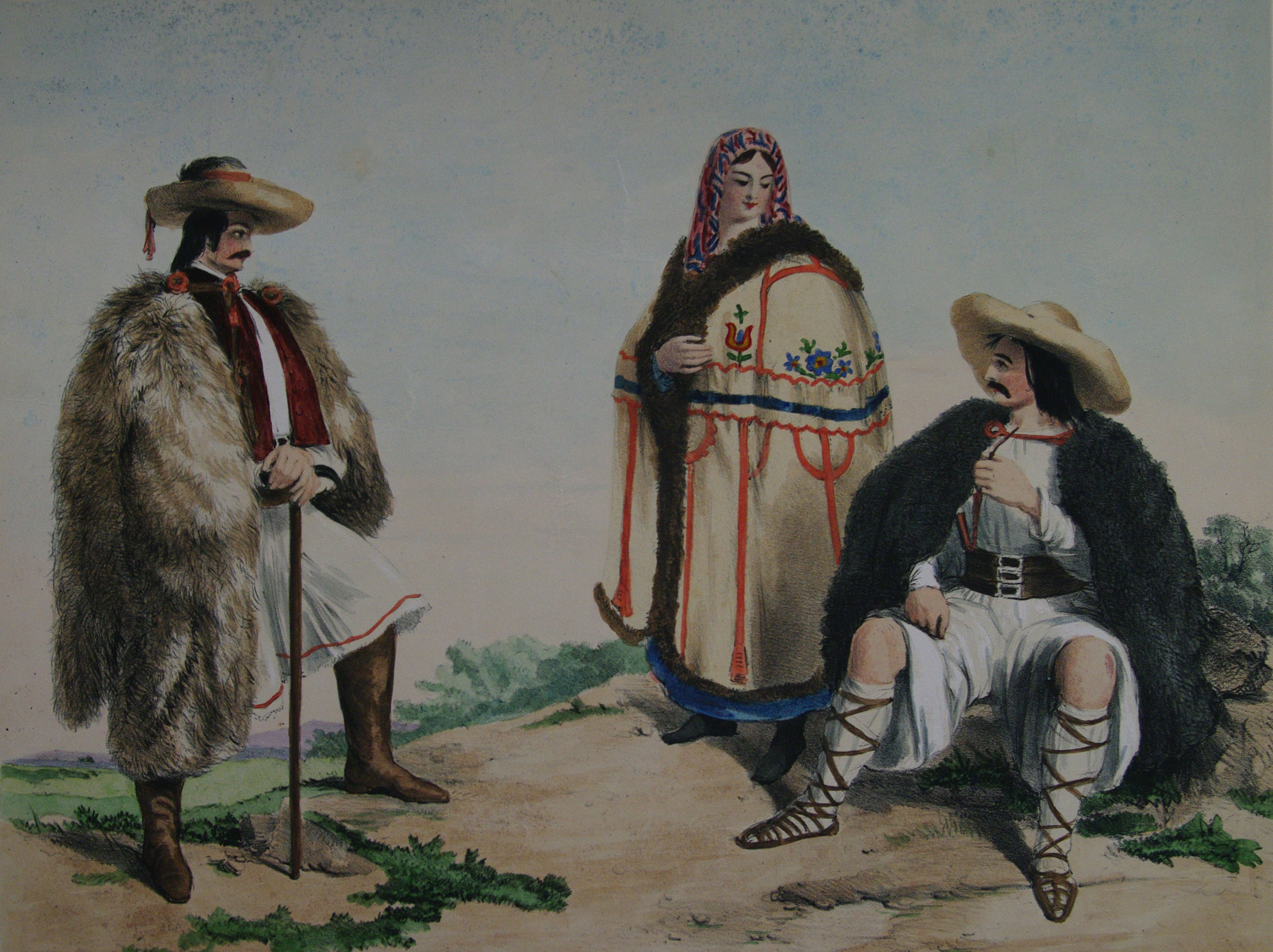
Painting by Stephen Catterson Smith depicting three peasants from Hodod, Transylvania

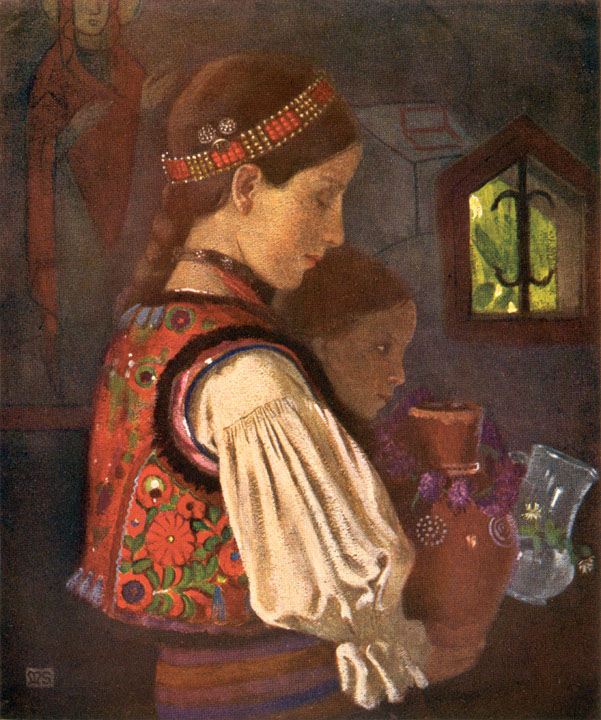
A Romanian girl wearing an elaborately decorated vest. Painting by Marianne Stokes

Portraits of the founders provide important information about the type of material of which were made the pieces of the port and about elements of tailoring, decor and chromatics. Between the eighteenth and nineteenth centuries, votive paintings on the walls of churches reserved for the country's rulers and nobility hypostasiate a wider range of donors. As a result, in the sub-Carpathian areas of Oltenia (especially in Gorj) appear portraits of free peasants, freeholders and yeomen.

But representations of peasant port date from the fourteenth century. In Codex Latinus Parisinus, written during 1395–1396 by Paulus Sanctinus Ducensis, a military engineer of King Sigismund of Luxembourg, besides portraits of knights and footmen appear described ancillaries of the army: craftsmen, cartmen, and fishermen. In Chronicon Pictum Vindobonense are portrayed men in white shirts and trousers (Romanian: cioareci). Over they wore shaggy Romanian: sarici with long sleeves and left on back. They wore simple leather shoes (Romanian: opinci). In a simple comparative analysis, it can be grasped that these elements are always present in the port of remote shepherds. Diaries of foreign travellers, particularly those of Antonio Maria Del Chiaro Fiorentino (secretary of Italian language of Constantin Brâncoveanu) and officer Friedrich Schwanz von Springfels contain rich information about the garments of Romanians: ladies, patronesses and peasant women wore identically tailored shirts, distinct being only the methods used for decoration.

Boyar shirts were of silk, embroidered with gold thread and decorated with pearls. The costume of Oltenia peasant women was composed of cotton shirts sewn with altițe, striped catrințe and bete. Like them, patronesses wore headlong handkerchiefs (Romanian: maramă) of floss silk or flax, that hung on the back.

In the context of building the national conscience, beginning with the mid-19th century there was a process of standardization and idealization of the Romanian port, in order to distinguish it from surrounding ethnic groups.

=== The present situation ===
After World War I, the popular clothing generalized across traditional communities remains just in the everyday life of the older generation, becoming a ceremonial vestment. In rural penetrated some albums with "national motifs" were edited by traders of textile fibres and dyes industries. During the communist period, these mutations decreased the creative process of costumes in the households.

Nowadays, the main wearers of peasant garb are the soloists of folk music, the folk dance ensembles and the actors in movies and shows.

== Men's clothing ==
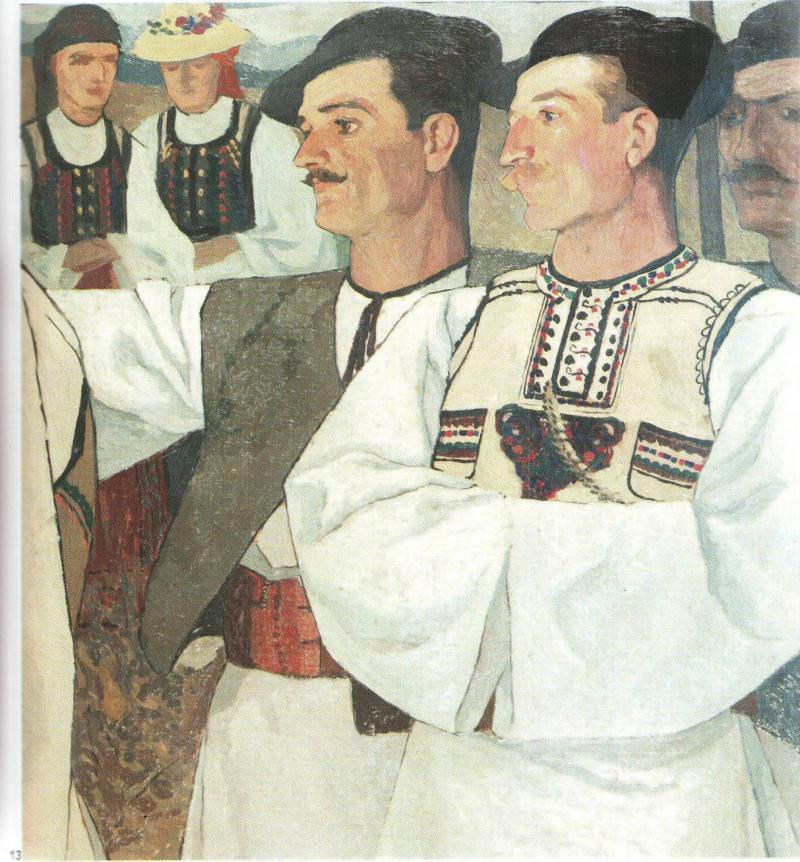
Peasants from Abrud. Painting by Ion Theodorescu-Sion

=== Ițari ===
The ițari are typical for Moldovans and represent a pair of long peasant trousers that were sewn from țigaie (a special breed of sheep wool) and had a length of 2 m, but being narrow, they were crimped on the leg from ankle to the knee. They were worn during the summer and the winter. Ițarii for summer wear are made of pânză de sac (bulky cotton).

=== Cioareci ===
The cioareci are peasant pants of white woollen cloth (dimie, pănură or aba) woven in four threads, therefore thicker than the ițari. In Banat, the cioareci are known as canvas or baize stockings worn by women during the winter. In Moldova can be found cioareci without creți that are worn in the working days. Here, they are also known as bernevici.

In the South and Moldova, trousers are worn over boots or shoes whereas in Transylvania they are tucked into the tops of the boots.

The amount and style of decoration on cioareci depends on regional style. The majority of the decoration is on the upper parts of the trousers around the pockets, and front. Trousers worn with boots did not have any decoration on the lower part whereas those worn with spats had decoration down the legs accenting the cut of the trousers and round the hems or turn-ups.

=== Romanian: Opinci ===
The oldest type of footwear is peasant sandals (Romanian: opinci) worn with hemp canvas, woollen or felt foot wraps (Romanian: obiele) or woollen socks (călțuni). Evidence for this style of footwear can be seen on a clay foot found in Turdaș, dating from around 2500 BC. Romanian: Opinci were worn throughout Romania and over a wide area of south and east Europe being known as opanke (Serbia), tservuli (Bulgaria), Romanian: opinci (North Macedonia), etc. Romanian: Opinci are made of a single rectangle of cow, ox or pig hide gathered round the foot in various ways.

=== Pieptar ===
Known often by various names locally, the pieptar is an embroidered sheepskin vest, made generally in two styles, opened (spintecat) or close (înfundat), with the first being of normal front cut and the second one having a side open to be closed with buttons or taken over the head like a pullover. They were usually made from sheepskin, with the sheared or non-heared fur worn inside for warmth and the embroidered part outwards.

=== Cămașă ===
Cămașă is literally the Romanian word for shirt, and the variety of cuts and styles is overwhelming, varying greatly not only by area but also by age, status and occupation, only to be surpassed in variety by the women ones. Traditionally they were made of hemp or linseed linen, later of cotton.

=== Suman ===
The suman is a long peasant coat, a cold weather garment, worn by both sexes, usually knee-deep, in white, cream, brown, gray or black woollen cloth (felt), decorated with various găitane. It is also known as țundră, zeghe or dulamă. They were normally tailored rough at home by the poor or by special suman makers from strips of shrunk woven boiled wool cloth, processed in water-powered fulling-mills known as "vâltoare". Sumans vary in thickness greatly from region to region, from a few millimetres of finely woven material in the south (Oltenia and Dobrudja), to a very rough two centimeters in the north (Maramureș).

=== Chimir and brâu ===
Of great importance was the girdle, their thick belt made of leather in the case of chimir or woven textile in the case of brau.

=== Hats ===
==== Sheepskin hats ====
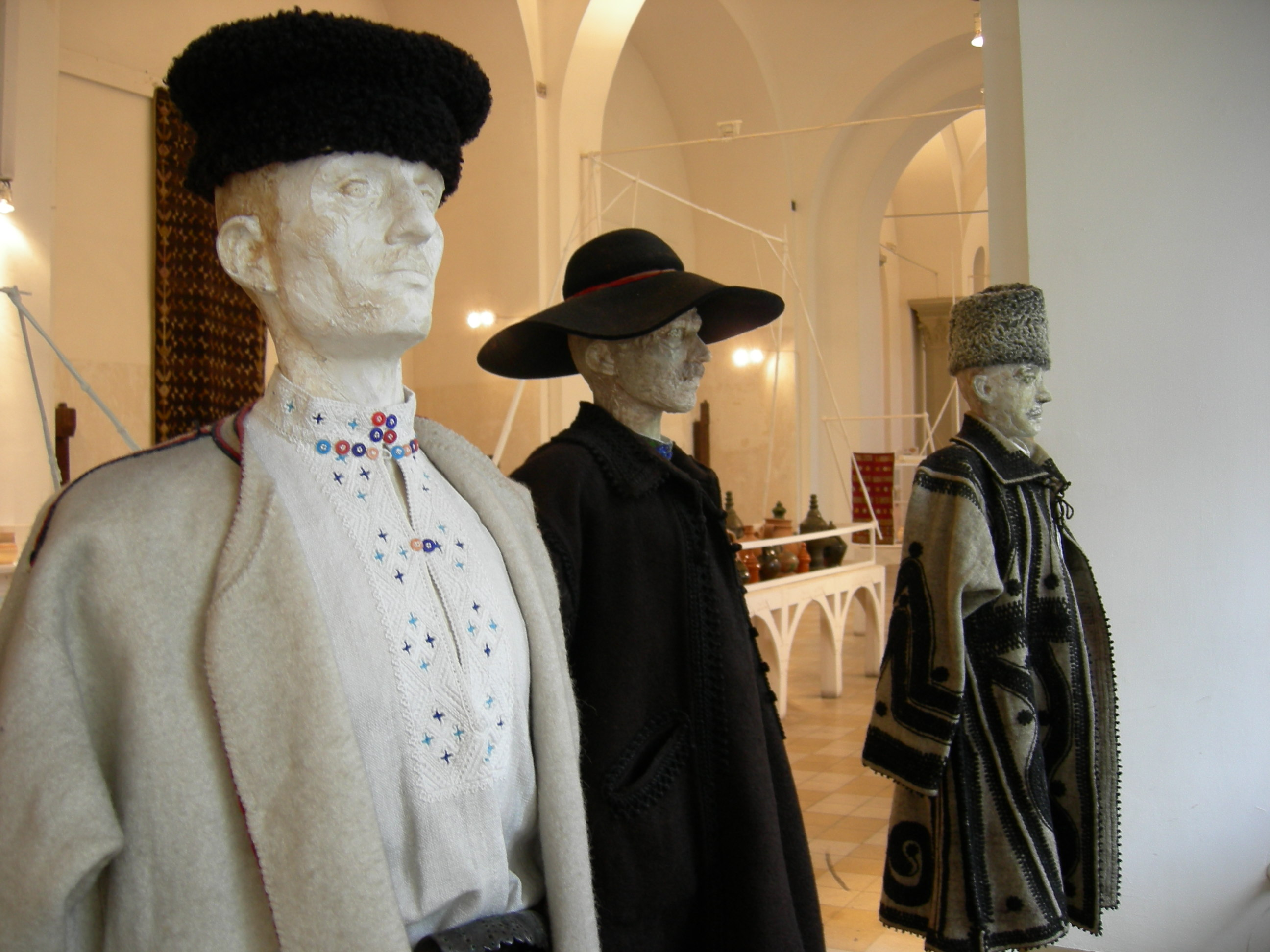
A variety of fur hats, Museum of the Romanian Peasant, Bucharest

Căciulă are worn all over Romania and in most of the surrounding Balkan countries in winter. Fur hats are made by furriers and are most often black, although white căciulă are worn in parts of Banat and grey in central and north Moldova. There are four types of căciulă found in Romania:

- High conical cap – căciulă țuguiată, moțată, cujmă – this is made of four pieces joined together lengthwise. It can be worn peaked, with top bent forward, back or sideways, or with top sunk inwards, depending on local fashion. It is worn in Moldova, Muntenia, Maramureș, Oltenia and Banat, originally by the "free men". In Banat Mountains, the cap is sometimes worn with fur inside and a narrow white fur hem at the base.
- Round low cap known as cujmă rotilată in Maramureș, consisting of two parts: a long band forming a cylinder and a round top sewn to the upper edge of the cylinder.
- Caps made of a single piece of fur are also found in Maramureș and Oaș. These are made by stretching the raw fur on a spherical wooden shaped block which makes it take the shape of the head. This simple "skull" cap was formally worn by serfs.
- Căciulă joasă – cylindrical fur cap with the top larger than the base. This is called mocănească, rotată, retezată or turtită and is worn by shepherds on both sides of the southern Carpathians (in Mărginimea Sibiului, Oltenia, Muntenia and Vrancea) and also in Bărăgan Plain and Dobruja due to this area being used for summer pastures by the Carpathian shepherds, and also in Maramureș.

==== Felt hats ====
Hard-felt hats are made by specialized craftsmen in workshops and are worn throughout the year. These hats are found centred on the Saxon regions around Sibiu and Bistrița and may have been introduced into Transylvania by the Saxons, whose craftsmen made them in workshops, from the 18th century. The style varies widely in shape and size of brim according to area. The wide-brimmed hat appeared around the 17th-19th centuries and felt hats with broad brims up to 60 cm were worn in the 19th and early 20th centuries, and continued to be worn in Bistrița Valley, Moldova until the 1940s. Hats with 40 cm brims were worn in central Transylvania and Muntenia. Felt hats with hard upturned brims – cu găng – were worn in Crișana, Hunedoara and Bukovina following a fashion of the gentry. Wide-brimmed felt hats with a large peacock feather (roată de păun) are still worn in Năsăud, further south the hats are much reduced in size, shepherds in Sibiu and along the southern Carpathians wear felt hats with very small brims, the present day fashion tending to do away with the brim altogether.

Green "trilby"-style hats worn by Romanian border guards and mountain corps are still found in Pădureni and other areas today. This style originated in the Austrian Tyrol, reached Romania during Habsburg rule, and became international due to the Habsburg's preference for wearing Tyrolese costume for hunting throughout their Empire. This style is now widespread for everyday use.

==== Straw hats ====
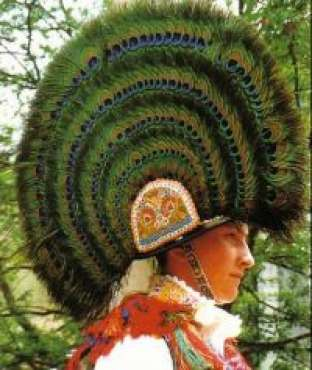
Clop ornated with peacock feathers

Straw hats are worn by men (and women) throughout Romania in the summer. Straw hats vary in style from region to region although regional differences are now becoming less common as the straw version of the trilby takes over.

In Maramureș, traditional straw hats (clop, pl. clopuri) are very small, while in Satu Mare, Arad, Transylvanian Plain hats have a high crown. The tallest – around 30 centimetres (12 in) – can be found in Codru. In Oltenia and Teleorman, along the Danube, flat-brimmed straw hats with rounded crowns are worn. In Maramureș and Oaș Country, men also often wear their "clopuri" in the winter.

== Women's clothing ==
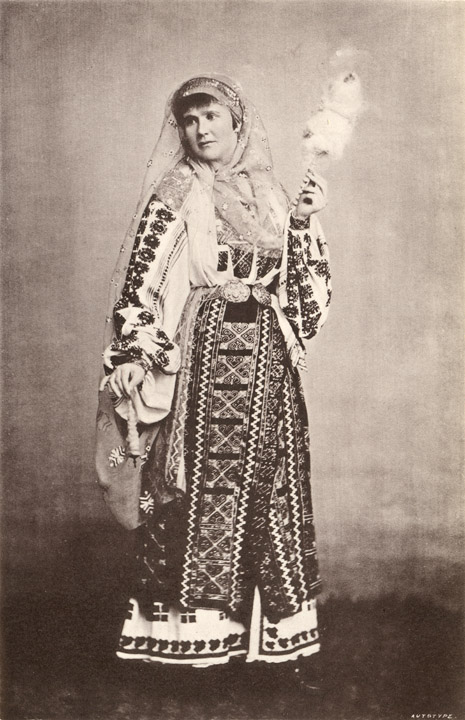
Elisabeth of Wied, Queen of Romania, in a complete national costume

=== Ie ===
Ie is the type of blouse, or shirt of a typical gathered form of the collar, which has existed since ancient times. It is also known as the "Carpathian shirt", similar to the Slavic (Bulgarian, Serbian, Ukrainian, etc.) peoples. The three-part decor code of this pleated shirt is almost always the same: in addition to the upper arm embroidery, the altiță (derived from Serbian ла̏тица), there is a single horizontal row on the sleeve, known as increț, and diagonal stripes below the armpit and shoulder, the râuri. The upper arm embroidery characterizes the entire costume; it is traditionally seen as the culmination of embroidery and decoration. Each blouse tells a compelling story about the region it comes from through the symbols and colours used.

=== Fotă ===
The fotă is a richly ornamented wrap-around skirt made out of a rectangular piece of woollen fabric worn at the waist. Alternately, it can be made of two pieces of woven material that cover the front of the body (like an apron) and the back. The fotă has several names, according to the ethnographic region: pestelcă (in Muntenia), opreg, vălnic and zăvelcă (in Oltenia), catrință or cretință (in Moldova), păstură and zadie (in Transylvania), peștiman (in Bessarabia).

The fotă is made of woollen material or cotton mixed with wool, woven on four heddles. It fully covers the underskirt (poale) except for, in some areas, the hem. The oldest fote were made of black or greyish brown fabric using the natural colours of the wool. The earliest decoration was a red border (bete roșii) at the lower edge and on the front edge, which strengthened the fabric. This type of fotă is still found in north Moldova where fote made of hemp or flax were formerly worn in some parts in summer. Fote with vertical stripes (vâstre) are also common in this area. The extent of the decoration becomes more elaborate as one moves south. The stripes change from simple woven decoration to alternately simple stripes and stripes of woven motifs (alesăture). In Muntenia, the stripes are replaced by compact woven decoration or heavy geometric embroidery, covering the whole surface except for the area which is overlapped in the front. The richest decoration is found in Argeș and Muscel zones where the fotă itself is occasionally made from silk, and the woven decoration is in gold or silver thread.

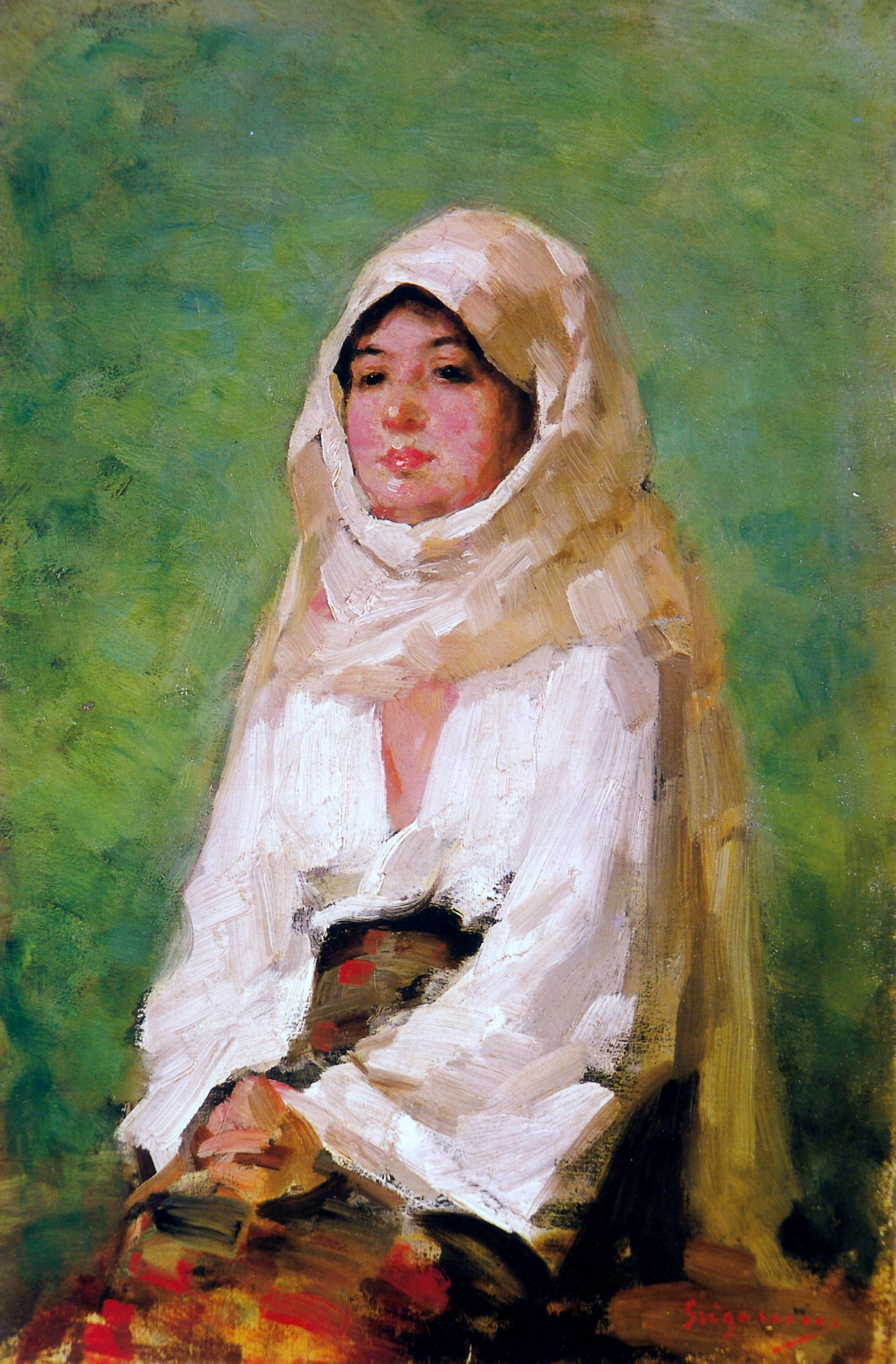
A Romanian girl with maramă on the head. Painting by Nicolae Grigorescu

=== Maramă ===
The maramă is a garment that covers the head, and is mainly worn in southern Romania, southern Moldova and southern Transylvania. Marama is decorated with white patterns woven onto a white background and often grouped toward the ends. In Argeș, the patterns can include coloured geometric motifs.

After the wedding ritual – "bride's binders", "bride undressing" – the godmother traditionally gifts the bride a basma or maramă.

== See also ==
- Hora (dance)
- Folklore of Romania
- Ukrainian national clothing
- Serbian traditional clothing
- Macedonian national costume

== Notes ==
- Dicționarul explicativ al limbii române (DEX), Academia Română, Institutul de Lingvistică "Iorgu Iordan", Editura Univers Enciclopedic, 1998
