= Nathanael of Ohrid =

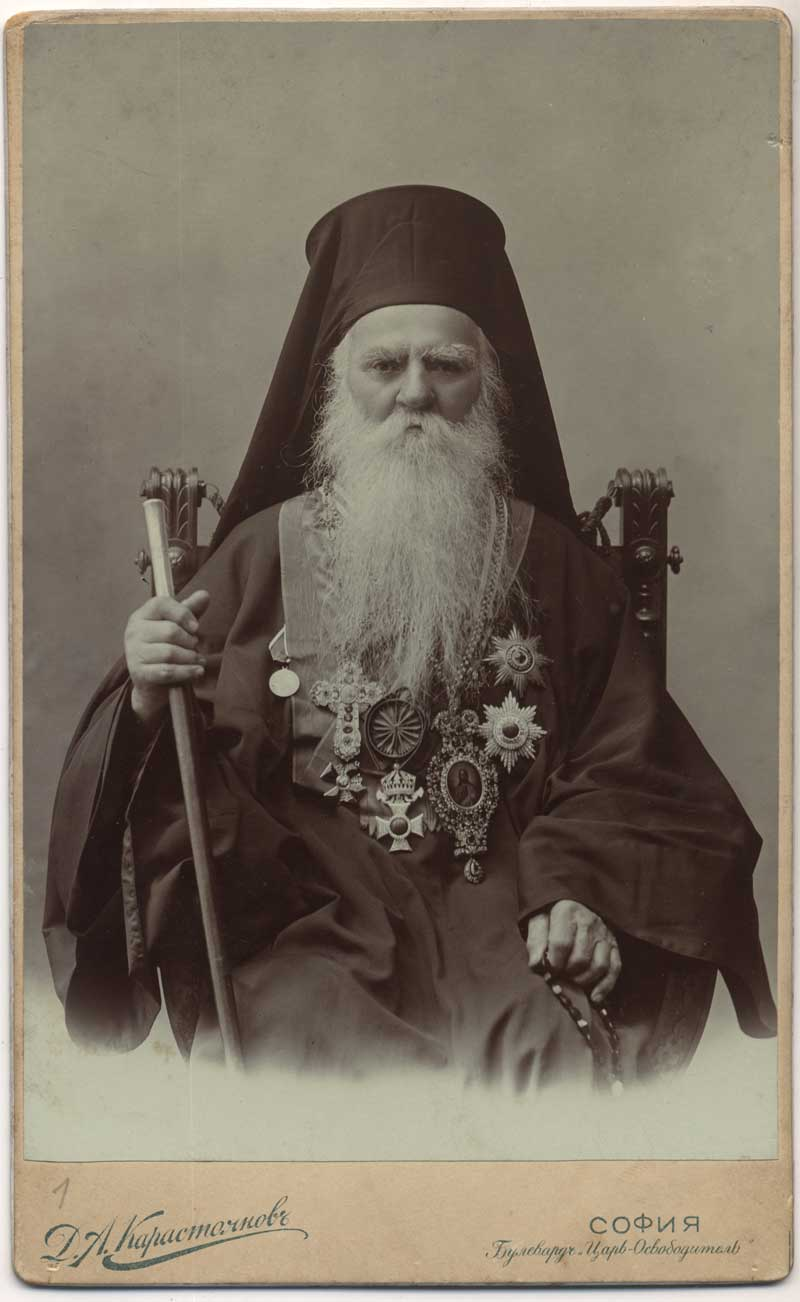
Metropolitan Nathanael of Ohrid (1820-1906)

Nathanael of Ohrid, Nathanael of Plovdiv or Nathanael of Zograf, born Nesho Stanov Boykikev; (Bulgarian/Macedonian: Натанаил Охридски; 26 October 1820 – 18 September 1906) was a Bulgarian cleric, writer and revolutionary from Macedonia, one of the first supporters of literature in modern Bulgarian (as opposed to Church Slavonic) and one of the early figures of the Bulgarian National Revival.

== Biography ==
Nathanael was born as Nesho (Nedyalko) Stoianov (Stankov) Boykikev in the village of Kučevište, near Skopje, then the Ottoman Empire. He studied at the Kučevište monastery, and in 1835 went to study in Samokov. Then he continued his education in Prilep, where along with teacher George Samurkashev translate into Bulgarian language the treatise "The Ceremonies of Jews and their evil", published in 1839 by Theodosius of Sinai.

In 1837 Boykikev become a monk in Zograf Monastery, named Nathanael. One year later he went to Chişinău, to study in the local theological school. He continued his education at the Theological Seminary in Odessa, Russia. In 1840-1841 he took part in translating of "Christian Mirror", printed in Moscow in 1847. He graduated from Kiev Theological Academy in 1851 with a thesis on the medieval Bulgarian Orthodox Church history.

Nathanael published the book "A friendly letter by Bulgarian to Greek" in 1853 (Prague, Church Slavonic language). He was a ministry of Dobrovets Monastery in Moldova in 1854-1869. In 1863 along with Ivan Seliminski arhimandrit Nathanael was a Bulgarian delegate in Moravia in the celebration of 1000 years of work of Saints Cyril and Methodius. Nathanael published in 1865 "Slav-Bulgarian primer" (Bucharest) and "Incident in Skopje Eparchy" (Brăila), which describes anti-Greek clerical and cultural movement of the Bulgarians in northern Macedonia.

Within the Bulgarian Exarchate, Nathanael was bishop in Ohrid in 1874-1880. During September and October 1878, he sent representatives to Bulgaria to collect money and weapons in preparation for the Kresna-Razlog Uprising. During the uprising, between late 1878 and early 1879, he coordinated the distribution of money, rifles, and ammunition from Bulgarian areas. In a letter to the Bulgarian Assembly, he wrote about the necessity to restore national unity based on the San Stefano treaty and to liberate the Bulgarians in Macedonia "from the heavy burden of the Turkish yoke". Nathanael was bishop of Lovech from 1880 to 1891, and from 1891 until his death was Metropolitan of Plovdiv.

Nathanael was a full member of the Bulgarian Learned Society (Bulgarian Academy of Sciences).

== See also ==
- Kresna-Razlog Uprising

== Sources ==
- Енциклопедия "Българската възрожденска интелигенция. Учители, свещеници, монаси, висши духовници, художници, лекари, аптекари, писатели, издатели, книжари, търговци, военни..."(Съставители: проф. д-р Николай Генчев, Красимира Даскалова), С. 1988, с. 446-447
- Натанаил Охридски - Борба за България, ISBN 954071432X Веска Топалова, Издател:УИ "Св. Климент Охридски", 2003.

== Enternal links ==
- Writings (in Bulgarian)
