= Macedonian national costume =

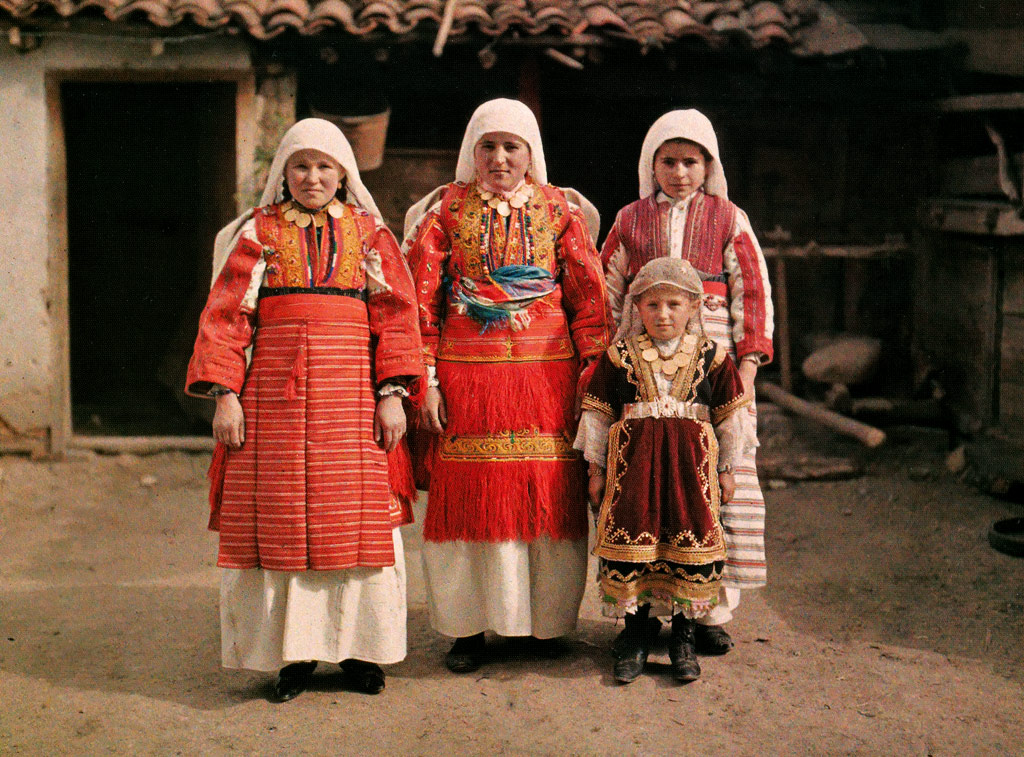
Women from Smilevo wearing national costumes in 1913

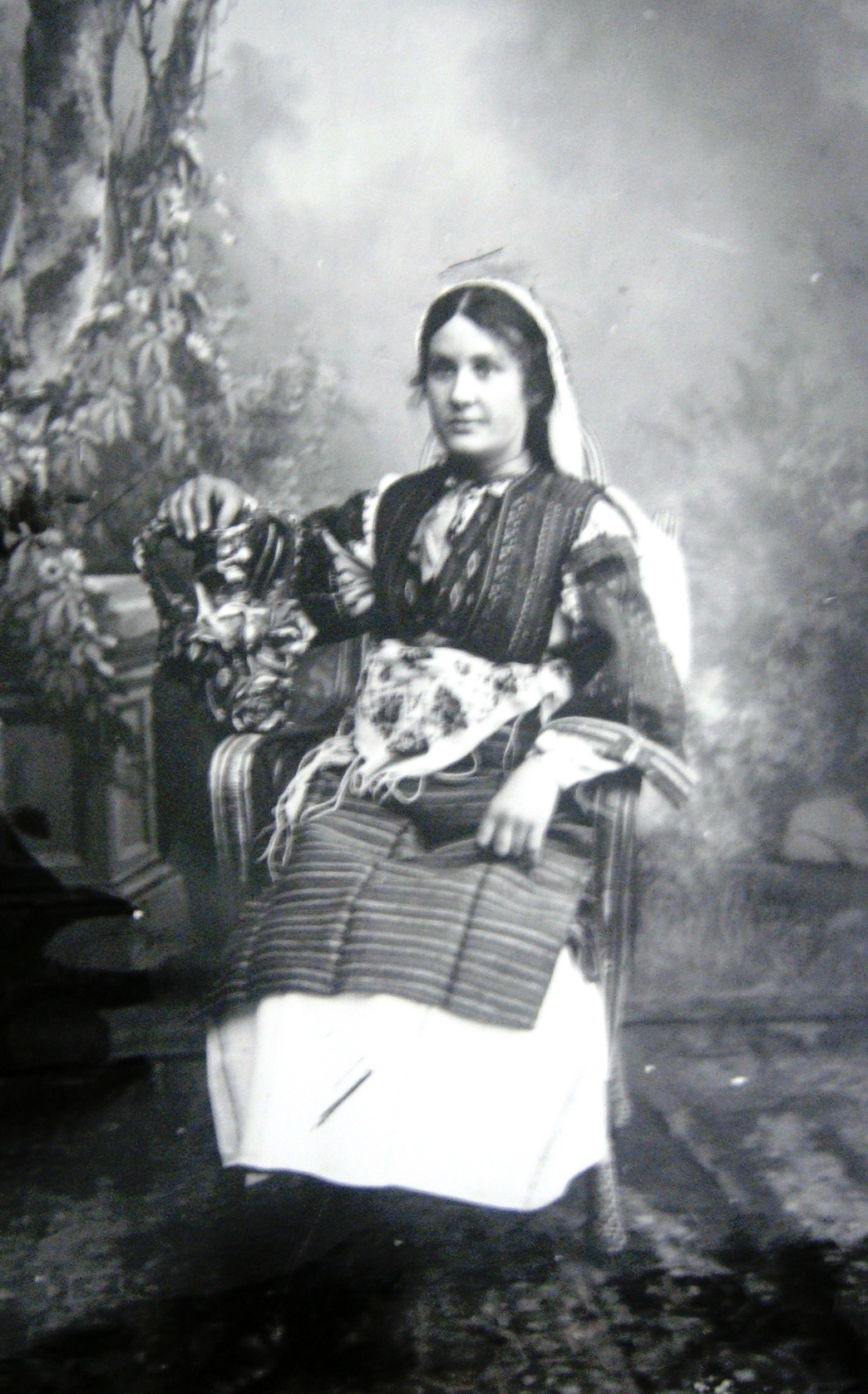
Woman from Bitola, dressed in traditional costume from Smilevo, photographed in the studio of the brothers Manaki in Bitola, between 1898 and 1912

Macedonian national costumes are part of the material culture of the Macedonian people and they are an important branch of the Macedonian folk art.

== Types ==
Macedonians wore 70 different types of national costumes, depending on the region where people lived, such as: Skopska Blatija, Skopska Crna Gora, Upper Polog, Lower Polog, Prilep-Bitola Plain, Upper Prespa, Lower Prespa, Ohrid Plain, Struga Plain, Drimkol, Malesija, Mariovo, Ovče Pole, Malesevo and many others. Every type of folk costume has its own characteristics, but common for all is the presence of the red, black and the white colour and the geometrical shapes on it.

== Gallery ==
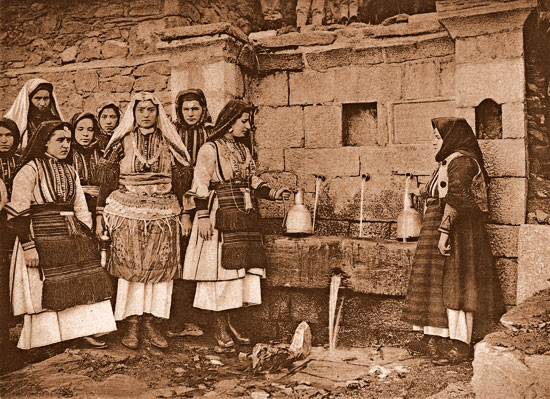
Folk costumes from Galičnik, Mala i Dolna Reka

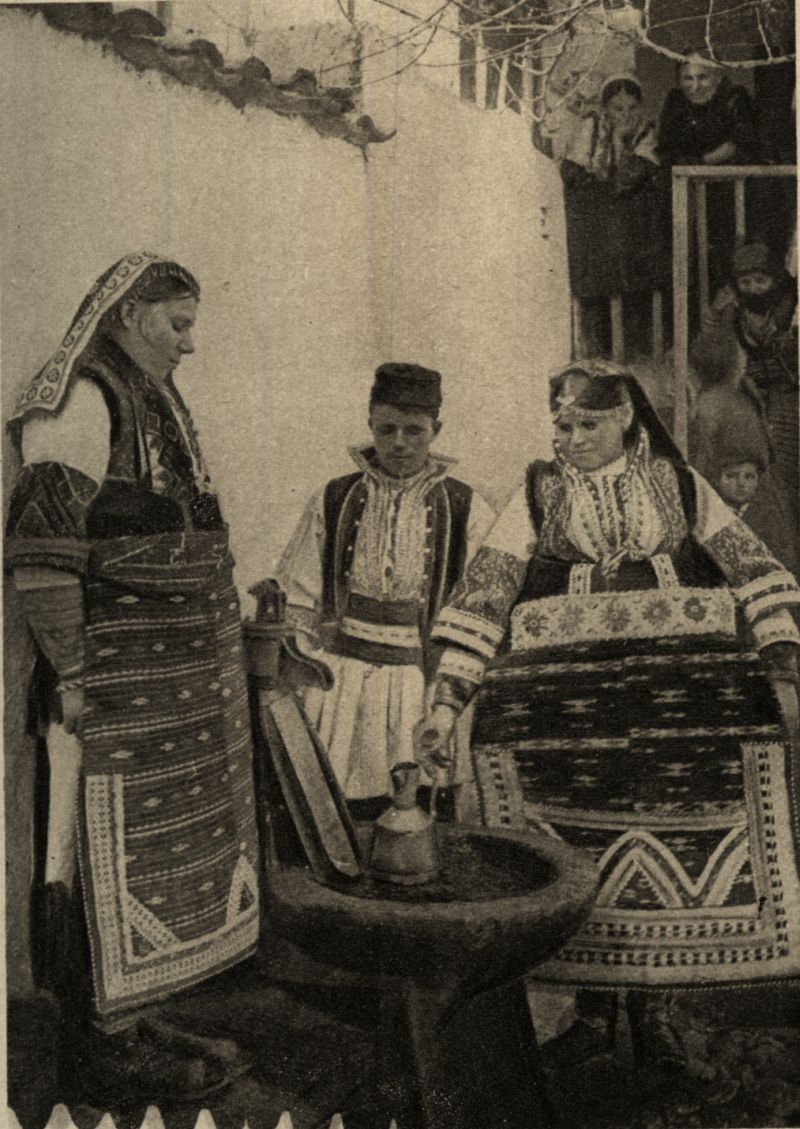
Folk costumes from Prilep Plain

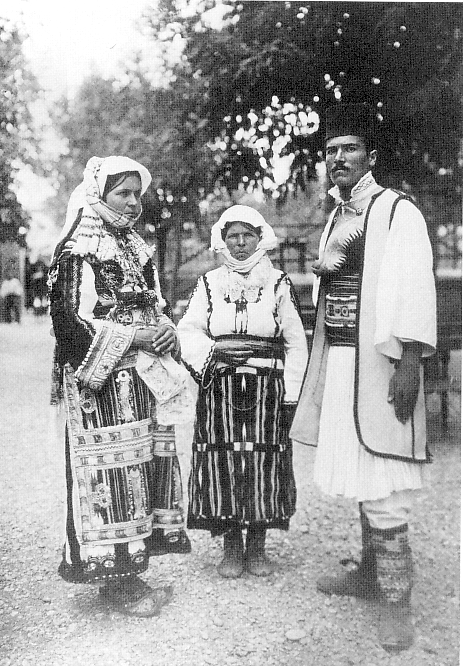
Folk costumes from Kučevište, Skopska Crna Gora

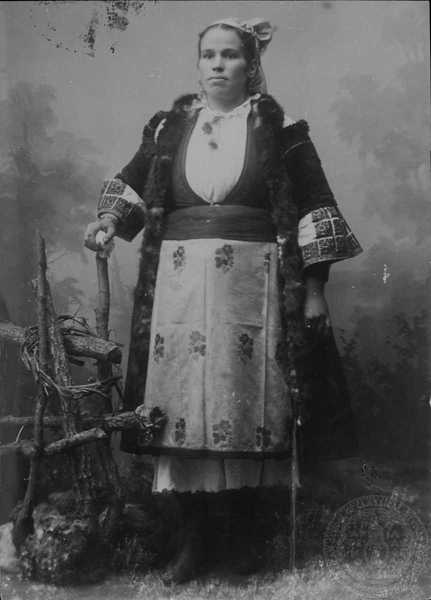
Folk costume from Jankovec, Upper Prespa

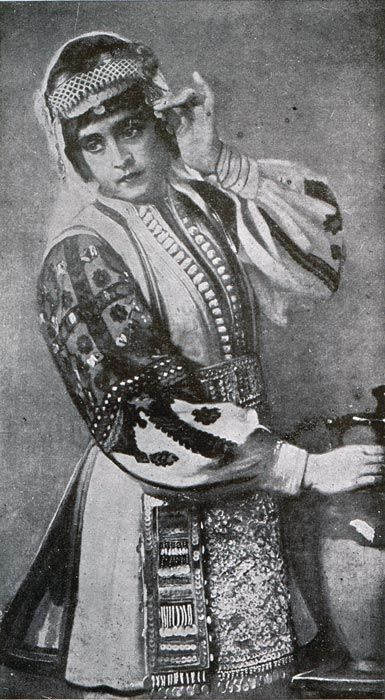
Folk costume from Gostivar, Upper Polog

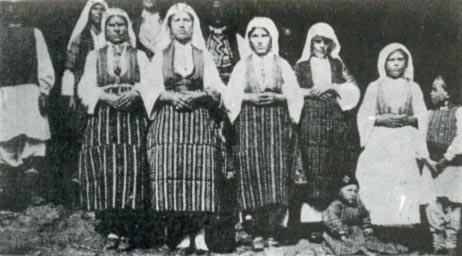
Folk costumes from Kališta, Struga Drimkol

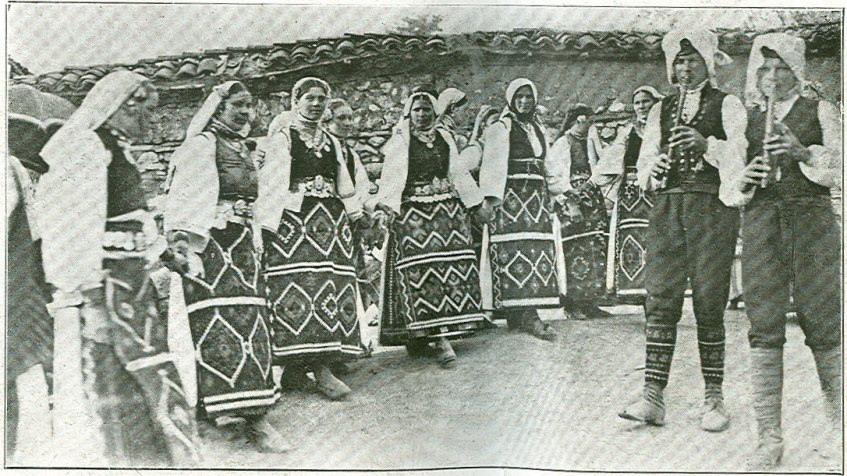
Traditional dance oro in Romanovce, Žegligovo

== See also ==
- Serbian national costume
- Croatian national costume
