= Kiril Peychinovich =

Bulgarian writer and cleric (c. 1770–1845)

Kiril Peychinovich Кирил Пейчинович Кирил Пејчиновиќ Kiril Pejčinovikj
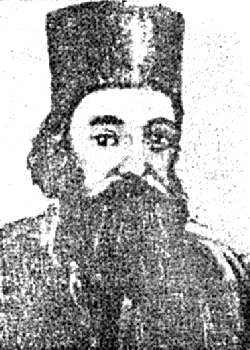
- Born: c. 1771; Tearce, Ottoman Empire
- Died: 12 March 1845; Lešok, Ottoman Empire
- Occupations: Cleric and writer
- Writing career
- Pen name: "Tetoec"
- Genre: Religion
- Notable works: Ogledalo and Utešenie Grešnim

Kiril Peychinovich or Kiril Pejčinović (Bulgarian: Кирил Пейчинович, Serbian: Кирил Пејчиновић, Macedonian: Кирил Пејчиновиќ, Church Slavonic: Күриллъ Пейчиновићь; c. 1771 – 12 March 1845) was a Bulgarian cleric and writer. He was one of the early figures of the Bulgarian National Awakening.

== Life ==
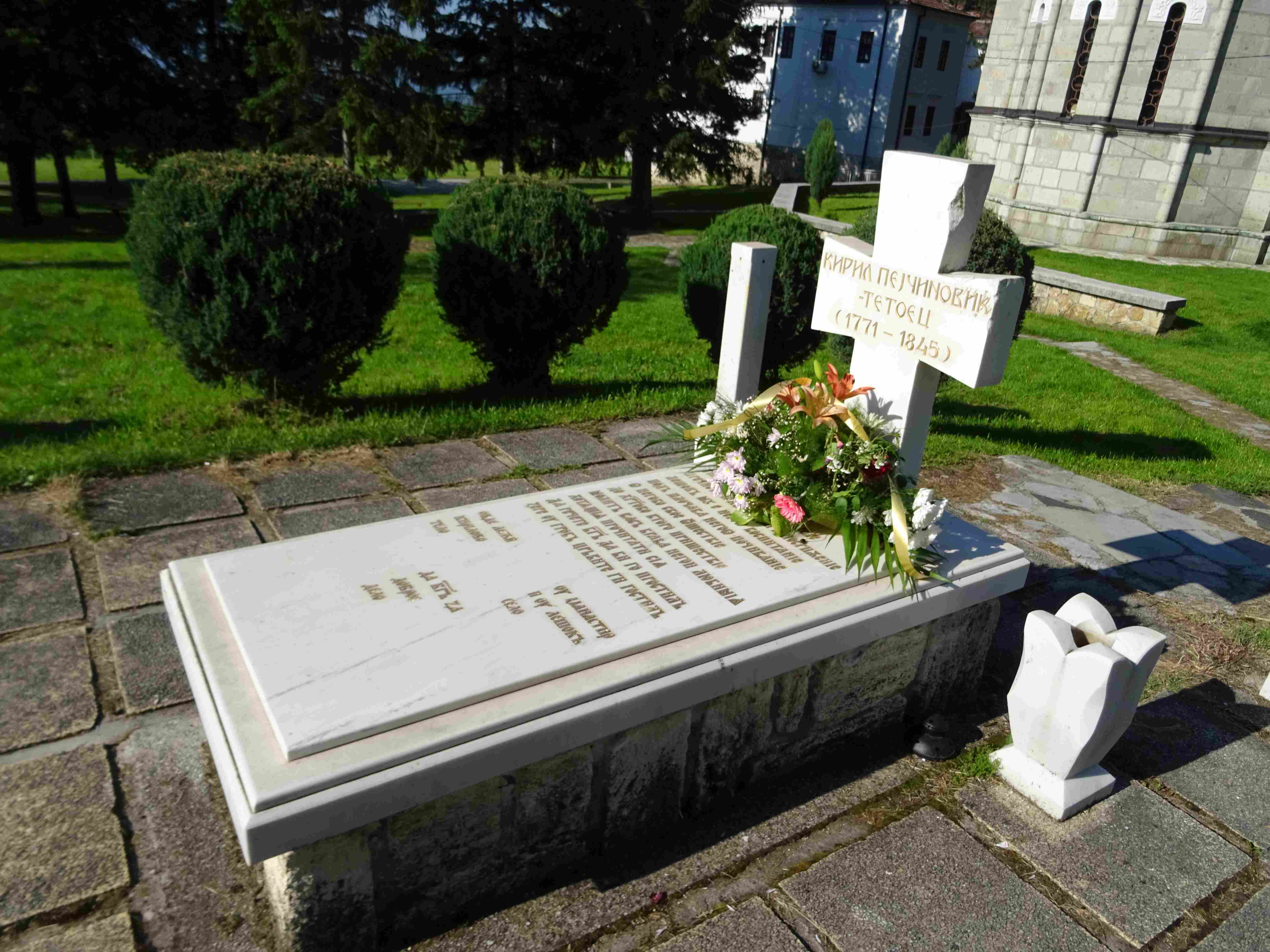
Tomb of Kiril Peychinovich

Peychinovich was born in the large Polog village of Tearce in the Ottoman Empire (present-day North Macedonia) in 1771. He studied in the nearby village of Lešok. Together with his father Peychin and his uncle Dalmant, he went to Mount Athos, at the monastery of Hilandar, where all three became monks. Afterwards, he returned to Tetovo and worked in the Kičevo Monastery. In 1801, he became abbot of Marko's Monastery near Skopje. He had the neglected monastery restored. After visiting his father and uncle in Hilandar, he left the monastery and returned to his native village with the goal to restore the monastery of St. Athanasius in Lešok. In 1818, he moved to the monastery, which he restored with funding from the Serbian prince Miloš Obrenović. Here he opened a school and made an attempt to create a printing house. Peychinovich developed educational activities, guiding and encouraging younger monks to education, delivering sermons, and writing books. He assisted Theodosius of Sinai in restoring his printing house in Thessaloniki with funds, which had been burnt down. Peychinovich died on 12 March 1845 in the Lešok Monastery and was buried in the churchyard.

== Works and views ==
Peychinovich authored three books, two printed and one manuscript (Zhitie i Sluzhba na Tsar Lazar), all three devoted to religion. He also authored one of the first Bulgarian books. Peychinovich wrote in the Tetovo dialect and with less Church Slavonicisms than fellow contemporary Yoakim Karchovski. His Sermon for the Holidays (Slovo za praznicite) was written in a vernacular with a high amount of Turkisms, although there are many Church Slavonic words. According to Slavist Peter Hill, his purpose was to promote religious works among believers, thus Peychinovich's aims were religious, rather than linguistic. With his teachings, he wanted, among other things, to protect his readers from so-called superstition, i.e. from non-Christian mythical beliefs and rituals.

Peychinovich defined his language as "Bulgarian", and the region he lived in as "Lower Moesia". He also used the term "našinci" (ours) to refer to his compatriots. Furthermore, in his letter to Miloš Obrenović, he mentions that he dared to address him "out of spiritual love and our Serbian fatherland", after which he invokes the prayers of Serbian saints, just as he does at the end of his "Ogledalo". Per Blaže Koneski, these details demonstrate that he and his contemporaries lacked a clear sense of national belonging.

=== Ogledalo ===
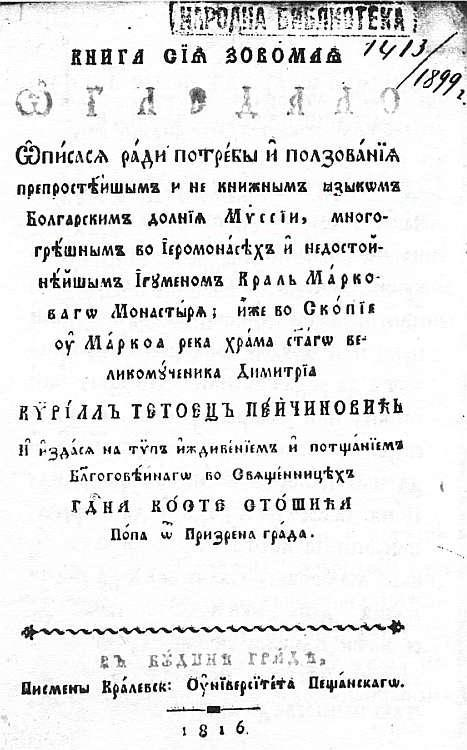
Ogledalo's title page

Ogledalo ("Mirror") has a form of a sermon with a liturgical-ascetical character. It is an original work, inspired by the Kolivari (also called Filokalist) movement on Mount Athos, that was fighting for a liturgical renewal within the Eastern Orthodox Church on the Balkans. For this aim the Kolivari were using the spoken language of the people, according to the region where they were translating and writing. The most important topics of the work are: the significance of the liturgical life, the preparation for the Holy Communion, the regularly receiving of the Holy Communion. Especially important is his argumentation against the superstition and on the importance of the individual ascetic life and the participation in the liturgical life of the Church. In addition, a collection of Christian prayers and instructions, some of which were written by him were added in the end of the work. It was printed in 1816 in Budapest. The prayers and verses from the Bible were written in Church Slavonic, while the sermons were written mainly in the Tetovo dialect.

Per him, it was written "because of the need and the use in the simplest and not literary Bulgarian language of lower Moesia" (ради потреби и ползования препростейшим и не книжним eзиком болгарским долния Миссии). Apart from defining his language as Bulgarian, he defined the region he lived in as Lower Moesia. At the end of the book, he honoured Serbian saints Simeon and Sava.

=== Utesheniе Greshnim ===
Peychinovich's second book, Utesheniе Greshnim ("Solace of the sinner"), much like his first, is a Christian collection of instructions — including advice on how weddings should be organised and how those who had sinned should be consoled, as well as a number of instructive tales.

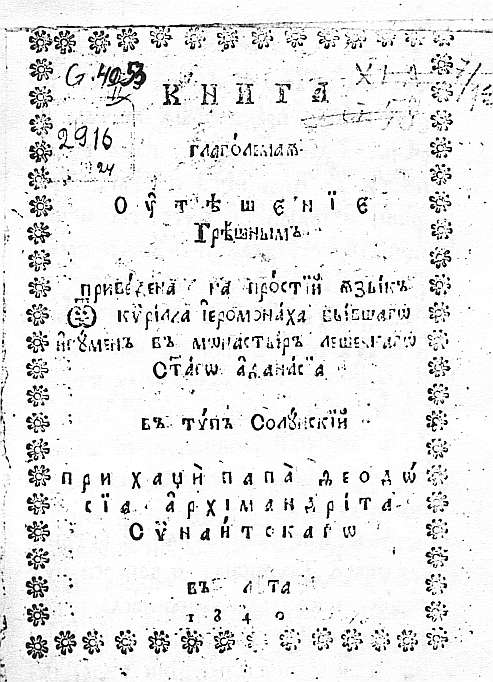
Utesheniе Greshnim's title page

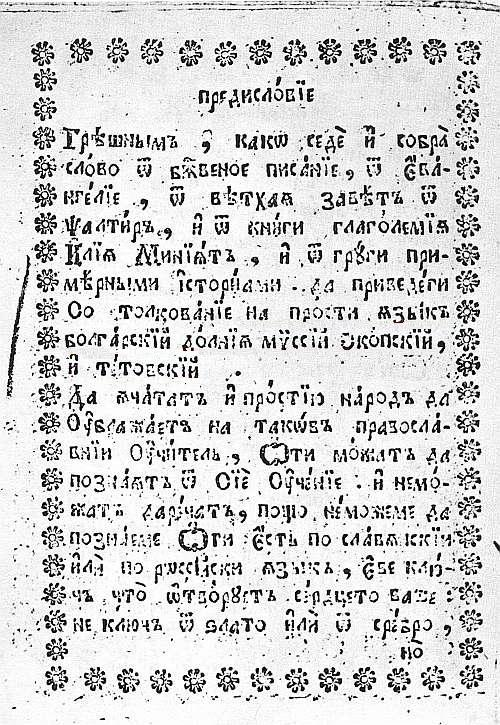
Foreword to Peychinovich's Utesheniya Greshnim

Utesheniе Greshnim was ready to be printed in 1831, as specified by him in a note in the original manuscript. Peychinovich sent three letters to Obrenović. In the first letter, he requested material support for the book. In the third letter, Peychinovich wrote that he dared to address the Serbian prince "because of spiritual love and our Serbian fatherland". The book was sent to Kragujevac to be printed, but this did not happen because it contained many Turkish loanwords and formal weaknesses, and became a subject of Church censorship. The Metropolitanate of Belgrade also disliked the simple terms that Peychinovich used about divine matters. At the beginning of 1836, Peychinovich was informed that his book will not be published. Тhe book was sent to be printed in Thessaloniki four years later, in 1840, by Theodosius of Sinai. In the preface, Theodosius expressed his gratitude for the assistance he received from Peychinovich, referring to the language of the work as the 'common Bulgarian language of Lower Moesia from Skopje and Tetovo' (простїй Ѧзыкъ болгарский долнїѦ Мүссїи Скопсский и Тетовский).

=== Epitaph ===
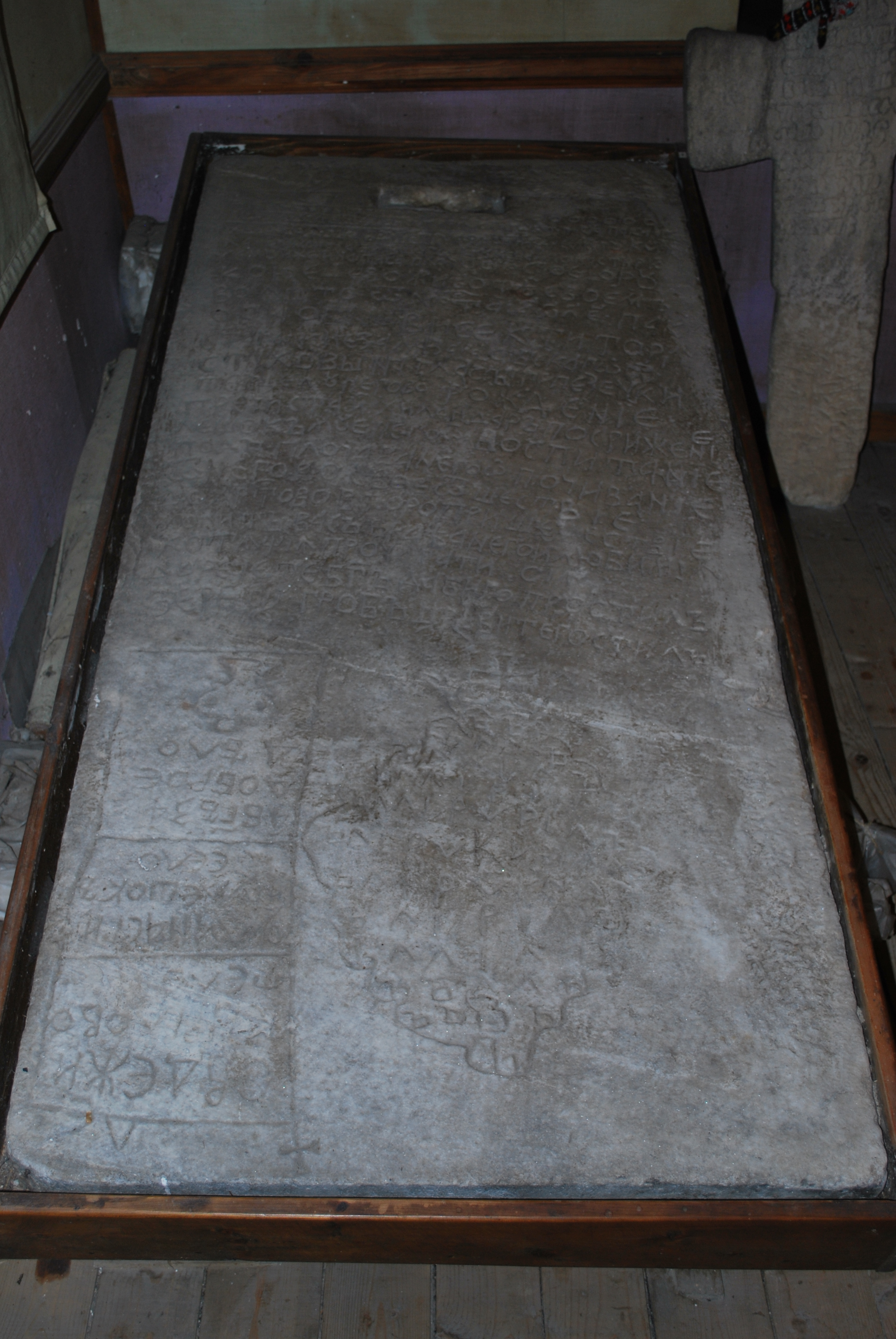
The original tombstone of Kiril Peychinovich

In 1835, Peychinovich composed an epitaph for himself, which was engraved on his tombstone. His epitaph commemorates the main moments of his life, expressing his resignation with death. It is written in rhyming verses.

Теарце му негово рождение
Пречиста и Хилендар пострижение
Лешок му е негоо воспитание
Под плочава негоо почивание
От негово свое отшествие
До Христово второ пришествие
Молит вас бракя негои любимия
Хотящия прочитати сия
Да речете Бог да би го простил
Зере у гроб цръвите ги гостил

(Tearce is his birth
Prechista and Hilendar monasticism
Leshok is his upbringing
Under the slab his resting
From his own departure
Until the second coming of Christ
I beg you, his beloved brothers
Whoever wants to read this
Say that God would forgive him
Because at the grave worms visited him)

Овде лежи Кирилово тело
У манастир и у Лешок село
Да Бог за доброе дело

(Here lies Kiril's body
At the monastery and at the village of Leshok
May God be for a good deed)

== Legacy ==
In 1934, the village of Burumli in Byala Municipality, Ruse Province, Bulgaria, was renamed Peychinovo in the writer's honour. Peychinovich is considered as one of the early figures of the Bulgarian National Awakening. In North Macedonia, he is considered an ethnic Macedonian and a founder of modern Macedonian literature. Bulgarian critics consider such statements to be a falsification of Peychinovich's lifework, noting that claims that he was one of the first Macedonian authors to print books in vernacular Macedonian directly contradict Peychinovich's own words that he was writing in the vernacular and non-literary Bulgarian language of Lower Moesia. In Serbia, he is considered as a Serbian cleric and writer.

Peychinovich's remains were reburied four times. His original tombstone was hidden from the Serbian army during the First Balkan War and then returned after the war, until it was replaced with one in Macedonian in 1967 and moved to the memorial room in Lešok Monastery. His grave was partially damaged during the armed conflict in 2001 but it was renewed. In October 2022, he was canonised by the Macedonian Orthodox Church as a saint under the name Kiril Lešočki, setting 25 March as the day of celebration. In response, Bulgarian historian Plamen Pavlov referred to his canonisation as a Macedonian saint as deeply disrespectful of Peychinovich's real life and work and bordering on blasphemy, given that Thou shalt not lie and Thou shalt not steal are among the core tenets of Christianity.
