= Lešok =

Lešok Лешок
- Village
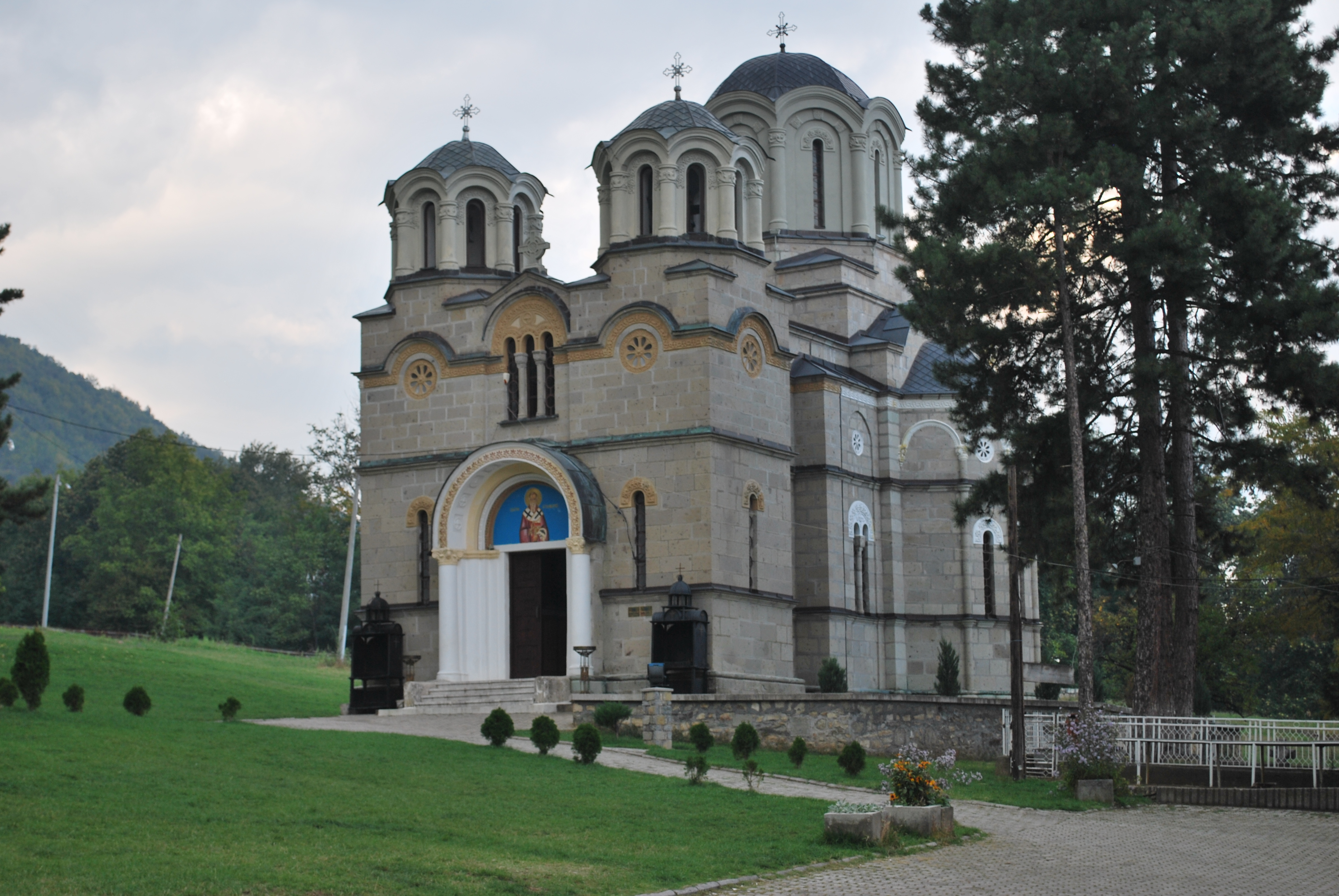
- Lešok Monastery

- Location within North Macedonia
- Coordinates: 42.062000°N 21.031210°E
- Country: North Macedonia
- Region: Polog
- Municipality: Tearce

Population (2021)
  - Total: 696
- Time zone: UTC+1 (CET)
  - Summer (DST): UTC+2 (CEST)
- Car plates: TE
- Website: .

Lešok (Macedonian: Лешок, Albanian: Leshkë) is a village in the municipality of Tearce, North Macedonia.

== History ==
Lešok is attested in the 1467/68 Ottoman tax registry (defter) for the Nahiyah of Kalkandelen. The village had a total of 200 Christian households, 11 bachelors and 22 widows.

According to a 1467-68 Ottoman defter, the inhabitants of Lešok exhibited mostly Slavic and minority Albanian anthroponymy. Some families had mixed Slavic-Albanian anthroponymy. The settlement had two Orthodox Albanian priests who served in the Slavic-speaking church.

The village is known for its monastery where the cleric and writer Kiril Pejcinović operated. The monastery had a library and Lešok was a literature and educational center. Because of that, at the end of the 19th century, a feud started growing between the Bulgarian and Serbian churches regarding the ownership of the monastery, with both institutions asserting their claims to it. According to the monks residing there in 1901, the abbot Ezekiel—who identified as a "pure-blooded Macedonian" and opposed the Serbian and Bulgarian agitators—was ultimately murdered in 1898 by "foreign agitators".

According to the Bulgarian ethnographer Vasil Kanchov in 1900, the village was inhabited by 540 Bulgarians.

According to the German historian and geographer Wilfried Krallert in his map published in 1941, Lešok was inhabited by 650 Macedonians in 1931.

== Demographics ==
As of the 2021 census, Lešok had 696 residents with the following ethnic composition:

- Macedonians 381
- Albanians 280
- Romani 2
- Serbs 1
- Others 11
- Persons for whom data are taken from administrative sources 21

According to the 2002 census, the village had a total of 440 inhabitants. Ethnic groups in the village include:

- Macedonians 435
- Serbs 1
- Others 4
