= Daskal Kamche =

Kamche Nikov PopAngelov
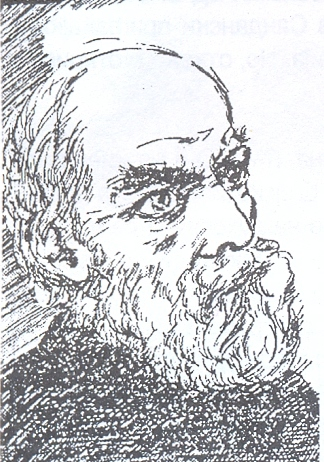
- Born: c. 1790; Korešnica, Ottoman Empire, (today Republic of North Macedonia)
- Died: c. 1848; Vatasha, Ottoman Empire, (today Republic of North Macedonia)
- Other name: Daskal Kamche

Kamche Nikov Popangelov (Bulgarian: Камче Ников Попангелов, Macedonian: Камче Ников Поп Ангелов, c. 1790 – c. 1848), widely known as Daskal Kamche, was a Bulgarian teacher, printer and engraver, founder of one of the first printing houses for books in Bulgarian in the Ottoman Empire.

== Biography ==
Daskal Kamche was born in the village of Korešnica, which is close to Demir Kapija, a town in the Tikvesh region of Macedonia. He was born in a poor family, that in the early 19th century moved to Vatasha. He started school there, but due to the family's financial problems, he left and he learned the alphabet by himself. He was a natural when it comes to singing, so he then became a church singer in the Vatasha church. He went as a pilgrim to the monasteries in Mount Athos, where he eventually stayed for one year. After he came back from Saint Aton, he became a taksidiot-monk for some of the monasteries in Tikvesh. He was a close friend with Theodosius of Sinai, who also happened to print Kamche's first and only book "Short description of 20 Mount Athos Monasteries". The purpose of this book was to help Tikvesh region inhabitants with the directions to and their religious stay in one of the 20 Mount Athos monasteries.

Daskal Kamche started to work as a teacher in the village of Vatasha in 1828. With some financial help from Yovko Markov and Theodosius of Sinai, a rich citizen of Kavadarci, he purchased a printing press of type Gutenberg and installed it in his home in Vatasha furtively. Daskal Kamche used the press for about a year, until he was expelled from Vatasha by the local Greek eparch. His printing press eventually found its way to Solun, where it was used by Theodosius of Sinai for his printing office from 1839 up to 1842 when it was damaged in a fire. 5 years later, again fostered by Jovko Markov, he bought materials and repaired the machine which started working again in 1848 and printed one of Jordan Hadzikonstantinov Dzinot's books. That caused him a lot of problems which made him to settle down as a teacher for the rest of his life. He was known as a fierce opponent of the use of Greek in the local Bulgarian schools and churches. He died in 1848 in Vatasha.

== Sources ==
- Historical Dictionary of Macedonia, Skopje, 2000, p. 142. (in Macedonian: Македонски историски речник, Скопје, 2000, с. 142);
- Encyclopedia Bulgaria, volume 2, Publishing house of the Bulgarian Academy of Sciences, Sofia, 1981. (in Bulgarian): # Енциклопедия България, том 2, Издателство на БАН, София, 1981).
