= Lešok Monastery =

Macedonian Orthodox monastery in Lešok, North Macedonia

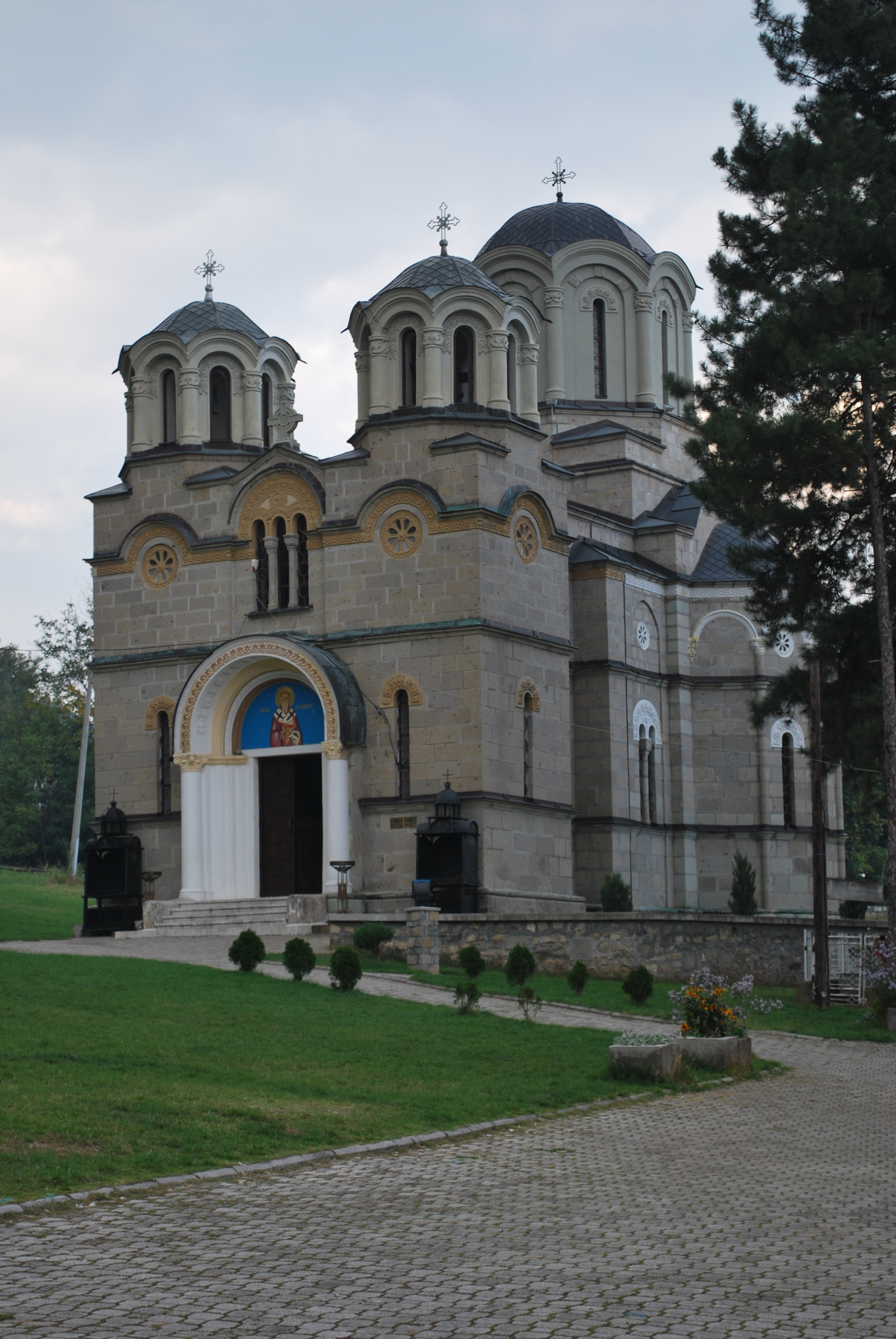
- Interactive map of Lešok Monastery

Monastery information
- Order: Macedonian Orthodox
- Established: 1326
- Dedication: St Athanasius and St Mary
- Diocese: Diocese of Tetovo and Gostivar
- Controlled churches: Church of St Athanasius of Alexandria and Church of the Holy Mother of God

People
- Abbot: Otec Teodosij
- Prior: Kiril Peychinovich

Site
- Location: Lešok, Tearce Municipality
- Coordinates: 42°03′50″N 21°01′58″E
- Public access: yes

The Monastery of Lešok is a monastery, near the village of Lešok in Tearce Municipality, North Macedonia. It is located close to the border with Kosovo. Lying at 638 metres above sea level it is located on the southeastern side of the mountain Šar Planina. In its complex are the churches of St. Athanasius of Alexandria and the Holy Mother of God Church.

The Lešok Monastery developed from an earlier monastic complex located about 500 meters north of the present monastery site. Archaeological surface research suggests that this earlier monastery was relatively small, consisting of modest residential quarters and a small church. Its construction likely began during the reign of the Serbian king Stefan Uroš II Milutin (r. 1282–1321). The development of the monastery as the episcopal seat of the Bishop of Lower Polog was closely connected with the establishment of the Lower Polog Diocese, which functioned under the jurisdiction of the Prizren Metropolitanate. A charter issued in 1326 by Stefan Dečanski mentions the Church of the Holy Mother of God in Lešok as a dependency of the Prizren diocese. The formation of the Lower Polog Diocese is linked to the church council held in Skopje in 1346–1347, when the Serbian Orthodox Church elevated the Peć Archbishopric to the rank of Patriarchate and proclaimed Stefan Dušan as emperor. Around 1347–1348, the hieromonk Anthony was consecrated as bishop with the title of Bishop of Lower Polog, with his seat at the Lešok Monastery. After the Ottoman conquest of the region, there is little historical information about the monastery during the 15th and 16th centuries. Sources also lack records of abbots from the monastery’s foundation in the 14th century until 1818, creating a gap of nearly five centuries following the death of its first known abbot and ktetor, Bishop Joanikije (formerly the hieromonk Anthony).

At the end of the 19th century, a dispute arose between the Bulgarian and Serbian churches regarding the ownership of the monastery, with both institutions asserting their claims to it. According to the monks residing there in 1901, the abbot Ezekiel—who identified as a "pure-blooded Macedonian" and opposed the Serbian and Bulgarian agitators—was ultimately murdered in 1898 by "foreign agitators".

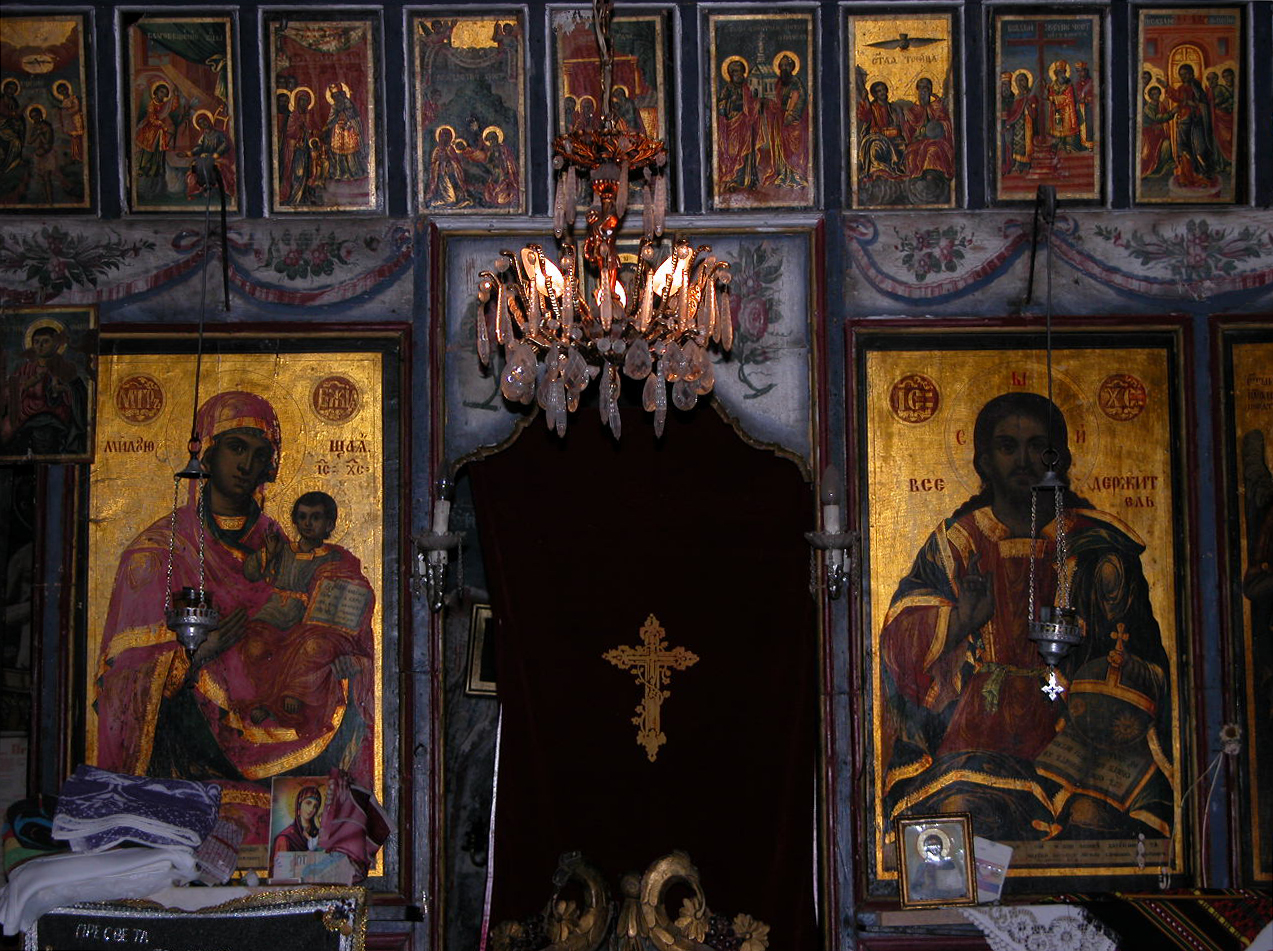
Icons in the Church of the Holy Mother of God

The church of St. Athanasius was built in 1924 next to the Church of the Holy Mother of God. In the yard of the Monastery of Lešok is the tomb of the Bulgarian cleric, writer and enlightener Kiril Peychinovich, who was born in 1770. In his honor, this monastery hosts an International Meeting of Literary Translators. Tetovo is also a host to the Festival of the Macedonian Choirs.

On August 13, during the 2001 Macedonian Insurgency, shortly after the Ohrid Agreement, the monastery was destroyed by an explosive device. Both sides of the conflict denied responsibility. The corpse of a donkey painted with the letters UÇK (The Albanian abbreviation for National Liberation Army) were found next to the rubble though NLA forces within the town had claimed not to have been responsible nor to have been responsible and instead blamed local Macedonians from the town of Rate.

Today the monastery dormitories have been restored and are used to accommodate summer tourists.
