= Ivan Seliminski =

Bulgarian philosopher, scholar, teacher and medical doctor

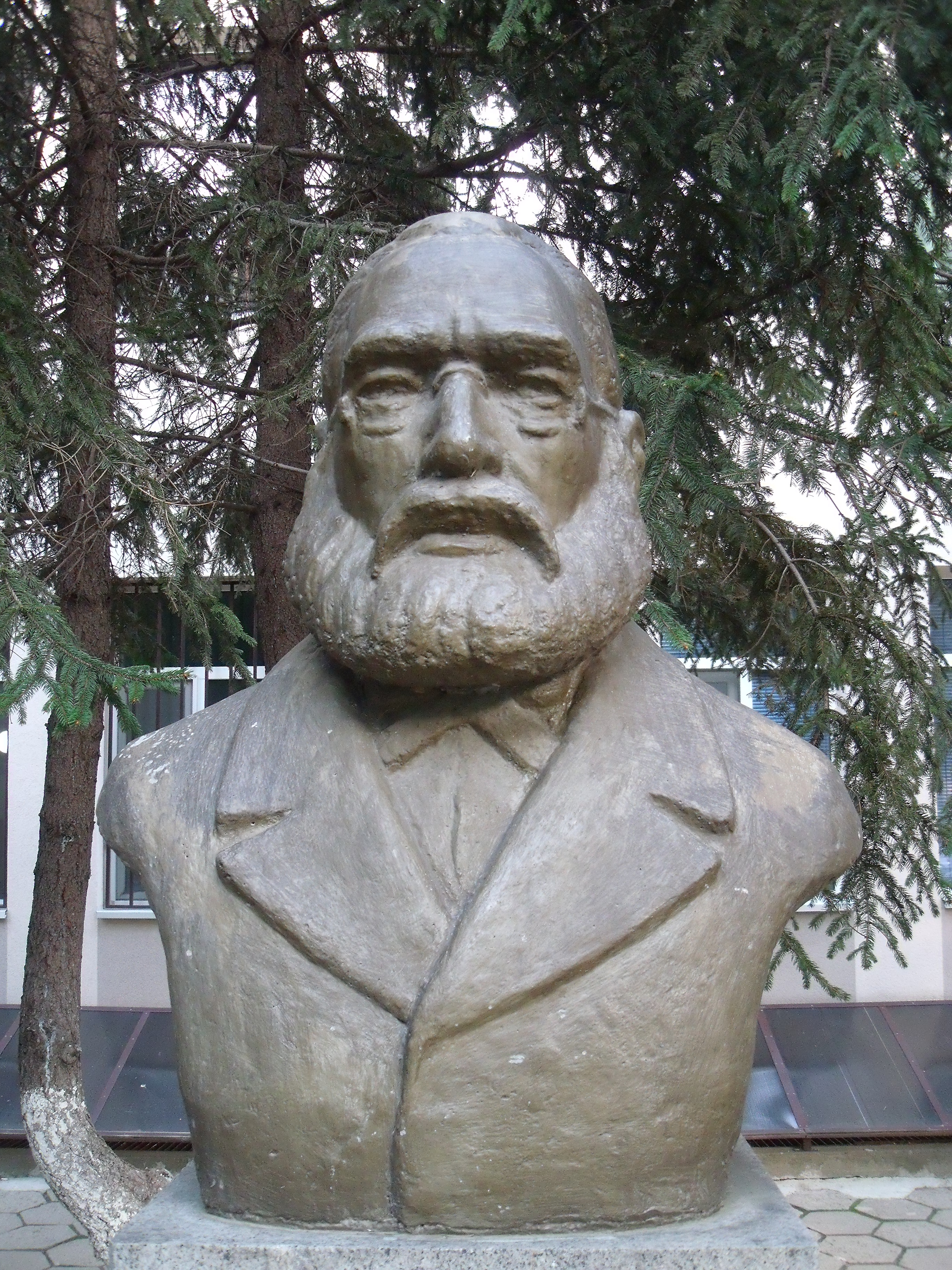
Statue of Ivan Seliminski

Ivan Seliminski (1799 – 1866) was a prominent Bulgarian philosopher, scholar, teacher and medical doctor.

== Education ==
He was born in Sliven in 1799. Later, he took the name of this town as his surname. His early school years were spent in a Greek school in Sliven. His secondary education was in Kidonia. He traveled in Europe.

== Teacher ==
Seliminski returned to Sliven in 1825. He opened a school in which he taught physics. His school became one of the first Bulgarian lower-level secondary schools.

== Evacuation in Bessarabia ==
On the eve of the Russian-Turkish War (1828–1829) he organized many Bulgarians to support the Russian army. With the creation of revolutionary organizations in Sliven and some other cities, Seliminski became the first major Bulgarian revolutionary. After the war Seliminski participated in Russian delegations. Many Bulgarian people left their homes and emigrated to the other side of the Danube in Wallachia. Ivan Seliminski opened a school and was a teacher in New Sliven (now Berjazka) and Bucharest.

== Medical doctor ==
From 1840 to 1844 Seliminski studied medicine in Athens. After that he traveled to Paris (1845) and practiced as a medical doctor in Bucharest, Braila and Bessarabia until the end of his life (1845–1866).
