= Kučevište =

Kučevište Куќевиште Кућевиште
- Village
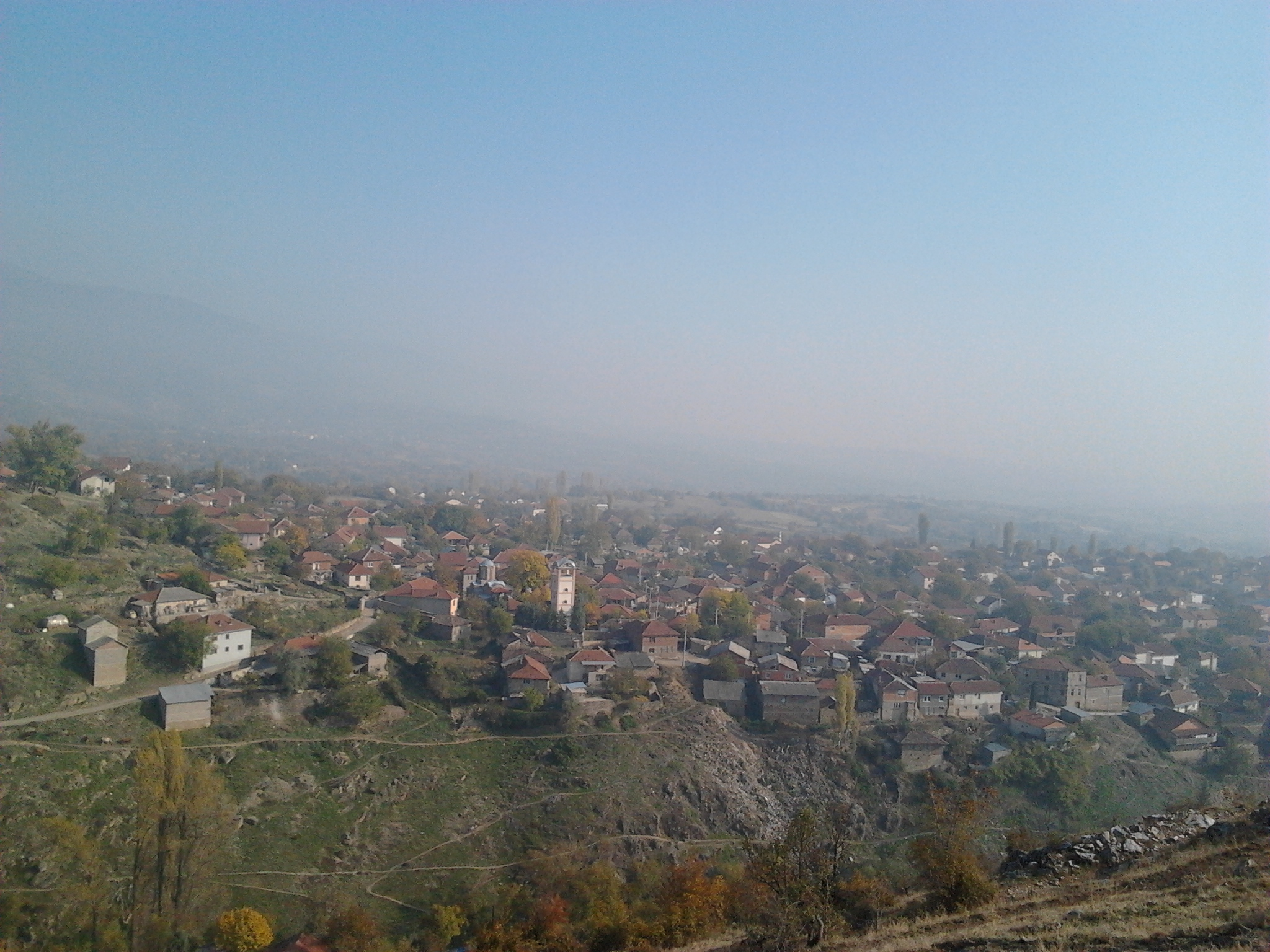

- Location within North Macedonia
- Coordinates: 42.109155°N 21.418064°E
- Country: North Macedonia
- Region: Skopje
- Municipality: Čučer-Sandevo

Population (2021)
  - Total: 4,119
- Time zone: UTC+1 (CET)
  - Summer (DST): UTC+2 (CEST)
- Website: .

Kučevište (Macedonian: Куќевиште; Serbian: Кућевиште) is the largest village in the municipality of Čučer-Sandevo, North Macedonia.

== Demographics ==
As of the 2021 census, Kučevište had 4,119 residents with the following ethnic composition:

- Macedonians 2,404
- Serbs 1,323
- Persons for whom data are taken from administrative sources 180
- Bosniaks 84
- Others 74
- Vlachs 15
- Turks 14
- Roma 7

== Notable personalities ==
- Nathanael of Ohrid
