= List of banks in Lebanon =

This is a list of banks in Lebanon.

== List of banks ==
=== Central bank ===
- Banque du Liban (BDL)

=== List of Banks ===
Lebanese based banks sorted by their significant presence domestically and overseas:

- Bank Audi
- Byblos Bank
- Bank of Beirut
- Bank of Beirut and Arab Countries
- BankMed
- Banque Libano-Française
- Banque Misr Liban (BML)
- BLOM Bank
- BSL Bank
- Cedrus Bank
- Creditbank
- Crédit Libanais
- First National Bank
- Fransabank
- Intercontinental Bank of Lebanon (IBL)
- Lebanon and Gulf Bank
- Saradar Bank
- Bank of Beirut
- Société Générale de Banque au Liban (SGBL)
- Lebanese Swiss Bank
- AM Bank (Al-Mawarid Bank)
- Lebanese Canadian Bank
- Jammal Trust Bank (Under Liquidation)
- CSCBank
- Intra Bank
- Fenicia Bank

=== Foreign banks ===
- Citi
- Arab Bank
- National Bank of Kuwait (Lebanon)

=== Closed banks ===
- Al-Madina Bank

== See also ==
- Economy of Lebanon
- List of banks in the Arab world
