= Lebanon and Gulf Bank =

Financial bank of Lebanon

Bank of Lebanon and the Gulf (LGB Bank SAL, Arabic: بنك لبنان والخليج) is one of the financial banks of Lebanon. it was established in 1963, and was then named (Bank of Credit Agricole). In 1980 the name was changed to (Lebanon and Gulf Bank), after the ownership of its shares was transferred to a new group of Lebanese businessmen.

The bank operates from the headquarter in Beirut Central District, has 18 branches in Lebanon, a branch in Cyprus since1986, another in Iraq, and a representative office in Dubai. Its current general manager is Samer Itani.

== See also ==
- List of Banks in Lebanon
- Banque du Liban
- Bank Audi
- Bank of Beirut and Arab Countries
- First National Bank
- Intercontinental Bank of Lebanon (IBL)
- Economy of Lebanon
