= Bank of Beirut =

Commercial bank based in Beirut, Lebanon

Bank of Beirut S.A.L
- Company type: Commercial bank
- Industry: Banking; Financial services
- Founded: 1963
- Founder: Salim G. Sfeir
- Headquarters: Beirut, Lebanon
- Area served: Middle East; Europe; Australia; Africa
- Key people: Salim G. Sfeir (Chairman CEO); Fawaz H. Naboulsi (Deputy CEO)
- Products: Credit cards; Consumer banking; Corporate banking; Investment banking; Mortgages; Private banking; Wealth management
- Subsidiaries: Bank of Sydney; Bank of Beirut UK; Bank of Beirut Oman; BoB Finance; Beirut Insurance Group
- Website: www.bankofbeirut.com

Bank of Beirut (Arabic: بنك بيروت) is a bank in Beirut, Lebanon. Bank of Beirut was founded in 1963 as Realty Business Bank S.A.L. and in 1970, changed its name to the current name. In 1993, a group of bankers and businessmen headed by Salim Sfeir, the current chairman and CEO, acquired the five-branch bank, which ranked 35 out of the 71 banks operating that year, and in 1997, Bank of Beirut was listed on the Beirut Stock Exchange.

== Expansion ==
In 1997, a strategic alliance was formed with Emirates NBD; later in 2001 Bank of Beirut opened a representative office in Dubai to serve expatriates in the GCC. In 2002, a branch was opened in Limassol, Cyprus regulated by the Central Bank of Cyprus (and closed in Dec2023), followed by the opening of a representative office in Lagos, Nigeria in 2004 and in Accra. 3 branches opened in Oman, Sohar in 2008, Ghobra in 2012, and The Wave in 2014. In 2002, Bank of Beirut (UK) Ltd, a fully owned subsidiary, was established, which opened a branch in Frankfurt, Germany in 2009 (and closed in 2019).

Branded as Beirut Hellenic Bank, after buying Laiki Bank Australia from Cyprus Popular Bank in the 2011. Bank of Beirut Australia now trades under the name Bank of Sydney. Bank of Sydney operates branches NSW, Victoria and South Australia, with branches in Bankstown, Chatswood, Maroubra, Marrickville, Sydney CBD, Melbourne CBD (Vic), Oakleigh (Vic) and Mile End (South Australia).

== Offices and branches ==
Bank of Beirut currently operates a number of branches across 4 continents include branches in Lebanon, branches across Sydney, Melbourne, and Adelaide in Australia, branches in Oman, United Kingdom, and representative offices in Nigeria.

== See also ==
- Beirut Stock Exchange
- Economy of Lebanon
- List of Banks in Lebanon
- Banque du Liban
- Intercontinental Bank of Lebanon (IBL)
- Lebanon and Gulf Bank
- Saradar Bank
- Lebanon and Gulf Bank
