= Bank of Beirut and the Arab Countries =

Lebanese commercial bank established in 1956

Bank of Beirut and the Arab Countries s.a.l (Arabic: بنك بيروت والبلاد العربية, not to be confused with Bank of Beirut) is a Lebanese commercial bank that was established in 1956. With its headquarters in Clemenceau, Beirut, it is among the top ten banks in Lebanon, with a total capital of 157 billion LBP. It provides a wide range of services to individuals and corporations, including private banking, corporate and commercial banking, trade finance, retail banking, treasury and capital markets, and bank assurance.

These have 39 branches in Lebanon and 5 abroad in Cyprus, Iraq and representative offices in the UAE, and Nigeria.

== Background ==
In 1956, three businessmen Tawfiq Assaf, Nach'at Sheikh Al-Ard and Jamal Shhaibir, decided to establish the bank in Beirut, licensed by the Banque du Liban. Upon his death, Ghassan Assaf continued his father Tawfiq Assaf's mission as its current Chairman.

In 1986, the bank opened its first branch in Cyprus.

In 2001, the Bank of Beirut and the Arab Countries acquired 80% of the shares of Capital Insurance and Reinsurance, which allowed the bank to expand its services

In 2006, the bank’s capital was raised to 77 billion Lebanese pounds, with the issuance of preferential shares worth 50 million dollars. The process was repeated (80 million dollars) in 2012, raising his capital to 157 billion Lebanese pounds.

The bank ranks tenth in Lebanon for assets, totalling 12,247 billion Lebanese pounds in 2018 compared to 10,444 billion pounds in 2017, an increase of 17.26%.

In 2017, the bank's net profits reached 74 billion Lebanese pounds, with a liquidity rate of 79.77% and a capital efficiency of 14.75%, which is higher than the requirements of the local supervisory authorities and international standards. This allows the bank to face the future with confidence.

== Shareholders ==
Today, the shareholders of BBAC Bank are as follows: The Assaf family 54.45%, Fransabank 37.07%, and minority shareholders 8.48%.

== Key People ==
- Sheikh Ghassan Assaf, Chairman.

== See also ==
- List of Banks in Lebanon
- Banque du Liban
- Bank Audi
- Byblos Bank
- Fransabank
- Economy of Lebanon
