= Adnan Kassar =

Lebanese lawyer, businessman and politician (1930–2025)

Minister of State
- In office 9 November 2009 – June 2011
- Prime Minister: Saad Hariri

Minister of Economy and Trade
- In office 2004–2005
- Prime Minister: Omar Karami
- Preceded by: Marwan Hamadeh
- Succeeded by: Demianos Khattar

Personal details
- Born: 1930 Beirut, Lebanon
- Died: 2 May 2025 (aged 94)
- Party: Independent
- Spouse: Raedaa Miskaoui
- Children: 1
- Education: St. Joseph University

Adnan Kassar (Arabic: عدنان القصار; 1930 – 2 May 2025) was a Lebanese banker, businessman and politician, who served in different cabinet posts.

== Early life and education ==
Kassar was born into a Sunni Muslim family in Beirut in 1930. His father, Wafiq Kassar, was a prominent diplomat who served as the ambassador of Lebanon to Pakistan and Turkey. His mother was Chafika Diab.

In 1951, Kassar received a law degree from St. Joseph University in Beirut.

== Career ==
At age 25, Kassar managed to build a business partnership with China in 1955. In addition to being a businessman, he was a banker dealing finance investments. He founded and owned various companies concerning trade, shipping and travel, and industry. He was one of the owners of the Banque Libano-Française together with Farid Raphael, his brother Nadim Kassar and Victor Kassir. Kassar acquired the bank in 1980.

Kassar served as the president of the Beirut Chamber of Commerce and Industry for nearly thirty years to which he was elected in January 1972. In June 1997, he became the president of the Federation of Chambers of Commerce, Industry and Agriculture in Lebanon. From 1999 to 2000, he headed the International Chamber of Commerce (ICC) based in Paris, being the first Arab to preside over it. On 1 January 2001, Richard D. McCormick, who served as his deputy at the ICC, succeeded Kassar as head of the ICC.

In January 2003, Kassar was appointed member of the patrons committee of the Anglo-Arab organisation. In addition, Kassar and his brother were shareholders of Fransabank, a large Lebanese commercial bank. As of 2013 Kassar was serving as the chairman of the bank. He was also chairman of the general union of Arab chambers of commerce, industry and agriculture and of Lebanon's economic committees.

In October 2004, Kassar was appointed minister of economy and trade to the cabinet led by Prime Minister Omar Karami, replacing Marwan Hamadeh as economy minister. His tenure lasted until 2005 when Karami resigned from office due to the pressures exerted by Lebanese people as a protest over the assassination of Rafik Hariri. Kassar was succeeded by Demianos Khattah in the post. Later Kassar served as the minister of state in the cabinet led by Prime Minister Saad Hariri from November 2009 to 2011. Kassar was one of the cabinet members appointed by the Lebanese President Michel Suleiman.

Kassar was regarded as a potential prime minister since the beginning of the 2000s.

== Personal life and death ==
Kassar married Raedaa Miskaoui on 14 June 1969, and they had a daughter, Roula Kassar.

Kassar died on 2 May 2025, at the age of 94.

== Awards and honors ==
- Officier de la Legion d'honneur (France)
- Officer, National Order of the Cedar (Lebanon)
- Officer, National Order of Merit (France)
- Knight Commander, Order of Merit (Italy)
- Commander, Order of Rio Branco, (Brazil)

Kassar was also given other awards, including, Commander of the Order of La Pléiade, Hungarian Order of Merit, and the prize of the Crans Montana Forum (2000). The Union of Arab Banks awarded him the title of the Banker of the Year for the period 2012–2013. He was the recipient of the Business for Peace Award (2014) and was named as the honorary chairman of the Silk Road Chamber of International Commerce in 2016.

In April 2015 the School of Business at the Lebanese American University was named after Adnan Kassar.
