= Creditbank =

Creditbank s.a.l
- Industry: Banking
- Founded: Lebanon, (1981)
- Headquarters: Freeway Center; Sin El Fil Blvd., Dekwaneh, Lebanon
- Subsidiaries: Credex SAL
- Website: www.creditbank.com

Creditbank S.A.L is a Lebanese bank established in 1981 as Crédit Bancaire by Joseph Khalifé and Isaac Wimett. The acquisition of Crédit Lyonnais s.a.l in 2002 prompted the bank to change its name to Creditbank s.a.l.

Recording an average annual growth rate of some 20% for 7 years, the bank’s total deposits in 2013 surpassed the $2 billion benchmark for which it was awarded Lebanon’s prestigious Alpha Bank status. Creditbank s.a.l in 2013 also boasted Lebanon’s highest loans-to-deposits ratio at nearly 57%, while total assets by the end of the same year amounted to $2.6 billion.

With a shareholders’ equity of $412.5 million (as at 31/12/2018). Creditbank's network consists of 26 branches spread across Lebanon.

Creditbank offers products and services in the field of retail, investment, corporate, and SME banking. Some of the banking products it offers include the Creditbank Contactless Sticker, the Multi Currency Prepaid Card, the Combo Card. and Creditbank Pay App

== See also ==
- Banque Libano-Française
- Cedrus Bank
- Crédit Libanais
- List of Lebanese banks
