= Jammal Trust Bank =

Lebanese Bank

- Company type: Private company
- Industry: Financial services
- Predecessor: Invest Bank
- Founded: 1963
- Defunct: 2019
- Fate: Liquidated after US sanctions
- Headquarters: Beirut, Lebanon
- Key people: Anwar Jammal
- Owner: Jammal Family

Jamal Trust Bank (JTB, Arabic: جمّال ترست بنك) was a Lebanese bank founded in 1963, which was forced to close under US sanctions in 2019 for "helping to fund" the Lebanese Shiite Hezbollah movement in Lebanon. JBL had 25 branches in Lebanon, and representative offices in Nigeria, the Ivory Coast and Britain.

== History ==
It was founded in 1963 as Invest Bank. In 1971, it was bought by Ali Jammal and was renamed from to Jammal Investment Bank and finally JTB. The Jammal family are major shareholders, and Anwar Jammal, Ali's son, is its chairman and CEO.

=== US sanctions 2019 ===
In 2019, Riad Salameh, Governor of the Central Bank, said that he has approved the JTB self-liquidation request, which came after the sanctions in August of the same year, by the Office of Foreign Assets Control (OFAC) of the U.S. Department of the Treasury, which stated that the bank had "facilitated banking activities for Hezbollah".

== See also ==
- List of Lebanese banks
- Lebanese Canadian Bank
- Banque Libano-Francaise
- Byblos Bank
- Banque du Liban
