= Salim Sfeir =

Lebanese – Swiss banker and financier

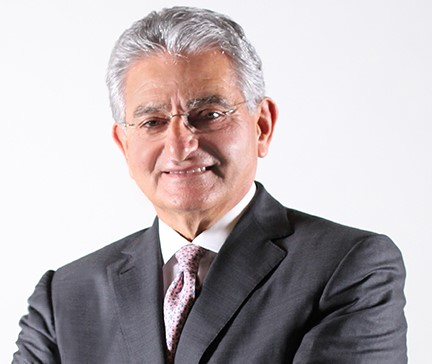
- Education: Université de Montréal; University of Detroit
- Occupations: Banker, financier
- Father: Georges Salim Sfeir
- Relatives: Archbishop Pietro Sfair (great uncle) Cardinal Nasrallah Boutros Sfeir (cousin)

Salim Georges Sfeir is a Lebanese – Swiss banker and financier. He is the chairman and Chief Executive of Bank of Beirut S.A.L in Beirut, Lebanon since 1993 and the chairman of Association of Banks in Lebanon since June 29, 2019.

== Early life and education ==
Salim Sfeir was raised in Beirut. He received his B.S.S. degree in economics from the Université de Montréal and his Masters of Business Administration from the University of Detroit Mercy. As an educator, Sfeir lectured at Lebanese University, Beirut University College, Haigazian College, l’Université Saint-Joseph and Le Centre d’études bancaires.

In the years to follow, he was appointed trustee on the board of directors of the Lebanese American University (LAU), Beirut and Byblos; vice-chairman of the board of trustees of the University of the Holy Spirit (USEK); member of the board of trustees AMIDEAST; and vice-chairman of the American Friends of the Middle East, Beirut.

Sfeir has been associated with the newly commissioned Salim Sfeir Building at the School of Business Administration at USEK, the Holy Spirit University of Kaslik, being awarded an honorary degree at USEK.

== Career ==
Sfeir began his career in finance with the Bank of Nova Scotia. (Years later he would acquire the Bank of Nova Scotia branch in London.) By 1980, he had joined Bankmed in Beirut as Deputy General Manager. Three years later, he formed Wedge Bank (Middle East) as General Manager, and in 1987 launched Wedge Bank Switzerland as Chief Executive and vice chairman.

In 1992, a group of businessmen headed by Sfeir purchased Bank of Beirut. Sfeir would later become the Chairman-General Manager. Following the purchase, the bank expanded from five branches within Lebanon to nine countries on four continents.

In 2014, alongside Bechara Boutros Al Rahi, the patriarch of the Maronite Church, Sfeir founded the World Maronite Foundation for Integral Development, a philanthropic organisation that aims to promote development in Lebanon.

In 2019, Sfeir was unanimously elected as chairman of the Association of Banks in Lebanon (ABL). He was reelected for three additional mandates in 2021, 2023 and 2025.

Sfeir was the subject of protests in 2023, when the Lebanese pound crashed amid the Lebanese liquidity crisis. Protestors tried to gain access to his home, as they accused banks of obstructing economic reforms.

== Honours and awards ==
Sfeir has been recognized through many honors internationally, including:

- Inauguration of the Library of the Pontifical Maronite College in Rome
- Medal of Saint Maroun by Mar Bechara Boutros El Rai, Patriarch of Antioch
- Honorary Doctorate in Humane Letters Honoris Causa, Lebanese American University
- Knight Commander of the Pontifical Order of Pope Saint Sylvester
- Medal of the National Order of the Cedar conferred by President Michel Suleiman
- Medal of the Maronite Patriarchate, Maronite Patriarch of Antioch

== See also ==
- Marwan Kheireddine
- Antoun Sehnaoui
