= Victor Kassir =

Lebanese businessman and politician (1910–1997)

Deputy Prime Minister
- In office April 1984 – September 1988
- Prime Minister: Rashid Karami; Selim Hoss

Minister of Industry and Economy
- In office April 1984 – September 1988
- Prime Minister: Rashid Karami; Selim Hoss

Personal details
- Born: 1910 Beirut, Ottoman Empire
- Died: 13 October 1997 (aged 86–87)
- Spouse: Bert Merhej
- Education: Saint Joseph University
- Occupation: Businessman

Victor Kassir (Arabic: فكتور قصير; 1910–1997) was a Lebanese businessman and politician who was the deputy prime minister and minister of industry and economy between 1984 and 1988. Before entering government, he was a prominent figure in Beirut's merchant community and a long-serving president of the Beirut Traders Association.

== Early life and education ==
Kassir was born in Beirut in 1910. He descended from a Greek Orthodox family. He received a bachelor's degree in commercial sciences in 1930 from Saint Joseph University in Beirut.

== Career ==
Following his graduation Kassir began to involve in business. In 1958 he was elected as a member of the Orthodox Finance Council. He headed the merchants association from 1972 to 1994. He was a member of the advisory committee of the Banque du Liban, a member of the Beirut Club, and a board member of the Banque Libano-Francaise. In fact, Kassir was one of the owners of the latter together with Farid Raphael and the Kassar brothers, Adnan and Nadim.

Kassir was the deputy prime minister and the minister of economy and industry in the cabinet led by Prime Minister Rashid Karami in the period 29 April 1984 – 22 September 1988.

== Personal life and death ==
Kassir was married to Bert Merhej, and they had four children. He died on 13 October 1997.

=== Awards ===
Kassir was the recipient of the following:

- National Order of the Cedar (rank of officer)
- Order of Merit (rank of commander)
- Order of Saint Peter the Great
