= AM Bank =

Lebanese Bank

- Company type: Private Joint Stock Company
- Industry: Banking
- Founded: 1980
- Headquarters: Beirut
- Area served: Lebanon
- Website: www.ambank.com

AM Bank (or Al-Mawarid Bank, Arabic: بنك الموارد) is a Lebanese medium-size bank that was established in 1980, by Salim Khaireddine, Maroun Kissirwani, and Omar Jundi. The bank provides basic banking services, card processing, investment banking and insurance brokerage.

The bank was the first in the country to introduce credit cards in 1995 and to mobile banking in 2010.

It is registered under Banque du Liban list at #101.

== Board of directors ==
- Marwan Kheireddine (Chairman, General Manager)
- Ibrahim Hanna Daher
- Majid Jumblat
- Omar Jundi
- Edmond Jreissati
- Ibrahim Houssamy
- Mahmoud Zeidan
- Wassim Khaireddine

== Products and services ==
The bank provides commercial banking products and services, including current and saving account options with credit, debit and prepaid cards available. It offers personal loans, car loans, educational loans and housing loans. It also offers insurance and investment plans. Other services include online and mobile banking, bills domiciliation, delivery service and loyalty card programs.

== Location and branches ==
The branch network covers major Lebanese provinces, with headquarters in Beirut.

Full-service branches are found in: Hamra, Aley, Baakline, Mar Elias, Manassef, Shtaura, Sheheem, Maten, Tripoli, Dora, Hasbaya, Dahieh, Cola, Jounieh, Saifi, Verdun and Achrafieh.

== New identity ==
The bank launched its new corporate identity in October 2012.

== International correspondents ==
caption
Country	Correspondent
USA	Bank of New York Mellon
France	BLC Bank (France) SA
France	Audi Bank (France) SA
England	British Arab Commercial Bank
Tokyo	Bank of New York
Germany	CommerzBank AG
Geneva	BLOM Bank Switzerland
Belgium	Byblos Bank-Belgium SA
Italy	Intesa BCI S.p.A.
Australia	Commonwealth Bank of Australia thru Lebanese Swiss Bank –Beirut -
Canada	Bank of Montreal thru Lebanese Swiss Bank –Beirut -
Dubai	Mashreqbank P

== See also ==
- Lebanese Canadian Bank
- Byblos Bank
- Jammal Trust Bank
- Economy of lebanon
- Beirut Stock Exchange
