= Saradar Bank =

- Industry: Banking
- Founded: 1948
- Headquarters: Lebanon

Saradar Bank (Arabic: بنك موقع) is a Lebanese bank, licensed by the Banque du Liban, previously known as Audi-Saradar Bank during the merging with Bank Audi from 2004 till 2016. There is very little information known about Saradar Bank before 2004, but it was known that it was established in 1948 by the businessman Marius Saradar, and was entirely owned by the family, most likely for the purpose of managing the family's money.

== History ==
On February 1, 1948, the bank was established by Marius Saradar, and was entirely owned by the family, most likely for the purpose of managing the family's money.

In 2002, the Banque Libano-Française initiated a failed negotiated with the management of Saradar Bank to purchase its shares.

On March 29, 2004, Bank Audi and Bank Saradar signed an agreement to merge the two banks in a deal valued at that time $159 million, thus the new group became known as Bank Audi Saradar.

In May 2016, Saradar Bank was reborn, after Mario Saradar's exit from Bank Audi. The shareholder base of Saradar Bank expanded to include: Carlos Ghosn, Maktat Group, Mikati Group, Saradar Group, Shammas Group, Al Bustani Family, Al Khazen Family and the Swiss Wiederkehr Group.

== See also ==
- List of banks in Lebanon
- Byblos Bank
- Fransabank
- Economy of Lebanon
