= Bankmed =

Lebanese bank

- Company type: Public
- Industry: Banking
- Founded: Beirut, Lebanon
- Headquarters: Beirut, Lebanon
- Area served: Lebanon; France; Cyprus; Switzerland; United Arab Emirates

Bankmed SAL (Arabic: بنك البحر المتوسط ش.م.ل; formerly Banque de la Méditerranée S.A.L) is a Lebanese bank, established in 1944, owned by the holding company GroupMed. It is one of Lebanon’s top five banks by both assets and deposits, and has 36 branches in Lebanon, and one in Geneva (called Bankmed Suisse). Bankmed is owned by the family of Rafic Hariri, the former prime minister and billionaire businessman who was assassinated in 2005. The bank is also the largest shareholder in Solidere, the real estate company that rebuilt Beirut's Central District after the Lebanese Civil War.

In 2020, former minister Raya El Hasan was appointed as chairperson of the board after the resignation of Mohammad Hariri.

Bankmed’s total assets by 2018 were $19 billion.

== Background ==
Egypt-based Jordanian businessman Alaa Al Khawaja acquired the 42.24 percent stake of Ayman Hariri in GroupMed Holding which fully owns Bankmed. The other shareholders in GroupMed are Saad Hariri (42.24%) and Nazek Hariri (the remaining 15.5 percent).

== Key people ==
- Raya El Hasan, Chairperson of the Board
- Michel Accad, Executive General Manager
- Nazik Hariri, Board Member

== See also ==
- List of Banks in Lebanon
- Banque du Liban
- Bank Audi
- Byblos Bank
- Fransabank
- Economy of Lebanon
