= First National Bank (Lebanon) =

Lebanese bank

- Industry: Financial services
- Founded: 1991; 35 years ago
- Headquarters: Beirut Central District, Allenby Street, Bldg. Marfaa 147 Beirut, Lebanon
- Products: Loans, checking, savings, investments, debit cards
- Website: www.fnb.com.lb

First National Bank (Arabic: فرست ناشونال بنك) is a Lebanese financial bank, established in the year 1991 under the name (Bank of Commerce SAL).

The bank continued to carry out limited banking activities until the year 1994, when a group of Gulf businessmen acquired the bank's shares, including Mr. Mohammed Al-Sager.

In the year 2000, Lebanon Invest SAL acquired 62% of the bank's shares, and in 2002 the aforementioned bank merged with the Societe Bancaire du Liban (SBL) and the name was changed to First National Bank.

The bank includes 24 branches in Lebanon.

== Key people ==
- Rami Nemer, chairman (2009)

== See also ==
- List of Banks in Lebanon
- Byblos Bank
- Audi Bank
- Banque du Liban
- Economy of Lebanon
