= Kassir =

Surname

Kassir is a surname. Notable people with the surname include:

- Amal Kassir (born 1995), spoken word poet
- John Kassir (born 1957), American actor and comedian
- Oussama Kassir (born 1966), Lebanese-born Swedish militant Islamist and criminal
- Samir Kassir (1960–2005), Lebanese-Palestinian-French professor of history
- Victor Kassir (1910–1997), Lebanese businessman and politician
- Zarina Kassir, a character in the 2016 multiplayer horror game Dead by Daylight
