= Intercontinental Bank of Lebanon =

IBL Bank
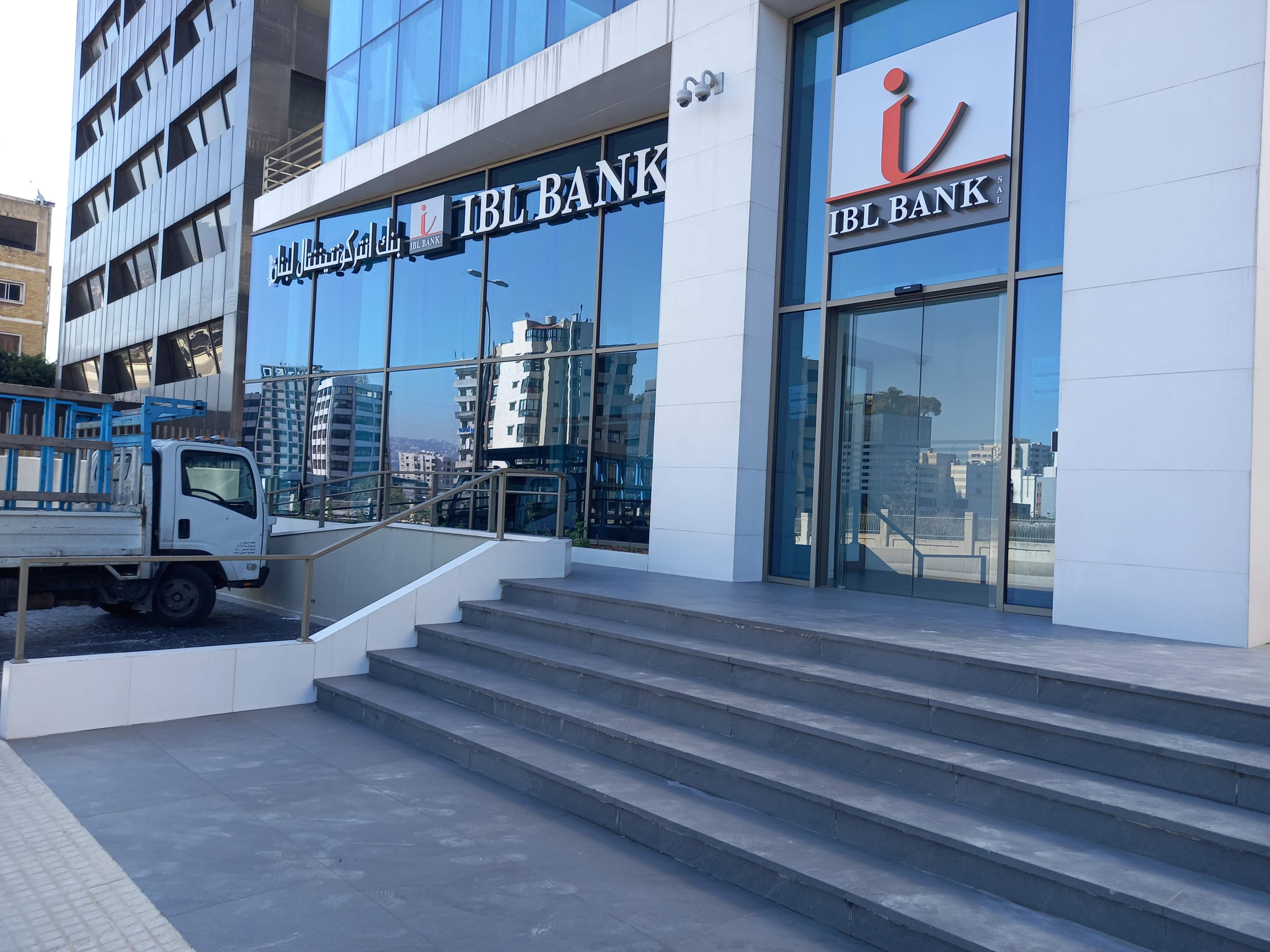
- Sin el Fil branch
- Native name: انتركونتيننتال لبنان
- Formerly: Intercontinental Bank of Lebanon, Development Bank SAL
- Company type: Private company
- Industry: Financial services
- Founded: 1961; 65 years ago
- Headquarters: Beirut, Lebanon
- Number of locations: 20 branches
- Key people: Salim Habib (Chairman and General Manager)
- Products: Banking services
- Website: www.ibl.com.lb

Intercontinental Bank of Lebanon (IBL Bank, Arabic: انتركونتيننتال لبنان) is a Lebanese Bank with headquarters and main branch located in Achrafieh, Beirut, Lebanon.

As of 2021, the bank had 20 branches in Lebanon, in addition to foreign branches in Cyprus, Erbil, Baghdad, and Basra.

== History ==
The bank was established in 1961 as Development Bank SAL (بنك الإنماء).

In September 1998, the majority of the bank's shares were bought by a group of Lebanese and foreign investors.

A year later, in September 1999, the bank acquired the entire shares of BCP Bank Group, and since that date it has operated under the name Intercontinental Bank of Lebanon (IBL).

== Key people ==
- Salim Habib, chairman and General Manager (formerly a member of parliament)
- Kamal Abi Ghosn, Executive Member of the Board
- Dr. Elie A. Assaf, Independent Member of the Board
- Me. Michel J. Tuéni, Executive Member of the Board

== See also ==
- List of Banks in Lebanon
- Banque du Liban
- Bank Audi
- Byblos Bank
- Fransabank
- Economy of Lebanon
