= Société Générale de Banque au Liban =

Lebanese bank

Societe Generale de Banque au Liban S.A.L. (SGBL), (Arabic: بنك سوسيتيه جنرال في لبنان, founded in 1953), is a Lebanese bank, and a subsidiary of SGBL Group, and offers banking services in the Middle East (Lebanon, Jordan), the Gulf (United Arab Emirates) and Europe (Cyprus, France and Monaco).

Antoun Sehnaoui is the company's chairman, chief executive officer and main shareholder. The other main shareholders are Kafinvest Holding Lebanon Company SAL, Société Générale (France) and NSKINV Ltd.

SGBL offers a range of banking services to individuals and companies.

== Société Générale (France) holding ==
In 2020, local reports verified that Société Générale (France) did not divest from its holding in SGBL after an allegation that SGBL is a "troubled and mismanaged bank." Société Générale (France) had set aside provisions to compensate for the downgrade in Lebanon's credit rating for the previous fiscal year because the downgrade caused a decrease in the value of its holding in SGBL.

== Corporate social responsibility and sustainable development ==
Corporate social responsibility and sustainable development have been an integral part of SGBL’s identity and they are based on four pillars: sports, culture, society and economic growth.

== See also ==
- List of Banks in Lebanon
- Banque du Liban
- Bank Audi
- Crédit Libanais
- Fransabank
- Economy of Lebanon
