= Rana Abdel-Rahim Koleilat =

Banker accused of being at the head of Lenanon's biggest banking scandal

Rana Abdel-Rahim Koleilat (Arabic: رنا عبد الرحيم قليلات, born January 23, 1967) is a Lebanese Sunni female banker who was accused of being at the head of the biggest banking scandal in the history of Lebanon. She fled Lebanon to Brazil in 2005, while she was being investigated for the mysterious collapse of Al-Madina Bank, which she allegedly stole $3 billion, but her whereabouts today are unknown.

== Biography ==
She born on January 23, 1967 in the Ras-El-Nabeh neighborhood in the heart of Beirut.

She joined Al-Madina Bank as a clerk in 1985, before becoming an executive of Ibrahim Abou Ayyash, the brother of Chairman Adnan Abou Ayyash.

A few years later, Koleilat was promoted and became one of the bank's senior executives, whose specific responsibility was to liaise with the Central Bank of Lebanon. However, her executive power in the bank seemed much broader than that, and according to Omar Nashabe's article in Al-Raida newspaper, the reason he was granted such power, sufficient to control the activities of the entire bank, without supervision, is still unclear.

== Al-Madina bank Scandal ==
=== Al-Madina bank collapse ===
Rana Koleilat has been accused of leading the biggest Lebanese banking scandal in history, involving the waste of more than $1.2 billion.

Apparently having started as early as November 1999, Koleilat is alleged to have carried out a series of forgeries aimed at transferring funds to fake accounts controlled by herself and her associates within the bank. During the period of December 2002 til February 2003, she would have made more than 400 cheques issued in her name and in the names of her accomplices, drawn on her account for a total amount of approximately $150 million. This resulted in a liquidity crisis and caused the bank to collapse.

The bankruptcy of the bank seems a chapter of the conspiracy Rana orchestrated it to cause its liquidation to remove all clues related to its theft and money laundering crimes. Adnan Abu Ayyash then jeopardized all its remaining resources to pull the bank's crisis and avoid its collapse. This was the only option, necessary to guarantee the repayment of the depositors' money.

Up to March 2003, Ayyash personally paid $470 million to the Central Bank of Lebanon and sold a large part of his real-estate assets (land, buildings, etc.) to the Central Bank avoid the bank's collapse, which was not enough to stem the collapse of Bank.

The Lebanese authorities indicted Koleilat and nine others responsible for one of the biggest banking scandals in the history of Lebanon .

A lawsuit brought by Dr Ayyash in Manhattan Federal Court alleges that Koleilat would have laundered money for Saddam Hussein and helped finance the organization of "Al-Shaheed", a front organization for Hezbollah, with approximately $3.5 million.

=== First arrest ===
Rana was arrested at the end of 2003, then released on bail in December 2004, which made the front pages of Beirut newspapers, but then fled Lebanon in 2005, shortly after being released.

=== Assassination of Rafic Hariri ===
Rana Koleilat is accused of using funds stolen during the Al-Madina fraud to finance the assassination of Rafic Hariri. Fortune international magazine developed a thesis according to which the former Prime Minister Hariri would have been assassinated because of his will to open the file of the bank Al-Madina once back in power. The journal claims to have bank documents confirming their thesis. Many Lebanese believe that Syria and its allies in Lebanon may have played a role in the assassination of the Primer Minister, who had tried to reduce the influence of Syria and 20 other people.

=== Second arrest ===
Koleilat, aged 39, was arrested in 2006 in São Paulo, after an anonymous denunciation. She offered a bribe of $94,000 to the Brazilian police. Her lawyer claims that it was a misunderstanding caused by Portuguese language, poorly controlled by Koleilat.

When arrested, she was carrying a British passport, identifying her as Rana Klailat. Police said they had visited Brazil three times in the past year. The British Embassy in Beirut was unable to validate her passport. The lawyer for Koleilat assured that the document was a genuine, because it has obtained dual nationality - Lebanese and British.

Rana Koleilat was then allegedly interrogated for approximately five hours at the São Paulo Federal Police Headquarters. She risks being extradited to Lebanon. Her fleet of 380 cars and 33 luxury yachts of Ayash Abou and Koleilat was confiscated.

At the same time, the São Paulo judge is said to have rejected requests for bail made by Rana's defenders in connection with the São Paulo police corruption charge.

The Central Bank, which works to protect depositors' money, has reportedly accepted the postponement of the interrogation, after Rana Koleilat agreed to pay a sum of $5 million every two weeks to cover part of the debts of the bank.
