= Wassim Mansouri =

Acting Governor of Banque du Liban

Wassim A. Manssouri
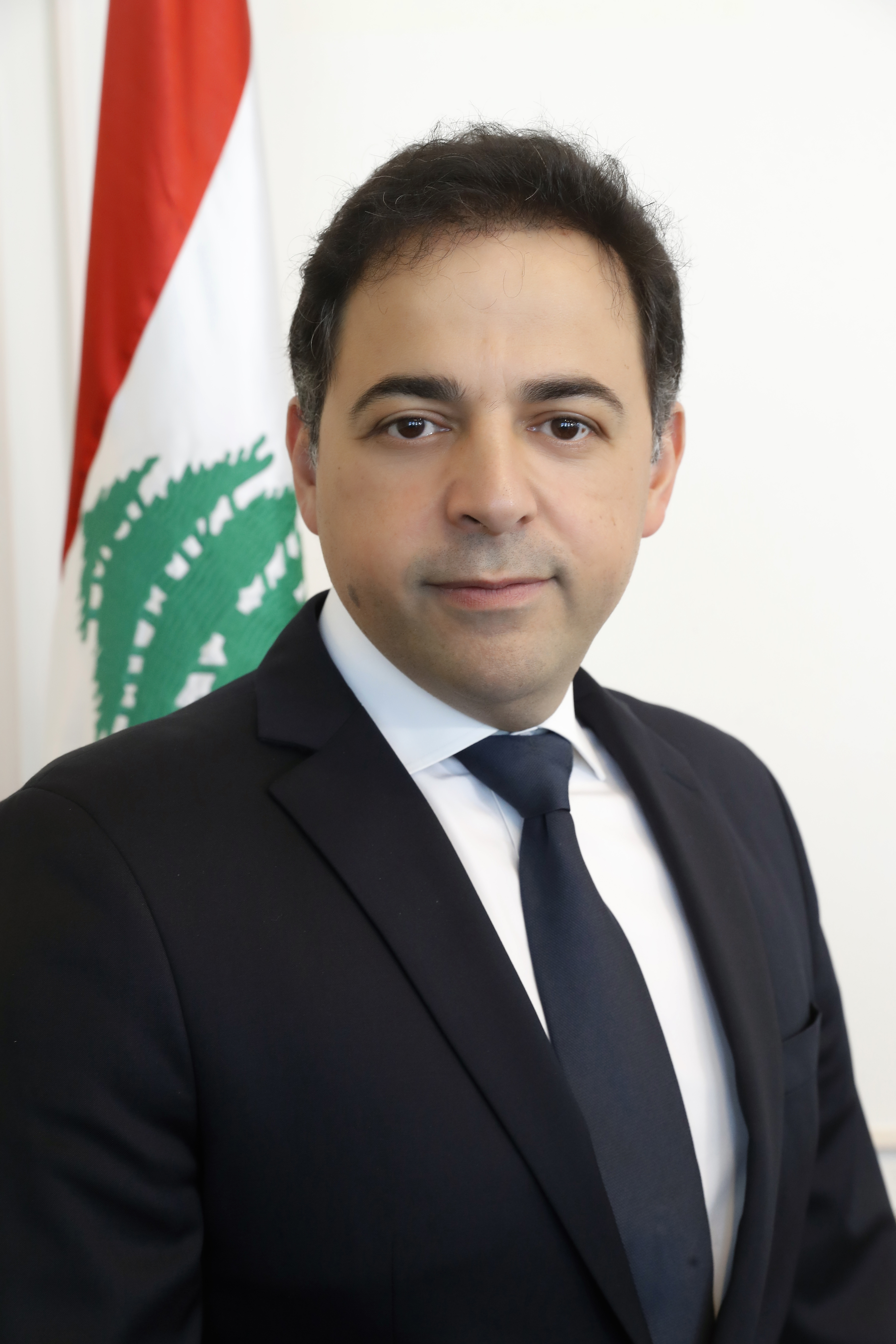
- Manssouri in 2020

Acting Governor of Banque du Liban
- In office July 31, 2023 – March 27, 2025
- President: Joseph Aoun
- Preceded by: Riad Salamé
- Succeeded by: Karim A. Souaid

Personal details
- Born: Wassim Manssouri; November 21, 1971 (age 54)
- Education: Montpellier University; Lebanese University

Wassim Manssouri (also spelled Mansouri) (Arabic: وسيم منصوري; born November 21, 1971) is a Lebanese lawyer who was the Acting Governor of the Banque du Liban from 2023 to 2025. He was appointed as First Vice-Governor by Decree No. 6475 on June 10, 2020. He assumed the role of Acting Governor under Article 25 of the Code of Money and Credit on August 1, 2023. On July 11, 2025, Dr. Manssouri was re-elected to a new five-year term as First Vice-Governor of the Central Bank of Lebanon, extending his tenure through July 11, 2030.

In his role as Acting Governor, he was supported by the three Vice-Governors and the Central Council. He chaired the BDL Central Council, the Higher Banking Commission, the Special Investigation Commission (SIC), and the Capital Markets Authority (CMA).

Manssouri serves as a member of the Board of Governors at both the International Monetary Fund (IMF), and the Arab Monetary Fund (AMF).

== Career ==
Wassim Manssouri is an attorney and the founder of Manssouri & Associates Law Firm (1998–2020).

Manssouri has been a member of the National Committee of the Permanent Court of Arbitration, The Hague (2012–2018), a legal consultant of the Minister of Finance, representing the Minister in the annual and spring meetings of the International Monetary Fund (IMF) and the World Bank Group as well as in the Organization for Economic Co-operation and Development (OECD) meetings (2014–2020), a consultant of the Human Rights Commission at the Lebanese Parliament (2013–2020) and a Board member of the Tripoli Special Economic Zone (April 2015, 2020).

== Education ==
Manssouri holds a PhD in Public Law from Montpellier University – France and another PhD "Doctorat d'état" from the Lebanese University.

He is a professor in the French section of the faculty of law at the Lebanese University, where he served as the director of the section (2019–2020).

== Civil society ==
In 2009, Manssouri founded the Lebanese Association of Constitutionalists, which he presided over (2009–2020). The association aims to promote knowledge and awareness in constitutional law, human rights, and democracy.

Manssouri has authored articles and studies in the fields of law, constitution, legislation, political science, and economics. Notably, he conducted a study on Lebanon's Accession to the Global Forum on Transparency and Exchange of Information for Tax Purposes, Belgium, 2018.

== Central Bank ==
In August 2023, Manssouri took over as the interim head of Lebanon's central bank, replacing Riad Salameh. Salameh has been accused of corruption, money laundering and running the largest Ponzi scheme in history; he was additionally labeled "the world’s worst central banker". He is currently under sanctions by Canada, the United Kingdom and the United States.

Manssouri has discussed policy shifts, such as phasing out the "Sayrafa exchange platform" and stopping government funding from the central bank without legal backing. Dr. Manssouri emphasizes the need for government reforms and legislative solutions to address the financial crisis and has called for rebuilding trust with depositors to revive the banking sector. He advocates for a collective solution to return frozen bank assets to depositors.

Manssouri has expressed a commitment to reforming governance and accounting processes at the Central Bank while ensuring that the institution fulfills its genuine role of maintaining monetary stability.

Internationally, Manssouri has been noted for his stance on halting government funding and advocating for monetary stability. He has highlighted the necessity of clear and robust laws to address the banking sector's challenges and has been involved in meetings with international bodies like the IMF and regional stakeholders to discuss Lebanon's economic situation.

Manssouri has been actively working to prevent Lebanon from being added to the Financial Action Task Force (FATF) "grey list". This list includes countries under increased monitoring for deficiencies in combating money laundering and terrorist financing.

FATF listed Lebanon on the list of countries that have not adequately cooperated in the AML and TF in the Fall meetings that took place in Paris on 21-25 Oct. Early international warnings in this regards made Acting Governor initiate to make direct calls with the centers of international financial decision makers to mitigate the automatic implications of such listing. He made acclaimed success in insulating the financial sector by affirming his commitment to the stringent criteria for anti-money laundering.

FATF decision was preceded by wide movement on part of the central bank Acting Governor in the capitals of the international financial decision making, to insulate its effects from cross-border banking transactions, especially with the American corresponding banks, and subsequently, the European ones. The Acting Governor initiated a visit to Washington aiming to revive his direct communications with a group of the largest American corresponding banks that were participating in the semi-annual IMF and World Bank meetings. Then he moved to Paris to participate in FATF meetings as head of the Special Investigation Committee, the national committee charged with AML, and that is a founding member of FATF-MENA, headquartered in Manama, Bahrain.

As acting governor, Manssouri is also credited with restoring the regularity of relations with abroad, and succeeded in all his Parisian, London, American, Gulf and Arab meetings in restoring the Central Bank of Lebanese to the circle of international communication and attention, which is a fundamental issue whose advantages cannot be overlooked. After the internal reforms undertaken by the Central Bank, the Central Bank voluntarily asked the IMF to undergo the so-called safeguard assessment, which is a diagnostic review of the governance and oversight framework of central banks (which assesses 6 key areas referred to as GELRIC to help protect IMF disbursements and reduce the risk of inaccurate reporting of key data to the IMF). BDL requested to enter this program voluntarily, and the IMF is able to monitor the work of the CBL's directorates (the IMF has not published its reports and will not publish them until Lebanon signs a program with the IMF).

Manssouri succeeded in postponing Lebanon's inclusion on the “gray list” twice, which served as a timeout during which he focused on correcting the dysfunction at the Central Bank of Lebanon, and benefited from the postponement period, unlike other institutions, as the Central Bank and the banking sector implemented the FATF requirements, especially in addressing the cash economy issue, and as a result, the Central Bank and banks were neutralized from the G20 report, and were even praised for their achievements in compliance. Usually, the inclusion of countries on this list affects central banks and the banking sector... Except in the case of Lebanon, which is a precedent, as the FATF exempted the Central Bank and banks from the ten items it issued in its report for the first time in its history, and exempted the Central Bank and banks from any action for two years. In addition, the issue of the monetary economy was not an item among those ten items, considering that the Central Bank has done its duty, recognizing that the monetary stability mechanisms established by the Central Bank of Lebanon are acceptable to it and other international monetary and financial organizations.

When Acting BDL Governor Wassim Manssouri implemented the plan to sell the Lebanese pound in exchange for dollars, he subjected its processes to control and transparency, so he was able to increase the foreign currency reserves, which, since Manssouri took charge until last September, amounted to two billion dollars, which stabilized monetary stability during the days of the war. With these reserves, BDL paid about 400 million dollars of the mentioned amount to depositors through increasing the number of circular payments, in addition to employees' salaries.

To his credit, Manssouri also accomplished the institutionalization of the Central Bank in 2024 in accordance with international standards as well. World Bank and IMF delegates recount how they can now deal transparently with the Central Bank of Lebanon, in line with international standards, which is also felt by the government and its ministries, whose accounts and budgets are now detailed and clear in terms of cash income and expenses. And for the first time in decades, the government achieved a surplus of $600 million, after the deficit used to reach several billion dollars annually, as a result of the cooperation between the Ministry of Finance and BDL.

The relationship between the BDL and the banks has been regularized and is subject to one standard, with no exceptions or discrimination. The year 2024 saw the establishment of a single exchange rate under Circular 167, on the basis of which banks' budgets were conducted, the valuation of their real estate, overcoming the issues facing auditors, and regulating the sector in line with international standards, in full readiness to implement the restructuring law when it is approved.

In October 2024 and despite the intensive Israeli assaults on Lebanon, the Lebanese Eurobond market continued to witness remarkable demand from foreign players in the international financial markets. A banking source attributed this partly to the immunity that the new monetary policies adopted by central bank leadership led by Acting Governor Wassim Manssouri, that had encouraging feedback from decision makers in the foreign markets to keep communication channels with the Lebanese financial sector and its private and public bonds. These policies, according to the same source, have succeeded in a firm management of liquidity, protecting the monetary stability, insulting it from the pressures of the war, and strengthening the foreign currencies reserves, despite the sharp decline in tourism sector inflows.

=== New circulars ===
Manssouri issued a series of circulars related to anti-money laundering and counter-terrorism financing standards, such as Intermediate Circular No. 692, which establishes at least two departments within the verification unit to supervise both the bank's head office and its branches, and to ensure that all AML/CFT and anti-corruption standards are applied. Moreover, Manssouri canceled all circulars that required depositors to withdraw their dollar deposits in Lebanese pounds, which caused their money to melt, so withdrawals became in US dollars in application of Basic Circulars 158 and 166 at the beginning of 2024.

BDL made exceptional amendments in circulars to increase payments to depositors (triple and then double the monthly value), kept salaries paid to employees in dollars, and eased pressure on the Lira. According to sources, the start of the new year will carry a permanent amendment for a relative increase in the monthly circular payment, noting that the beneficiaries of BDL circulars amounting to about 450,000 beneficiaries until this month, with payments reaching two billion and 600 million dollars until the end of this year.
