= Al-Madina Bank scandal =

Al-Madina Bank (Arabic: بنك المدينة) was a Lebanese bank that was seized by the Banque du Liban and closed completely in 2003 because of its mysterious case of suspicion in money laundering, corruption and fraud. The main figure in the scandal was Rana Koleilat, but also Adnan Abu Ayyash, the bank owner, and his brother Ibrahim. As many as 135 people may have been involved in the corruption case, included political, military, financial and legal figures.

The total amount of money lost from the bank was 1.65 billion US dollars.

== History ==
Bank Al-Madina began operating in 1982, with its headquarters in Hamra.

Adnan Abu Ayyash bought the bank in 1986, and was its main shareholder, along with his brother Ibrahim.

The bank expanded to 18 branches in Lebanon throughout the 90's.

=== Scandal ===
A report was filed accusing the bank of embezzling millions of dollars and writing bad checks, and 411 people were suspected of receiving suspicious funds from the bank.

In 2003, a committee was formed to investigate the bank's millions of dollars of fraud to investigate money laundering.

Rana Koleilat was accused of playing a key role in the fraud.

Reports have said that the amount missing money from Al-Madina and its subsidiary United Credit Bank (UCB) could total as much as euro 1.0 billion.

The bank collapsed in 2003.

Missing funds from the bank were linked to the assassination of the Rafik Hariri in 2005.

== Bank Managers ==
- Dr. Adnan Abu Ayyash - Honorary Chairman/General Manager
- Sheikh Ibrahim Abu Ayyash - Chairman/General Manager
- Mr. Michel El-Helou - Board Member
