= Edmond Naïm =

Lebanese politician, jurist and governor (1918–2006)

Edmond Naim
- إدمون نعيم
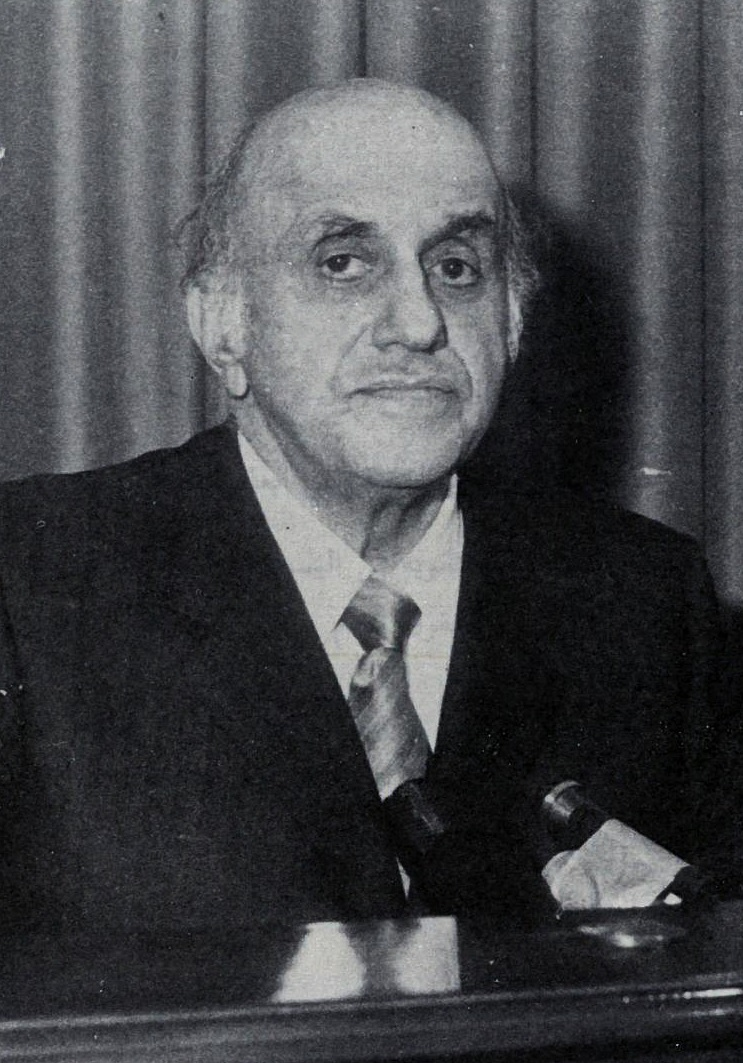

Governor of Banque du Liban
- In office 15 January 1983 – 16 January 1991
- Preceded by: Michel El Khoury
- Succeeded by: Michel El Khoury

Personal details
- Born: 1918
- Died: January 23, 2006 (aged 87–88)
- Party: Lebanese Forces
- Other political affiliations: Progressive Socialist Party (1951–1963)
- Parent: Wadih Naim (father)
- Occupation: Banker, lawyer, politician

Edmond Wadih Naim (Arabic: إدمون نعيم; 1918 – January 23, 2006) was a Lebanese politician, jurist and governor of the Banque du Liban.

== Biography ==
=== Early life and education ===
Edmond Naïm was born to a Maronite Catholic family in the town of Chiyah in the Greater Beirut region in the year 1918. He studied at the Jesuit Fathers' School, obtained a bachelor's degree in Law from the French Law School in Beirut in 1941 and received a PhD in law from Saint Joseph University in Beirut.

=== Career ===
Naim was a member of the Progressive Socialist Party between 1951 and 1963. He participated in the parliamentary elections in 1957 and 1960 but without success.

He held the position of Dean of the Faculty of Law of the Lebanese University in 1961 and was then President of the university in 1970 until 1976. In January 1985, he was elected Governor of Lebanon's central bank, Banque du Liban.

During the Lebanese civil war, he was hailed as a hero after he barricaded himself in his office while receiving constant death threats after refusing to lend corrupt government officials any money.

In 1994, Naim became the lawyer of Samir Geagea, head of the Lebanese Forces militia, as he was tried and accused of war crimes during the Lebanese Civil war.

In 2005, he was elected as deputy of the Lebanese parliament and was the eldest member of the 2005 legislative cycle as a representative of the Lebanese Forces.

== Death ==
Edmond Naïm died on January 23, 2006, at the age of 88 from an illness. Naim's seat was replaced by an independent politician, Pierre Daccache, in a by-election.
