= Michel El Khoury =

Lebanese politician (1926–2026)

- ميشال الخوري
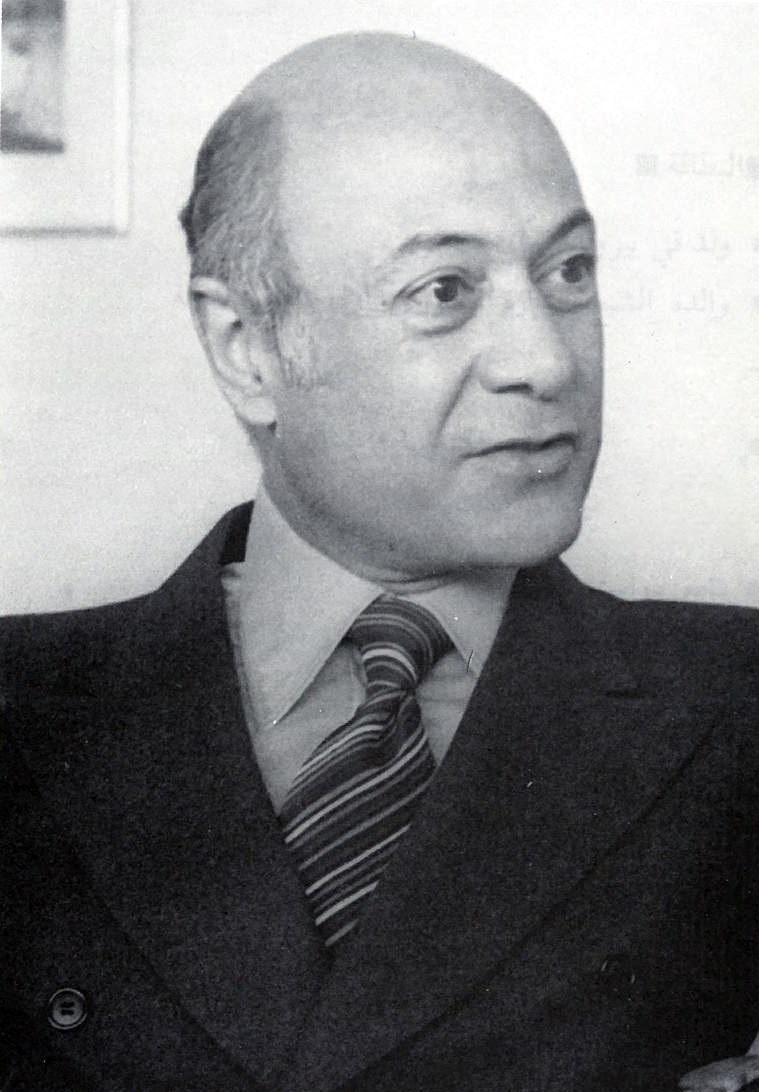

Governor of Banque du Liban
- In office 1978–1983
- Preceded by: Joseph Oughourlian
- Succeeded by: Edmond Naïm
- In office 1991–1993
- Preceded by: Edmond Naïm
- Succeeded by: Riad Salamé

Personal details
- Born: Michel Bechara El Khoury; 24 November 1926 Beirut, Lebanon
- Died: 4 July 2026 (aged 99)
- Parent: Bechara El Khoury (father)

Michel Bechara El Khoury (Arabic: ميشال بشارة الخوري; 24 November 1926 – 4 July 2026) was a Lebanese politician who served as governor of Banque du Liban from 1978 to 1983 and from 1991 to 1993. The son of President Bechara El Khoury, he succeeded him in leading the Constitutional Bloc. He was defense minister from December 1965 to April 1966. El Khoury died on 4 July 2026, at the age of 99.
