= Riad Salameh =

Lebanese economist (born 1950)

- رياض سلامة
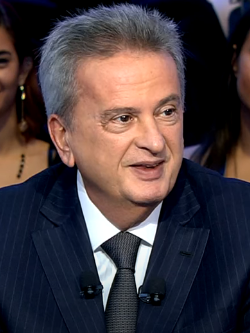

Governor of Banque du Liban
- In office 1 August 1993 – 31 July 2023
- President: Elias Hrawi; Émile Lahoud; Michel Sleiman; Michel Aoun
- Preceded by: Michel Khoury
- Succeeded by: Wassim Mansouri (acting); Karim A. Souaid

Personal details
- Born: 17 July 1950 (age 76) Antelias, Lebanon
- Children: 4
- Education: American University of Beirut

Riad Toufic Salameh (Arabic: رياض توفيق سلامة; born 17 July 1950) is a Lebanese economist. He previously was governor of Lebanon's central bank, Banque du Liban, from August 1993 until July 2023. He was appointed Governor by decree, approved by the Council of Ministers for a renewable term of six years. He was reappointed for four consecutive terms; in 1999, 2005, 2011 and 2017. Riad Salameh left his position on 31 July 2023 upon the end of his term, and due to the Lebanese parliament's failure in electing a new president and forming a new government capable of appointing a successor he was succeeded by his first deputy Wassim Mansouri in an acting capacity

Although credited for maintaining the stability of the Lebanese pound until 2019, Salameh has been accused of corruption, money laundering and running the largest Ponzi scheme in history; he was additionally labeled "the world’s worst central banker". He is currently under sanctions by Canada, the United Kingdom and the United States.

== Early life ==
Riad Salameh was born in Antelias in 1950 into a Christian Maronite family of successful business people, long based in Liberia. His father Toufic Salameh owned the Cedars Hotel in Broummana, and his mother Raniah was a "well-known charitable activist" and Lebanese Red Cross member who was murdered in 1982. He has three siblings.

Salameh grew up in his grandfather's house in Antelias, and attended the Jesuits' Collège Notre Dame de Jamhour, followed by a bachelor's degree in economics from the American University of Beirut.

== Career ==
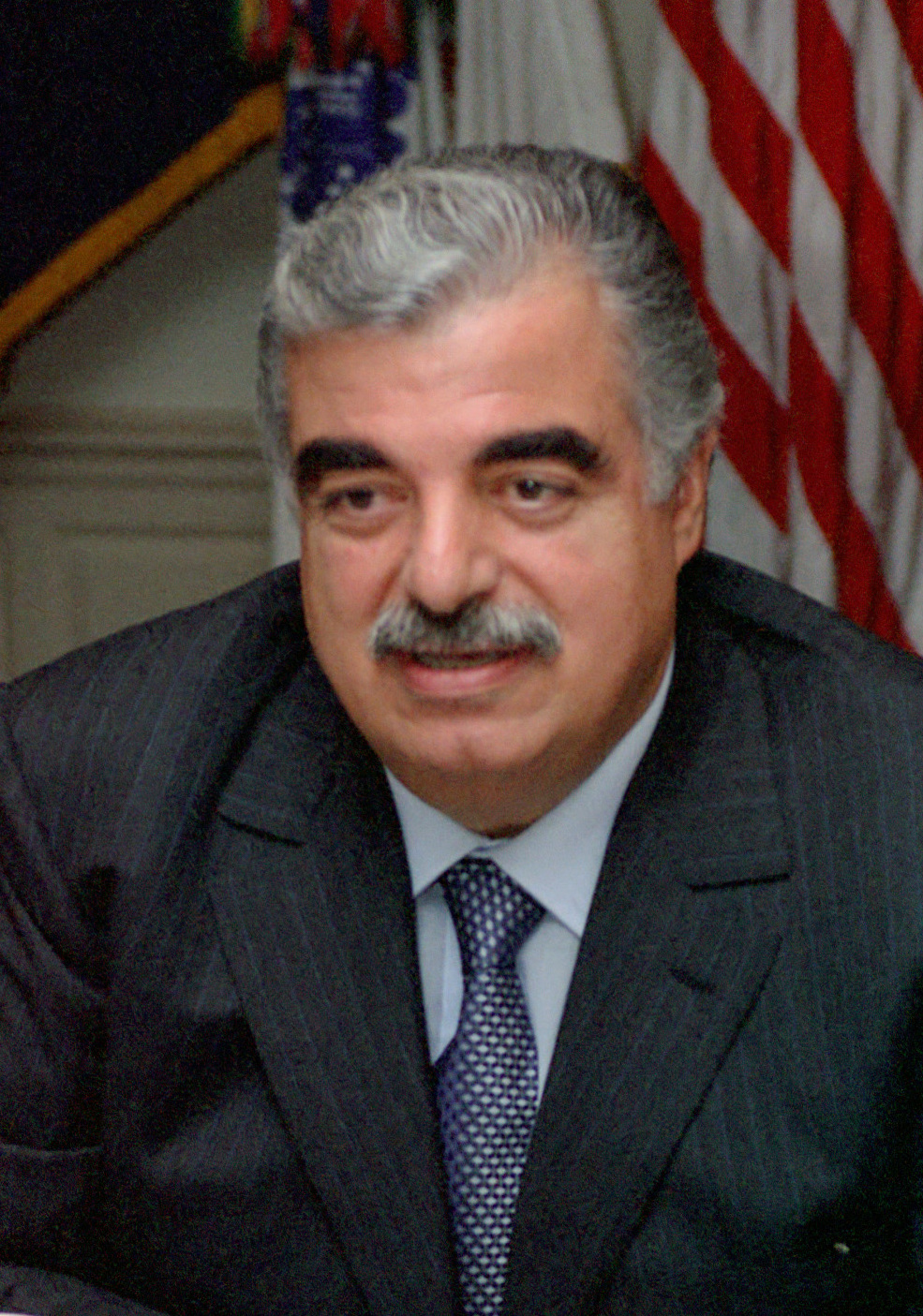
Rafic Hariri appointed Salameh as governor of BDL

=== Merrill Lynch ===
From 1973 to 1993, Salameh worked at Merrill Lynch in Beirut and Paris, as an executive manager, and then became a vice-president and financial advisor. He met with businessman Rafic Hariri, a huge investor in the company, and became his portfolio manager.

=== Lebanon's central bank ===
After the end of the civil war, Hariri became the prime minister and appointed Salameh as the governor of Lebanon's central bank. He took office on 1 August 1993, and was subsequently reappointed for four consecutive terms in 1999, 2005, 2011 and 2017. Salameh chairs the BDL Central Council, the Higher Banking Commission, the AML/CFT Special Investigation Commission and the Capital Markets Authority.

He is a member of the board of governors at the International Monetary Fund (IMF) and at the Arab Monetary Fund (AMF). In October 2012 he chaired the Boards of Governors of the IMF and the World Bank Group at their Annual Meetings in Tokyo, presiding over the plenary and delivering the opening address on 12 October 2012.

On 1 July 2013 Salameh began a two-year term, ending on 30 June 2015, as non-member co-chair of the Financial Stability Board (FSB) Regional Consultative Group for the Middle East and North Africa. He was chairman of the board of governors of the AMF in 2013.

=== Post-war stabilisation and banking reconstruction ===
Salameh took office in August 1993, three years after the end of the Lebanese Civil War, at a time of high inflation, a depreciated currency and a banking system weakened by fifteen years of conflict. Within four years, according to the French ambassador Daniel Jouanneau, he had equipped the central bank with modern structures, restored the banking sector's role in financing the country's development, created new financial instruments and rebuilt Beirut's position as a regional financial centre.

The pound, which had lost most of its value during the war, appreciated steadily from 1993 and was stabilised at about 1,507.5 to the United States dollar, a rate fixed from December 1997 that the central bank maintained, through successive political and security shocks, until the financial crisis of 2019. Inflation, which had peaked at nearly 100 per cent in 1992, fell to 0.2 per cent in 1999. Over the same period the central bank accumulated foreign-currency reserves that Euromoney put at about US$13 billion by 2006, equivalent to more than eighteen months of imports, in addition to some US$6 billion in gold.

In the banking sector, the central bank encouraged the consolidation of a fragmented industry through mergers, the largest of which was Bank Audi's acquisition of Banque Saradar in 2004. The Beirut Stock Exchange, closed since 1983, reopened on 22 January 1996 with an electronic trading system developed with the Paris bourse.

Prudential regulation was progressively tightened during the 2000s. The central bank prepared Lebanese banks for the adoption of the Basel II framework between 2004 and 2008 and, from 2004, restricted their exposure to structured and subprime-linked products — a restriction to which Salameh later attributed the sector's resilience during the 2008 financial crisis. The regulatory frameworks for electronic banking (Basic Circular 69 of March 2000) and for the control of banking operations against money laundering and terrorist financing (Basic Circular 83 of 2001) were established in the same period and repeatedly amended, notably in 2013 and 2016.

=== Institutional initiatives ===
==== École Supérieure des Affaires ====
The Banque du Liban was a founding partner of the École Supérieure des Affaires (ESA), a business school established in Beirut on 5 April 1996 under a Franco-Lebanese intergovernmental agreement and a convention between the central bank and the Paris Chamber of Commerce and Industry. The school, affiliated with the French ESCP Business School, launched its first programme, an MBA, in 1997, followed by an executive MBA in 1999, a research centre in 2003, a programme in hospital and health management in 2004, Islamic-finance programmes in 2007 and a doctorate in business administration in 2013. The school is co-chaired ex officio by the governor of the Banque du Liban and the French ambassador to Lebanon.

==== Middle East Airlines ====
In 1996 the central bank became the majority shareholder of the national carrier Middle East Airlines (MEA), acquiring almost all of its shares (99.3 per cent) in return for covering some US$375 million of the airline's accumulated losses. The airline was then loss-making and overstaffed, with losses peaking at about US$87 million in 1997. Under Salameh's governorship a new chairman, Mohamad El-Hout, a former central-bank economist, was appointed in 1998, and a restructuring programme carried out between 1998 and 2002 — fleet renewal, route rationalisation and the departure of more than a thousand employees — returned the airline to profit in 2002, with net profits of US$22 million in 2003 and US$50 million in 2004. MEA joined the SkyTeam alliance on 28 June 2012 as its seventeenth member.

=== 2005 political crisis and 2006 war ===
The assassination of Rafic Hariri on 14 February 2005 set off the most serious financial shock of Salameh's first decade in office. In the weeks that followed, about US$2 billion in deposits left the banking system and some US$5.5 billion of pound-denominated deposits were converted into dollars. The central bank intervened in the foreign-exchange market, drew on its reserves, conducted swap operations with commercial banks, raised interest rates and issued ten-year dollar certificates of deposit yielding about 10 per cent, designed to keep the banks' foreign assets in Lebanon.

Confidence returned within months. Deposit inflows resumed in the second half of 2005, a US$750 million Eurobond issue in October 2005 was heavily oversubscribed, and by March 2006 the spread on Lebanese sovereign debt had narrowed to roughly 180 basis points, in line with the emerging-market average.

When the 2006 Lebanon War broke out in July 2006, the central bank kept banks open and supplied foreign currency and liquidity throughout the conflict. Euromoney reported that Lebanon avoided a financial-market collapse, a bank run and a sell-off of the currency, and attributed this to the reserve position built up in the preceding years and to Salameh's handling of the crisis; the magazine described him as Lebanon's "financial firefighter". Its Central Bank Governor of the Year award, presented to him in Singapore in September 2006, cited his record over his tenure as a whole rather than the 2006 war alone.

=== Paris II and Paris III conferences ===
The central bank took part in the two international donor conferences convened in Paris to support Lebanon's public finances. At the Paris II conference of 23 November 2002, donors pledged about US$4.4 billion in concessional loans, most of it to refinance Lebanon's public debt at lower cost. As part of the accompanying domestic effort, the central bank agreed to reduce the interest it received on the government debt it held, and the commercial banks subscribed to two-year zero-interest government securities equal to 10 per cent of their deposits, about US$3.8 billion. The Paris III conference of 25 January 2007, held after the 2006 war, produced pledges of about US$7.6 billion in loans and grants from 38 states and institutions, tied to a government reform programme.

=== Subsidised lending and stimulus programmes ===
From the early 2000s Salameh extended the central bank's role beyond conventional monetary policy into development finance. Through a succession of circulars, the Banque du Liban exempted commercial banks from part of their reserve requirements, and subsidised interest, in proportion to the loans they extended to designated sectors — agriculture, industry, tourism, information technology and environmental projects among them. From 1999 banks were allowed to draw on up to 15 per cent of their reserves held at the central bank to fund housing loans through the Public Corporation for Housing (Établissement public de l'habitat) and other institutions. From November 2010 the National Energy Efficiency and Renewable Energy Action (NEEREA), a financing mechanism managed by the central bank with the support of the European Union, offered subsidised loans for energy-efficiency and renewable-energy projects; by early 2015 it had financed more than 200 projects worth over US$250 million. Loans to small and medium-sized enterprises guaranteed by Kafalat, a loan-guarantee company set up in 2000 by the National Institute for the Guarantee of Deposits and the commercial banks, benefited from interest subsidies administered by the central bank and from a partial exemption from reserve requirements.

In 2013 the central bank launched a stimulus package of about US$1.46 billion in credit facilities to banks at 1 per cent interest, to be lent on at subsidised rates for housing, productive sectors, education, renewable energy and start-ups; a further package of about US$800 million followed in 2014, and comparable packages were renewed each year until 2018, totalling more than US$6 billion. Housing loans absorbed the largest share of these facilities. In early 2018 the housing allocation was exhausted within weeks and the subsidised housing scheme was frozen for almost a year, contributing to a sharp slowdown in the property market. The International Monetary Fund described these programmes as quasi-fiscal schemes — some US$4.4 billion of subsidised credit, mostly to real estate, between 2013 and 2016 — that had weakened the central bank's income position, and urged it to withdraw from them.

=== Circular 331 and the start-up ecosystem ===
On 22 August 2013 the Banque du Liban issued Intermediate Circular 331, the most visible of the initiatives by which Salameh sought to diversify the Lebanese economy towards what the central bank called the "knowledge economy". Under the circular, the central bank guaranteed 75 per cent of the equity that Lebanese commercial banks invested in start-ups, venture-capital funds, incubators and accelerators, so that a bank would lose at most a quarter of its investment if a company failed. Investment was capped at 3 per cent of each bank's capital, an envelope initially estimated at US$400 million; an amendment of April 2016 raised the ceiling to 4 per cent, or roughly US$650 million.

The scheme is widely credited with creating a Lebanese venture-capital industry where almost none had existed. By 2017 some US$300–320 million had been raised under the circular, about half of it invested in more than forty start-ups, and several new venture funds, accelerators and co-working spaces had been established in Beirut. From 2014 the central bank also organised BDL Accelerate, an annual conference bringing together entrepreneurs, investors and international speakers; the 2015 edition drew about 6,000 participants.

The programme's limits became apparent from 2018, when the central bank began delaying the release of capital calls to the funds, and it was effectively suspended at the end of 2019 with the onset of the financial crisis; a later survey found that about half of the start-ups funded under the scheme had since moved all or part of their operations abroad.

=== Endeavors ===
Edward Gardner of the International Monetary Fund praised Salameh's policies: "You could have thought they had a crystal ball. It was very wise of the Lebanese regulators not to get involved in all these risky international investments that turned out to be the doom of many banking systems."

In a 2009 interview with Executive magazine, when asked when will Lebanon feel the impacts of the 2008 financial crisis, Salameh answered:

"Lebanon will not feel the effects of the financial crisis, because we took the necessary measures preemptively. This crisis has turned out to be a confidence crisis. Confidence in the banking sector in Lebanon and in the monetary in general, is very high, as witnessed by the large conversions from dollars to the Lebanese pound. In 2008, de-dollarization was important and the central bank bought more than $8 billion from the markets. Dollarization rates in deposits in the banking sector dropped from 77 percent to around 69 percent during 2008. The measures that we took preemptively were essentially based on preventing the banking sector from leveraging its balance sheets and on the other side, regulating the structured products and forbidding the acquisition of toxic assets — like the sub-prime — by banks. So the banking sector in 2008 recorded profits that were over $1 billion, which was the best year for them. The liquidity that we do have in our system will prevent any crisis in 2009."

In 2016, he launched “financial engineering” operations with local lenders, combining a series of swaps including government debt, and local currency and dollar deposits, which managed to attract foreign reserves and helped to support the country's dollar-pegged currency.

During the 2019–2020 Lebanese protests, Salameh had a feud with the Prime Minister Hassan Diab, as the government decided to default on its foreign obligations, but Salameh preferred to keep using foreign reserves to pay interest to international creditors.

Among the exceptional measures adopted during the crisis, the central bank issued Circular 152 on 6 August 2020, two days after the 2020 Beirut explosion, instructing banks to grant exceptional interest-free dollar loans, refinanced by the central bank, to individuals and businesses for the repair of damaged homes and premises. Circular 153 of 19 August 2020 allowed transfers of up to US$10,000 at the official exchange rate for Lebanese students enrolled abroad before 2020; criticised for excluding more recent students, it was followed by Law 193 of October 2020, the "student dollar" law, which the central bank implemented through Circular 155 of 9 December 2020. Banks' compliance was slow and partial, prompting protests and lawsuits; by April 2021 the Association of Banks reported that US$240 million had been transferred to some 30,000 students.

=== Other positions ===
Until 2023, Salameh chaired the Banque du Liban Central Council, the Higher Banking Commission, the AML/CFT Special Investigation Commission and the Capital Markets Authority. Salameh was a member of the board of governors at the International Monetary Fund (IMF) and at the Arab Monetary Fund (AMF).

== Controversies ==
=== Ponzi scheme allegations ===
Following the 2019–20 Lebanese protests, the Banque du Liban deposits declined by $31bn in one year, and the loan portfolio of lenders fell by $18bn, thus putting the country in its first financial crisis in three decades. The governor of the Central Bank of Lebanon, who has benefitted from an aura of prestige during 30 years, often referred to as the "magician" of finance, was, since March 2020, associated with this financial crisis by several opinions pages, such as An-Nahar and Bloomberg. According to them, Riad created a Ponzi scheme which has lasted for 30 years and which has led the State into bankruptcy and the national currency fall. French president Emmanuel Macron made the same comparison, calling for more transparency in the Lebanese financial system.

The governor answered those allegations that "the interest rates paid in Lebanon were lower than those paid in Egypt and Turkey." Also, he believes that he is "taken as a scapegoat."

=== Other allegations ===
In July 2020, a group of Lebanese lawyers formally accused Salameh of various crimes, including the embezzlement of central bank assets, and the mismanagement of public funds. On 20 July, Lebanese judge Faisal Makki ordered a protective freeze on some of Salameh's assets after ruling in favor of a complaint that he had allegedly undermined the financial standing of the state.

In August 2020, the Organized Crime and Corruption Reporting Project (OCCRP) reported that offshore companies owned by Salameh had overseas assets worth nearly US$100 million, primarily real estate, mostly in the United Kingdom, and also in Germany and Belgium.

At the end of December 2020, Riad Salameh, pointed out by some of the demonstrators, announced the opening of an ethical investigation. The inquiry is to audit the country's financial system and to verify whether political figures have used their position to override banking restrictions on foreign currency withdrawals and transfers of funds abroad.

In 2021, France and Switzerland opened investigations regarding money laundering by Salameh.

He was sanctioned by the United States in August 2023. He is included in the Specially Designated Nationals and Blocked Persons List which results in his assets being frozen and U.S. persons being prohibited from dealing with him.

He was detained in September 2024 after being questioned in several corruption cases and charged with embezzling $42 million in public funds. In October 2024, a judge in Mount Lebanon filed additional charges of illicit enrichment involving the renting of an apartment in France that was to be used as a substitute office for the Central Bank if necessary.

== Trial ==
In February 2022, a subpoena was issued by Judge Ghada Aoun after Riad Salameh failed to show up to court for questioning, while his whereabouts were unknown after a raid in his office and 2 homes, as part of an investigation for alleged misconduct and corruption. This sparked controversy with another security agency that was accused of protecting him from trial. Later in 21 March, Salameh along with his brother Raja were charged for illicit enrichment by Ghassan Oueidat but also failed to attend for questioning. His brother, Raja Salameh spent a month in detention but was released on 22 May while on a record bail of 100 billion LBP. Together with Raja, he is suspected setting up a money laundering scheme inside the Lebanese central bank through a 0.38% commission imposed by a shell company. On 21 June 2022, his home was raided again by Lebanese security forces.

In February 2023, Riad Salameh was charged with money laundering, embezzlement and illicit enrichment, following an 18-month investigation into allegations that he and his brother embezzled $300m from the Banque du Liban between 2002 and 2015.

In May 2023, Lebanon received an Interpol Red Notice against Riad Salameh after a French judge issued an arrest warrant on 16 May for "money laundering, fraud and participation in a criminal association with a view to committing offences [...]", following Salameh's failure to appear for a Paris court hearing. Interpol describes a Red Notice as a request to law-enforcement authorities worldwide to locate and provisionally arrest a person pending extradition, surrender or similar legal action, and says it is not itself an arrest warrant. On 23 May, a second Interpol Red Notice was issued against Salameh by Germany for "corruption charges, including forgery, money laundering and embezzlement". Salameh is the subject of multiple criminal investigations for financial wrongdoings, in both Lebanon and Europe.

In August 2024, a Paris judicial court indicted Salameh's brother, Raja, on charges of embezzlement of public funds, aggravated breach of trust, corruption and money laundering.

Riad Salameh was arrested on September 3, 2024, following an interrogation by the judiciary. His arrest is linked to serious allegations, including embezzlement, money laundering, and fraud related to financial commissions. This marked his first court appearance since leaving his position in July 2023. Following his interrogation, Salameh was moved to a higher-security prison as further questioning is expected. He was also facing legal issues from French authorities, who have issued Interpol red notices for his apprehension due to similar financial offenses.

In April 2025 it was reported that Judge Bilal Halawi, has issued a "presumptive decision" concluding that Riad Salameh, the former central bank governor, engaged in illicit enrichment by transferring funds from the central bank to private accounts, paving the way for his indictment. On August 26, 2025, the Beirut Indictment Chamber announced its decision regarding Salameh's release, setting bail of $20 million and LBP 5 million, and banning him from traveling for a year, as there is still an ongoing prosecution against him. On September 26, Salameh was released after posting bail of more than $14 million.

== Awards and honours ==
Salameh received a number of national and international distinctions during his governorship, most of them in the decade before the 2019 crisis.

In 1997 he was appointed a Knight (Chevalier) of the French Legion of Honour by President Jacques Chirac. At the ceremony in Beirut, the French ambassador, Daniel Jouanneau, credited him with the modernisation of the central bank, the revival of the Lebanese banking sector, the creation of new financial instruments and the rebuilding of Beirut as a regional financial centre, and described him as a key figure in Franco-Lebanese cooperation. He was promoted to Officer (Officier) of the Legion of Honour by President Nicolas Sarkozy in 2009.

In September 2006 Euromoney named him Central Bank Governor of the Year, an award presented during the IMF–World Bank annual meetings in Singapore and citing his management of the 2005 financial shock and the 2006 war as well as his record over the preceding thirteen years. The same magazine had named him best central bank governor in the Arab world in 1996, a distinction cited by the French ambassador in 1997, and best central bank governor in the Middle East in 2005.

In 2009 The Banker named him Central Banker of the Year for the Middle East. In March of the same year he rang the opening bell of the New York Stock Exchange, which Gulf News described as a first for an Arab central-bank governor; he also received the Arab Creativity Award in economics from the Arab Thought Foundation, presented by Prince Khalid Al-Faisal, and an honorary doctorate from the Lebanese American University. The Lebanese University awarded him an honorary doctorate in 2010, and the Hariri Canadian University an honorary sash and shield in 2011.

== Personal life and family ==
Salameh is married to Nada Karam, a Lebanese business woman who has also been investigated for money laundering and illicit enrichment, and together have 4 children. His nephew is Emile Salameh who has been charged by the French authorities with criminal conspiracy, money laundering and receiving stolen goods.

== See also ==
* HSBC and Lebanon banking controversy
