= Tenth Cabinet of Rashid Karami =

56th Cabinet of Lebanon

The Tenth Cabinet of Rashid Karami was the fifty-sixth cabinet of Lebanon, the second under President Amine Gemayel and the tenth headed by Prime Minister Rashid Karami. It was a national unity coalition and formed on 13 April 1984. President Gemayel asked Karami to form the cabinet although Karami had not been active in politics for four years. The mission of the government was to terminate the civil war in the country which had begun in 1975.

On 4 May 1987 Rashid Karami resigned from the office due to harsh criticism of Samir Geagea who was the head of the Lebanese Forces. His resignation was neither accepted nor rejected by President Gemayel, and Karami assumed the role of caretaker prime minister until his assassination in June 1987. Following this incident Selim Hoss became the acting prime minister and served in the post until September 1988.

== Composition ==
The cabinet members were as follows:

Tenth Cabinet of Rashid Karami
Portfolio	Minister	Political affiliation	Religious affiliation
Prime Minister	Rashid Karami	National Salvation Front	Sunni
Foreign Affairs	Rashid Karami	National Salvation Front	Sunni
Deputy Prime Minister	Victor Kassir	Independent	Greek Orthodox
Economy	Victor Kassir	Independent	Greek Orthodox
Industry	Victor Kassir	Independent	Greek Orthodox
Defence	Adel Osseiran	Independent	Shia
Agriculture	Adel Osseiran	Independent	Shia
Information	Joseph Skaff	Skaff Bloc	Greek Catholic
Housing	Camille Chamoun	National Liberal Party	Maronite
Finance	Camille Chamoun	National Liberal Party	Maronite
Telecommunications	Pierre Gemayel	Kataeb Party	Maronite
Social Affairs	Pierre Gemayel	Kataeb Party	Maronite
Health	Pierre Gemayel	Kataeb Party	Maronite
Interior	Abdullah Al Rasi	Independent	Greek Orthodox
Energy and Water	Nabih Berri	Amal Movement	Shia
Justice	Nabih Berri	Amal Movement	Shia
Education	Selim Hoss	Independent	Sunni
Labour	Selim Hoss	Independent	Sunni
Public Works	Walid Jumblatt	Progressive Socialist Party	Druze
Tourism	Walid Jumblatt	Progressive Socialist Party	Druze
