= Lebanese Canadian Bank =

Defunct commercial bank in Lebanon

The Lebanese Canadian Bank (Arabic: البنك اللبناني الكندي. abbreviated as LCB), now defunct as of 2011, was a bank based in Beirut in Lebanon, which maintained a network of 35 branches in Lebanon and a representative office in Montreal, Quebec, Canada. The bank was established in 1960 as Banque des Activities Economiques SAL and was a subsidiary of the Royal Bank of Canada Middle East from 1968 to 1988, when it became a privately owned Lebanese bank. LCB provided corporate, retail, and investment products, and maintained extensive correspondent accounts with banks worldwide, including several U.S. financial institutions. In 2009, LCB's total assets were worth more than $5 billion.

In 2011, the US Drug Enforcement Administration and US Treasury and other US government authorities took legal action against LCB alleging that LCB had helped launder hundreds of millions of dollars monthly for a drug trafficking network between South America and the Middle East and Europe, via West Africa, a network which also helped the funding of Hezbollah and other terrorist organizations and money laundering for the narcotics community. Hezbollah denied these claims, even though evidence show otherwise. The US Treasury Department banned LCB from dealing in dollars, resulting in a merger of the bank with the Lebanese subsidiary of Société Générale bank. In 2013, LCB agreed to pay $102 million in settlement of the action.

On July 11, 2008, American Express Bank and the Lebanese Canadian Bank was sued, in New York, for being the correspondent bank to the Yousser Company for Finance and Investment and the Martyrs Foundation. In addition, Canadian citizens filed the first civil action against the Lebanese Canadian Bank as victims of Hezbollah rocket attacks in a Canadian court.

On 3 March 2011 it was announced that LCB was to merge with French bank Société Générale. The sale was effected by a transfer of most of the bank's assets to the Lebanese subsidiary of Société Générale, Société Générale de Banque au Liban (SGBL).

== See also ==
- List of banks in Lebanon
- Société Générale de Banque au Liban (SGBL)
- Project Cassandra
