= Marwan Kheireddine =

Lebanese banker and businessman (born 1968)

Marwan Salim Kheireddine (Arabic: مروان سليم خير الدين; born February 14, 1968) is a Lebanese businessman and the non-executive chairman of AM Bank.

== Education ==
Kheireddine earned a bachelor's degree in business administration and economics from Richmond University in the United Kingdom, and an MBA from Columbia University, as well as postgraduate studies at Harvard University.

== Career ==
Kheireddine played a role in the creation of BDL Intermediary Circular 331, a regulation that finances entrepreneurs.

Kheireddine is a founding member of the Young Presidents’ Organization (YPO) - Lebanon chapter, created in 1999 and has since served in multiple positions including Chapter Chair, Education Officer, and Finance Officer. In addition he served as co-chair of the ‘YPO-London Business School Joint Executive Education Program’ from 2012 to 2014, where he also teaches an Introduction to Finance Session.

In 2005, Kheireddine was elected to the American University of Beirut, Olayan School of Business, Middle East Advisory Board. In 2012, he joined the Board of Trustees of the American Community School of Lebanon. He also serves on the board of trustees at USEK University.

Kheireddine served as Minister of State in the Government of Lebanon from 2011 to 2013 under PM Najib Mikati. In 2022, Kheireddine ran for parliament in Lebanon, but lost to Firas Hamdan. Kheireddine is a Druze.
