= Nadim Kassar =

Lebanese businessman

- Born: Beirut
- Citizenship: Lebanese
- Occupation: businessman
- Title: CEO of Fransabank

Nadim Kassar is a Lebanese businessman who has served as general manager of Fransabank.

== Background ==
Nadim Kassar was born in Beirut in May 1964. His grandfather Wafic Kassar was a judge who became his country's ambassador to Pakistan followed by an ambassadorship to Turkey, and founded the School of Law in Lebanon. Nadim Kassar's uncle, Adnan Kassar, along with his brother, set up the family business as well as serving as a Minister of State and chairing the Lebanese Chamber of Commerce for three decades. Adnan Kassar's was Chairman of Fransabank, which his nephew, Nadim, now runs as general manager. Nadim Kassar's father has also developed his career in banking, becoming CEO and Deputy Chairman of Fransabank and chairing several of its subsidiaries along with being honorary Consul General to the Republic of Hungary.

Lebanon has a long established tradition of acting as a vital hub of business activity in the region and elsewhere. Nadim Kassar is one of a new generation of Lebanese businessmen who are striving to put Lebanon back to its central position as a world business centre, in his case through the Lebanese banking industry where he currently works at Fransabank. Established in 1921, Fransabank is today one of Lebanon's main banks, although currently operating under the aegis of the French-based Crédit Agricole bank.

== Professional life ==
Nadim Kassar gained first-hand experience in the family run A. A. Kassar trade and investment company, which was first established in 1949. Alongside his work experience during this period, Nadim Kassar attended American University in Beirut and was awarded a BA in Business Administration in 1986. After graduation from the University, he continued working for the family business, eventually rising to the position of general manager. To complement his role in the family company, Kassar also spent his afternoons working at Fransabank, gaining skills and experience in banking and finance. This involvement and interest developed to the point where he decided to move across to Fransabank in 1990, where again he rose to occupy the key position of general manager.

He founded Fransabank El Djazair in Algeria, currently the only Lebanese bank in that country, as well as founding Fransabank's investment arm, Fransa Invest Bank. During his time as general manager, the bank has also grown its network of outlets to 107 branches strategically sited across the country. 2010 saw the bank achieve a record performance with profits up by almost 40%, and this at a time when many banks across the world were struggling to succeed. The bank's ratio of capital reserves were also maintained though this difficult period at a healthy 12%, protecting the bank from sudden worldwide fluctuations in economic and financial activity.

In 2008, Nadim Kassar was given an award by the Arab Women's Forum for his contribution to Fransabank, and in 2011, the bank's 90th anniversary year, he also sponsored an award-winning Lebanese film, 'Stray Bullet', to encourage the development of modern culture in Lebanon. Other professional achievements include the introduction of Microsoft PC loans to help with the spread of computer access and providing access to PayPass to speed up card transactions.

== Personal life ==
In addition to his banking career and family, Nadim Kassar takes time to pursue a number of recreational interests ranging from skiing and other outdoor sports, traveling widely and riding on the famed and lively Arabian horses.
