= Illicit enrichment =

Legal concept

Illicit enrichment generally refers to a situation in which a person has enjoyed some sort of wealth that cannot or has not been justified as coming from a legitimate source of income. The exact definitions for illicit enrichment, and the terminology used to describe the concept, vary considerably between international legal instruments and domestic laws.

== Varying terminology ==
The terminology surrounding the concept varies considerably. Many countries, of course, use the term "illicit enrichment" (e.g. Afghanistan), or similar non-English terms such as “enrichissement illicite” (e.g. Mauritania), “enriquecimiento ilícito” (e.g. Mexico), or “enriquecimento ilícito” (e.g. Mozambique). Other countries, however, refer to the same concept by using phrases such as the acquisition, possession or control of “unexplained wealth” (e.g. Sierra Leone), “unexplained assets” (e.g. Kenya), or “unexplained property” (e.g. Antigua and Barbuda). Other countries again refer to the concept as “illegal gains” (e.g. Egypt), “unjustified enrichment” (e.g. Panama), “property deemed to be acquired illegally” (e.g. Nepal) or even “liability for corrupt acquisitions” (e.g. Seychelles).

=== Variance in scope of definitions ===
The scope of definitions for illicit enrichment also vary considerably throughout the world.

International legal instruments have taken a consistently narrow approach when defining the concept. These instruments generally only regard illicit enrichment as a concept that relates to corruption and only include limiting terms such as 'an increase in assets' when describing the form a person's illicit enrichment may take.

Domestic laws have often taken a much broader approach when defining illicit enrichment. Rather than just limiting the concept of illicit enrichment to include an increase in assets, legislators in dozens of countries around the world have defined illicit enrichment to also include unjustifiable increases in a person's ‘standard of living’ (e.g. Bhutan), ‘train de vie’ (e.g. Senegal) or ‘modo de vida’ (e.g. São Tomé and Príncipe).

Additionally, while the international instruments only take into account the enrichment of ‘public officials’ or ‘government officials’, many countries take a much broader interpretation in their own laws and define illicit enrichment as an act that can be committed by ‘any person’ (e.g. Rwanda).

== Illicit enrichment laws ==
Illicit enrichment laws are those that target situations where a person has illicitly enriched themselves - or has enjoyed some sort of wealth that has not been justified as coming from lawful sources of income. Illicit enrichment laws are unique from other types of proceeds of crime-focused laws as they do not require a state to establish that any sort of criminal activity has taken place. Instead, if a court is satisfied that a person has enjoyed some sort of wealth, and that this wealth has not been established as being derived from a legal source, then the court will be permitted to impose some sort of criminal or civil sanction (depending on the relevant law).

While the majority of laws targeting illicit enrichment (also known as ‘unexplained wealth’ or ‘unexplained assets’) are based in criminal procedure, there are also a number of laws based in civil procedure that similarly target situations of illicit enrichment.

=== Criminal illicit enrichment laws ===
Criminal illicit enrichment laws are those that are based in criminal procedure. They constitute a criminal offence, and can therefore result in a criminal punishment. An example of a criminal illicit enrichment law is the offence found in Section 10 of Hong Kong's Prevention of Bribery Ordinance 1971. Another example is that of Argentina, which is contained in Article 268(2) of the country's Criminal Code.

=== Civil illicit enrichment laws ===
There are also laws based in civil procedure that target illicit enrichment. These civil illicit enrichment laws generally use terms such as 'unexplained wealth' or 'unexplained assets' to describe the situation of illicit enrichment that is being targeted. These types of laws do not attract criminal punishments, but instead result in civil orders made against the relevant person to repay the value of the amount of wealth that they are unable to justify as coming from legal sources. An example of this type of law is the “unexplained wealth declaration” mechanism contained in Western Australia's Criminal Property Confiscation Act.

=== Qualified illicit enrichment laws ===
There are also both criminal and civil laws that exist that target illicit enrichment in the same way as the two categories of laws described above, but for the fact that they also require an additional threshold of proof to be met, namely that there is a 'reasonable suspicion' or a 'reasonable belief' that some sort of criminal activity has occurred. An example of this type of law is contained in Kenya's Anti-Corruption and Economic Crimes Act.
