= Cedrus Bank =

Lebanese bank

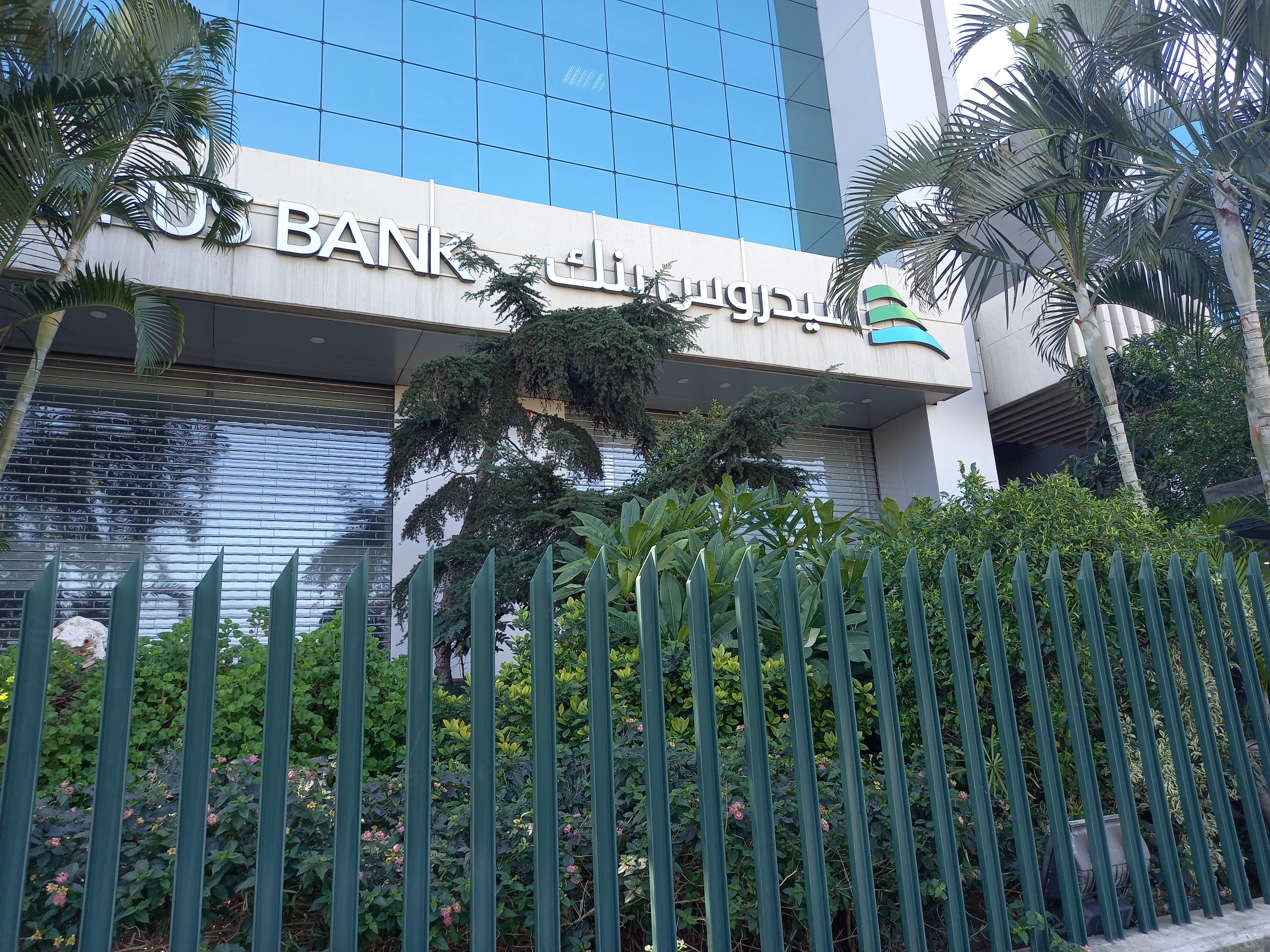
A photo of the outside of the branch in Sin el Fil on 6 March 2021

Cedrus Bank (French: Cedrus Bank; Arabic: سيدروس بنك) (part of the Cedrus Group) is a Lebanese bank founded in 2015, which caters to individuals and businesses in Lebanon and the region.

On March 3, 2018, Cedrus Invest Bank announced the acquisition of Standard Chartered Bank in Lebanon and the launch of Cedrus Bank. Cedrus Invest Bank owns 85% of the capital of Cedrus Bank, which amounted to $60 million in 2018, with the remaining 15% going to Nicolas Chammas, president of the Beirut Traders Association.

Fadi Assali, cofounder of Cedrus Invest Bank, was appointed CEO of the new bank and Nicolas Chammas vice-president.

== Allegations ==
The bank is known to be owned by President Michel Aoun and his family, who have denied that allegation.

== Headquarters ==
Cedrus Bank has its headquarters in Dbayeh with two branches in Verdun and Achrafieh.
