= Fransabank =

Lebanese commercial bank

Fransabank S.A.L
- Type: public
- Industry: Financial services
- Founded: 1921; 105 years ago
- Headquarters: Beirut, Lebanon
- Number of locations: 125 branches
- Products: Banking
- Website: fransabank.com

Fransabank (Arabic: فرنسبنك ) is one of the oldest banks in Lebanon. Today, Fransabank Group has a consolidated presence in eight countries: Lebanon, France, Algeria, Sudan, Belarus, Iraq, UAE (Abu Dhabi) and Ivory Coast. The Group also ranks first in terms of local branch network with 125 branches strategically spread all over the country.

== History ==
In 1921, the Bank opened as a branch of Crédit Foncier d'Algérie et de Tunisie (CFAT).

In 1963, the CFAT was renamed to the new name of Société Centrale de Banque, and in 1971 its Lebanese entity was purchased by Banque Française pour le Moyen-Orient SAL (BFMO), a Lebanese banking company. After numerous mergers with other Lebanese banks, in 1982 the bank was renamed Fransabank.

== See also ==
- BankMed
- Banque Libano-Française
- Crédit Libanais
- Saradar Bank
- Société Générale de Banque au Liban (SGBL)
- Lebanese Swiss Bank
- List of banks in Lebanon
