= Lebanese Swiss Bank =

Bank in Lebanon

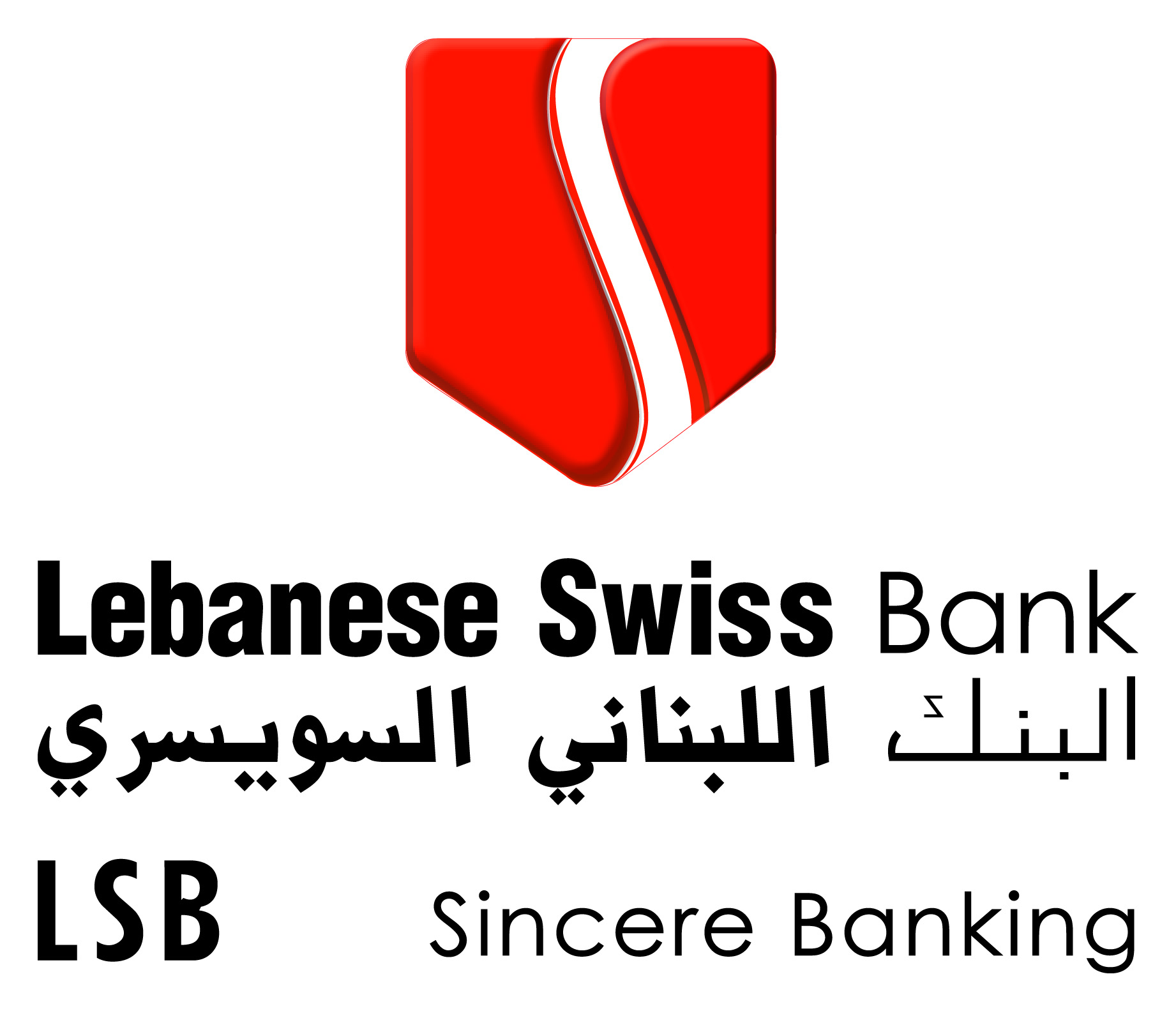
- Company type: Financial Institution
- Industry: Bank
- Founded: 1962 in Beirut, Lebanon
- Headquarters: Emile Edde Street, Hamra, Beirut, Lebanon; Swiftcode:LEBSLBBX
- Key people: Tanal Sabbah (Chairman and General Manager)
- Products: Retail, Corporate, and Private Banking
- Website: www.lebaneseswissbank.com

Lebanese Swiss Bank SAL (Arabic: البنك اللبناني السويسري. abbreviated as LSB) is a Lebanese financial institution established in 1962 and headquartered in Beirut, Lebanon. LSB offers various banking products and services covering Retail, Corporate, and Private Banking to a diversified client base.

== History ==
Lebanese Swiss bank was originally licensed in the early 1962 in Lebanon. In 1973, it was acquired by Credit Suisse, Zurich which controlled 99.01 percent of shares operating under the name of Credit Suisse (Moyen-Orient) SAL.

Years later in 1988 the bank’s shares were acquired by a group of Lebanese investors and businessmen and the name was changed to Lebanese Swiss Bank SAL.

Sabbah was appointed Chairman of the Board and General Manager.

Currently Lebanese Swiss Bank has 18 local branches with its Head Office in Hamra area.
