= Credit Libanais =

Lebanese bank

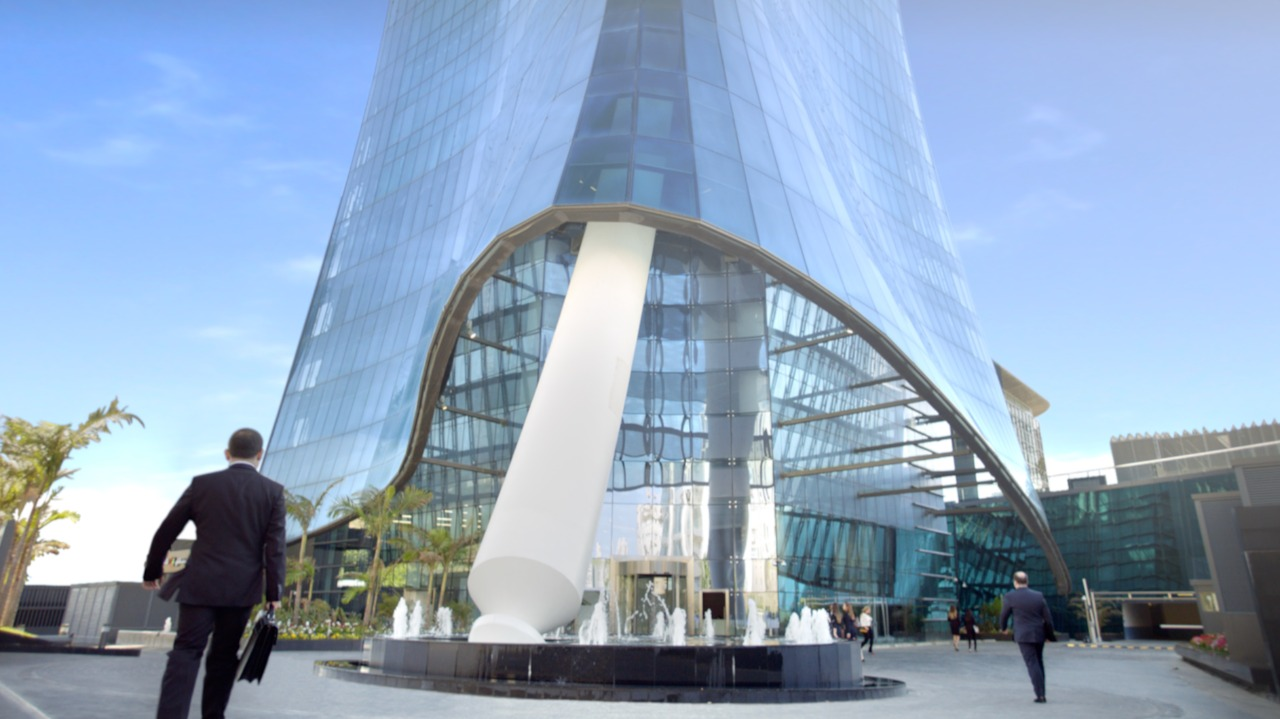
- Credit Libanais Headquarters, Pierre Gemayel Boulevard, Adlieh
- Native name: بنك الاعتماد اللبناني
- Company type: Joint stock company
- Industry: Financial services
- Founded: 1961; 64 years ago
- Headquarters: Beirut, Lebanon
- Products: Banking services, Islamic banking, insurance, leasing, real estate
- Website: www.creditlibanais.com.lb

Credit Libanais (Arabic: بنك الاعتماد اللبناني) is a Lebanese bank, established in 1961. Having originated with one branch in Riad El Solh Square, today the Bank is headquartered in Adlieh and has a wide network of branches in Lebanon, Cyprus, Bahrain, and Senegal. Credit Libanais provides alongside key classical banking activities, Islamic banking, insurance, leasing, real estate, tourism and ticketing, debt collection services, information technology, and advertising.

== History ==
Credit Libanais SAL was established in 1961 as a Lebanese joint stock company. In 1996, the Bank issued the first Euro CDs listed on foreign stock markets. In 2005, Credit Libanais launched its Islamic banking operations through its subsidiary, the Lebanese Islamic Bank.

== Acquisitions ==
Throughout its history, Credit Libanais acquired many banks in Lebanon such as Continental Bank in 1977, First Phoenician Bank and Capital Trust Bank in 1994, and the operations of American Express Bank in Lebanon in 2000.

== Subsidiaries ==
- Credit Libanais d'Assurance et de Reassurance (CLA)
- Collect SAL

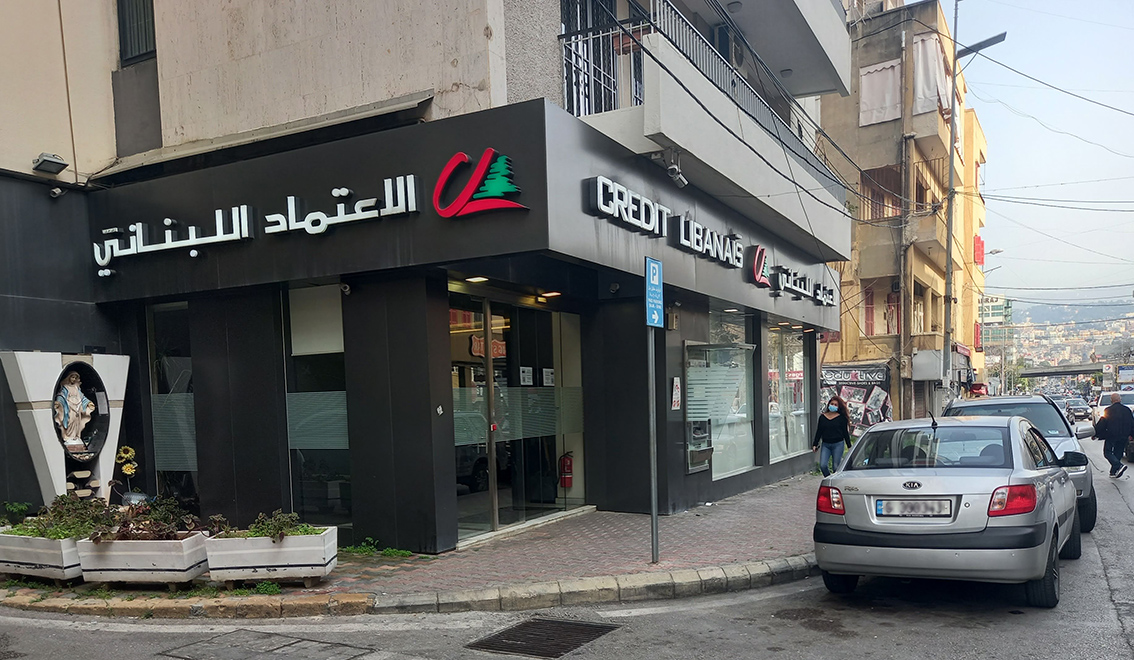
Credit Libanais bank, Furn el Chebbak branch

- Credilease
- Credit Card Management
- Lebanese Islamic Bank
- Net Commerce
- Soft Management
- Hermes Tourism & Travel
- IPN Participant Banks

== Shareholders ==
- CIH Bahrain International Holding SAL with 35.06%.
- EFG Hermes CL Holding SAL with 8.81%.
- Other grouped with 56.13%.
