= Banque Libano-Française S.A.L. =

Lebanese bank

Banque libano-française S.A.L
- Type: Public
- Industry: Banking
- Founded: Beirut, Lebanon (1967)
- Headquarters: Liberty Plaza building, Rome Street, Beirut, Lebanon
- Area served: Lebanon; France; Cyprus; Switzerland; United Arab Emirates; Nigeria
- Number of employees: 800+
- Parent: Banque Libano-Française
- Website: www.eblf.com

Banque Libano-Française (French pronunciation: [bɑ̃k libano fʁɑ̃sɛːz]; BLF; Arabic: البنك اللبناني الفرنسي, romanized: al-Bank al-Lubnānī l-Faransī) is a Lebanese bank holding number 10 on Banque du Liban List of Banks. It was established as a joint stock company in 1967. Its head office is located at the Beirut Liberty Plaza Building, Hamra District, Beirut, Lebanon.

As at end of December 2025, BLF operates in Lebanon through a network of 36 branches, 1 e-branch and 176 ATMs. Abroad, BLF Group is present in France and Cyprus (Banque SBA), in Switzerland (LF Finance Suisse), in the United Arab Emirates (a representative office in Abu Dhabi), and in Nigeria (a representative office in Lagos). The Bank employs a total of 801 staff, including 717 in Lebanon.

It is also available through several digital channels, namely the My BLF mobile apps.

While it has historically been a commercial bank, the bank has diversified its activities and currently provides banking services in five principal areas: commercial banking, investment banking, retail banking, private banking, treasury and capital markets and correspondent banking.

BLF is also a member of the Association of Banks in Lebanon.

== History ==
- Banque Libano-Française (BLF) was created in 1930 as a branch of the French bank, Compagnie Algérienne.
- In 1967, BLF became a bank established under the Lebanese law, with 70% French shareholding.
- In 1970, Banque Indosuez acquired a 5% direct interest in the bank capital.
- In 1973, Banque Indosuez increased its stake to 20% through a partial acquisition of the shares of Compagnie Française de Crédit et de Banque (former Compagnie Algérienne de Crédit et de Banque), which became known as Parthena Investment.
- In 1992, Banque Indosuez increased its shareholding in Banque Libano-Française to 51%.
- In 1999, BLF acquired 100% of Crédit Agricole Indosuez Liban (CAIL), a financial institution specialized in securities brokerage and portfolio management.
- In 2004, Crédit Agricole Group decided to reduce its exposure in Lebanon, in anticipation of the implementation of Basle II. Therefore, Calyon (former Crédit Agricole Indosuez) reduced its participation in the bank to 9%.
- In 2006, BLF finalized the acquisition of 78.3% of Banque SBA shares, established in France (Paris) with a financial subsidiary in Geneva known as LF Finance (Switzerland) SA and a branch in Cyprus (Limassol).
- In 2009, BLF obtained an official license from the UAE Central Bank to establish a Representative Office in Abu Dhabi.
- In 2012, the bank reinforced its operations in the MENA region by opening a Representative Office in Lagos, Nigeria and a branch in Baghdad, Iraq.
- On September 1, 2014, Farid Raphaël, founder of Banque Libano-Française and its chairman general manager from 1979, died.
- On September 15, 2014, Walid Raphaël was elected by the board of directors as chairman general manager of the bank.
- In 2015, the bank teamed up with Allianz SNA to launch 5 new non-life insurance plans to help protect its clients against various risks.
- In January 2016, BLF launched the international architecture competition to build its new headquarters.
- In July 2016, it announced Norwegian-American studio Snøhetta as the winner of the competition, selected by the International Jury.
- In 2017, the bank expanded its local network to 58 branches and more than 172 ATMs.
- In 2018, BLF opened two branches in Kfarhbab and Tyre-Hoche, expanding its local network to 60 branches and more than 181 ATMs, and its first e-branch in Mar Mikhaël.
- In 2019, BLF continued to implement the bank's digital strategy with the opening of another e-branch in Badaro, the launch of "My LTBY" application for the youth, and the enhancement of "My BLF" features. In the last quarter of 2019, the bank had to cope with the terrible socio-economic crisis that hit Lebanon.
- In 2020, Banque Libano-Française continued to face the terrible socio-economic crisis in Lebanon.
- In 2021, despite the ongoing crisis, BLF remained committed to its customers and the Lebanese market. The bank implemented the Central Bank of Lebanon's circulars, enhanced digital platforms, restructured its branch network to meet evolving needs and maintained liquidity ratios that are well above Central Bank requirements.
- In 2022, BLF reinforced its commitment to technological advancement by launching new features on its My BLF mobile application and e-banking platform. Recognizing the importance of a skilled and agile workforce, the bank did not make redundant any of its staff. Rather, it strategically reallocated its human resources to better serve its customers while maintaining operational efficiency.
- In 2023, the economic and social crisis persisted. BLF maintained compliance with the Central Bank of Lebanon's circulars while further enhancing the digitalization of its services. A key initiative in this effort was a strategic partnership with Purpl, further expanding access to convenient and innovative digital banking solutions.
- In 2024, while facing economic and social challenges, BLF emphasized the digitization of its services to enhance the accessibility of its financial solutions.

== Board of directors ==
- Walid Raphaël (Chairman)
- Zafer Chaoui
- Philippe Doré
- Mounir Letayf
- Libano Holding S.A.L., represented by Élie Nahas
- Financière Raphaël Holding S.A.L., represented by Raya Raphaël Nahas

== Capital and financial figures ==
BLF capital is LBP 265 billion.

== See also ==
- List of Banks in Lebanon
- Banque du Liban
- Bank Audi
- Byblos Bank
- Fransabank
- Economy of Lebanon
