= Bank Audi =

Lebanon based bank

Bank Audi S.A.L.

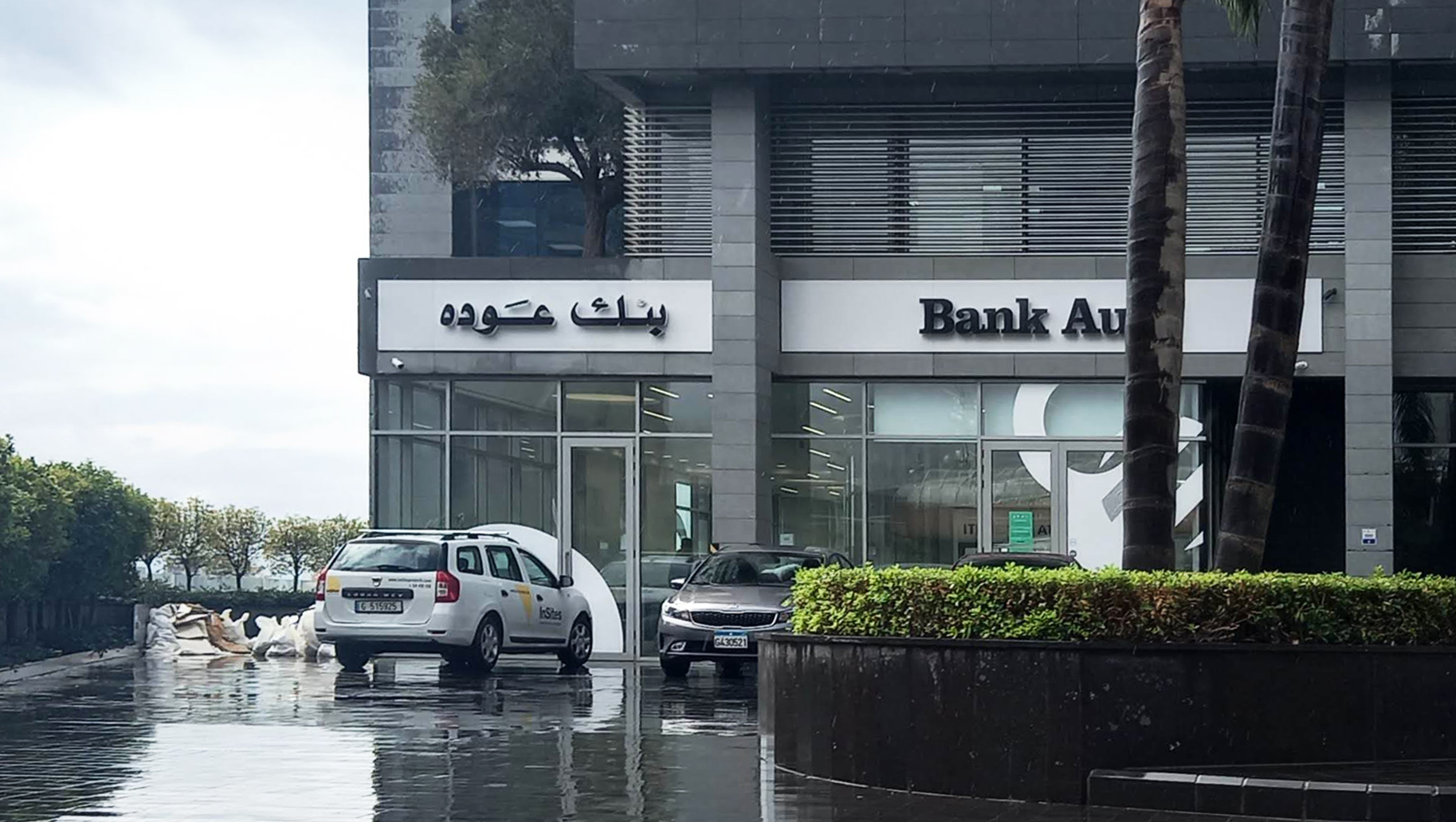
- Branch at Sin el Fil, Beirut
- Type: Société anonyme libanaise
- Traded as: Beirut Stock Exchange: AUDI; LSE: BQAD
- Industry: Financial services
- Founded: Beirut, Lebanon (1830)
- Headquarters: Beirut, Lebanon
- Area served: Lebanon; Europe; (Switzerland, France); MENA; (KSA, Qatar, UAE)
- Key people: Raymond Audi (co-founder)
- Products: Consumer banking, corporate banking, insurance, investment banking, mortgage loans, private banking, private equity, wealth management, credit cards, treasury and capital markets
- Number of employees: 1,600+ (June 2026)
- Website: www.bankaudigroup.com www.bankaudi.com.lb

Bank Audi (Arabic: بنك عودة, previously Bank Audi-Saradar) is a Lebanon-based universal bank and financial services company headquartered in Beirut, offering financial products and services in personal banking, business banking, private banking and Treasury and Capital Markets segments.

Bank Audi operates principally in Lebanon, in Europe, in the MENA region.

As at end-June 2026, Bank Audi’s consolidated assets reached LBP 1,308,314 billion, principally driven by private customers’ deposits of LBP 1,108,687 billion, with shareholders’ equity reaching LBP 102,850 billion.

Bank Audi’s group staff headcount exceeds 1,600 employees and its shareholders’ base encompass more than 1,500 holders of common shares and/or holders of Global Depositary Receipts (GDRs) representing common shares.

== History ==
Bank Audi was founded in 1830, but was only incorporated as a bank in 1962.

Members of the Audi family, as well as Kuwaiti investors, were the first shareholders. Since 1983, the shareholder base has expanded. In 2004, Bank Audi signed a merger agreement with Banque Saradar.

On 20 February 2019, Bank Audi announced a new deposit agreement by which The Bank of New York Mellon is named the successor depositary bank for its global depositary receipt programme, replacing Deutsche Bank Trust Company Americas as Depositary.

In January 2021, First Abu Dhabi Bank signed a final agreement to acquire 100% of the Egyptian subsidiary of Bank Audi.

After former Central Bank of Lebanon governor Riad Salameh was charged with embezzling $330 million in public funds, the Swiss financial regulator FINMA launched investigations into Lebanese banks with operations in Switzerland and in 2024 censured Bank Audi for serious money laundering violations.

== See also ==
- List of Banks in Lebanon
- Banque du Liban
- Economy of Lebanon
