= Banque du Liban =

Central bank of Lebanon

Banque du Liban مصرف لبنان (Arabic)

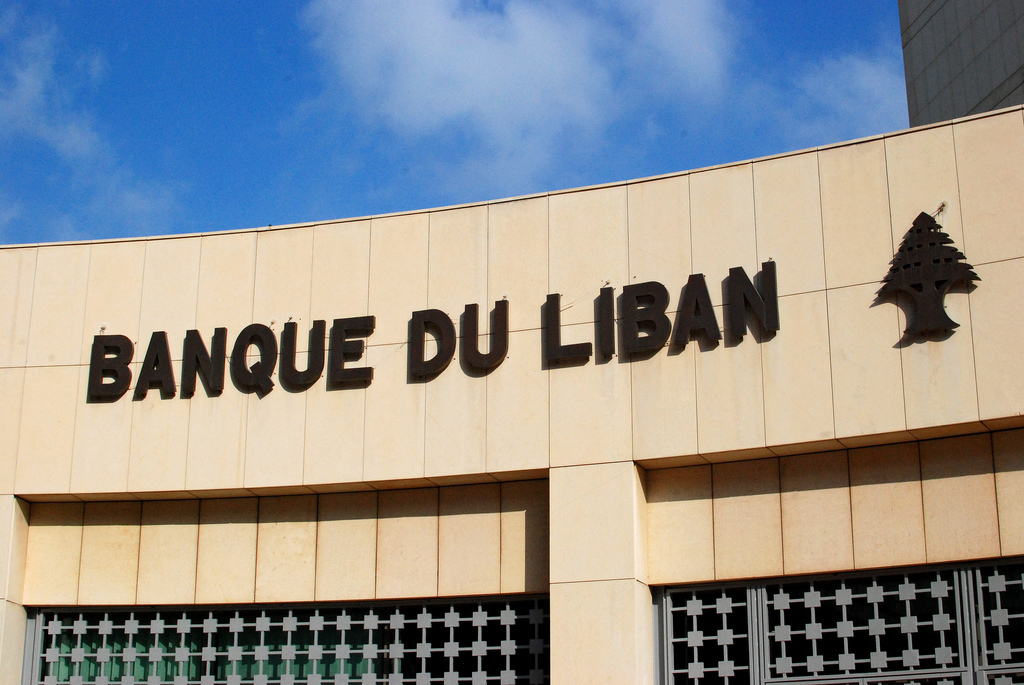
- French language inscription "Banque du Liban" on the headquarters of the Bank of Lebanon.
- Central bank of: Lebanon
- Headquarters: Beirut, Lebanon
- Established: August 1, 1963 (63 years ago)
- Ownership: 100% state ownership
- Governor: Karim A. Souaid
- Currency: Lebanese pound LBP (ISO 4217)
- Reserves: $14.7 billion
- Bank rate: 2.75%
- Interest on reserves: 4.00%
- Website: www.bdl.gov.lb

Banque du Liban (French; Arabic: مصرف لبنان, romanized: Maṣraf Lubnān; English: Bank of Lebanon) is the central bank of Lebanon. It was established on August 1, 1963, and became fully operational on April 1, 1964.

One of the main responsibilities of the bank is issuing Lebanon's currency, the Lebanese pound. Other responsibilities include maintaining monetary stability, regulation of money transfers, and maintaining the soundness of the banking sector. Banking is a very important part of Lebanon's economy with over 100 different banks, which makes the role of BdL particularly important. It currently owns 99.37% of the shares of Lebanon's national carrier, Middle East Airlines. The BdL is also the dominant shareholder of the Intra Investment Company (IIC), which in turn owns 53% of Casino du Liban, making it the only central bank worldwide to rule over a Las Vegas–style gambling casino.

Besides the main branch in Beirut, it has branches in Aley, Baalbeck, Bikfaya, Jounieh, Nabatiye, Sidon, Tripoli, Tyre, and Zahlé.

== Background ==
Ottoman domination of Lebanon, which lasted for more than four centuries, was brought to an end on October 6, 1918, with the entry of the Levant Marine Division into Beirut. The paper money issued by the Turkish Treasury, with a forced exchange rate, suffered the same fate.

In order to normalize economic life in the occupied territories and cover the expenses of the allied forces, British authorities imposed the banknotes of the National Bank of Egypt, the Egyptian currency having been, since October 30, 1916, closely linked to sterling and entirely covered by securities issued in sterling.

In accordance with the convention signed between the French and British governments on September 15, 1919, a new occupying authority started to rule Lebanon. French troops replaced the British, under the command of General Gouraud, who was appointed on October 12, 1919, as "High-Commissioner of the French Republic in Syria and Cilicia, and Commander-in-Chief of the Levant Army". Consequently, the use of the Egyptian currency, suitable for the British Treasury, became inappropriate. To obtain Egyptian pounds, France, being the sole occupying power, had to offer increasing amounts of francs.

During World War I, the French franc had maintained its status thanks to advances from the British and American treasuries. However, in 1919, the French franc registered a drop because of the British government's decision to stop these advances, thus breaking the alliance between the franc, sterling and the dollar, and also because of the United States Government's decision to suspend its regulating role of the associated change rates. In order to replace the Egyptian pound, the French government decided, by Decree N° 129 issued by the High Commissioner on March 13, 1920, to endow Syria with a national currency.

On September 1, 1920, the representative of France proclaimed Greater Lebanon. In 1920, the Banque de Syrie et Liban ("Bank of Syria and of Lebanon"), which had been created for that purpose by the French-controlled Ottoman Bank, was granted the concession of issuing the Syrian–Lebanese currency, which became legal tender on May 1, 1920. Banknotes issued by this bank were reimbursable to the bearer or at sight by checks drawn on Paris, at the rate of FF 20 for £S 1 .

As a consequence, an independent, currency-issuing department was established at the Banque de Syrie et Liban. It was responsible for putting in circulation and withdrawing banknotes. Issuances were made either on behalf of the Treasury in Paris or on behalf of the Bank itself.

Concerning commercial operations, the Issuing Department was to provide the Banque de Syrie with banknotes only in exchange of foreign currencies or foreign securities, which constituted, together with the credits granted by the Treasury in Paris, the coverage of the currency in circulation. The Banque de Syrie et du Liban's Issuing Department would later form the basis for the establishment of the Banque du Liban.

== Role and function ==
The Banque du Liban was established by the Code of Money and Credit promulgated on 1 August 1963, by decree no. 13513. It started to operate effectively on 1 April 1964. BDL is a legal public entity enjoying financial and administrative autonomy. It is not subject to the administrative and management rules and controls applicable to the public sector. Its capital is totally appropriated by the State.

== Governing body ==
The Banque du Liban is managed by the Governor, who is assisted by four vice governors as well as by the Central Council. By convention, the Governor of the Banque du Liban is always a Maronite Christian.

The Governor is the legal representative of the Banque du Liban and has extensive authority over the management of the bank. He is entrusted with the enforcement of the Code of Money and Credit and the implementation of the Central Council's resolutions. Upon the proposal of the Minister of Finance, the Governor is appointed by decree sanctioned by the Council of Ministers, for a renewable six-year term. After the consultation with the governor and upon the proposal of the Minister of Finance, the vice governors are appointed by decree sanctioned by the Council of Ministers for a renewable five-year term. They assist the Governor in managing the bank, carrying out functions specified by the Governor. In addition, they assume their duties as members of the Central Council.

=== Governors ===
List of governors of the Banque du Liban:

No.	Image	Name (Signature)	Term start	Term end	Time in office	Notes
1		Philippe Takla (1915–2006)	August 28, 1963	June 6, 1967	3 years, 292 days	Was first elected to the Lebanese parliament in a by-election held in May 1945 in Mount Lebanon as a result of the death of his father, Salim Takla
2		Elias Sarkis (1924–1985)	June 7, 1967	June 2, 1976	8 years, 352 days	Also served 6th president of Lebanon the same year as the end of his tenure.
-		Joseph Oughourlian	June 2, 1976	September 6, 1978	2 years, 96 days	Ad Interim
3		Michel el-Khoury	September 6, 1978	January 15, 1985	6 years, 131 days	Also Served as Defense minister between 1965 and 1966
4		Edmond Naïm	January 15, 1985	January 16, 1991	6 years, 1 day	Politically aligned with the Progressive Socialist Party and was later an MP for the Lebanese Forces.
(3)		Michel el-Khoury	January 16, 1991	June 7, 1993	2 years, 142 days	Also Served as Defense minister between 1965 and 1966
5		Riad Salamé	June 7, 1993	July 31, 2023	30 years, 54 days	In February 2022, a subpoena was issued by Judge Ghada Aoun after Riad Salameh failed to show up to court for questioning, while is whereabouts were unknown after a raid in his office and 2 homes, as part of an investigation for alleged misconduct and corruption. This sparked controversy with another security agency that was accused of protecting him from trail. Later in March 21, Salameh along with his brother Raja were charged for illicit enrichment by Ghassan Oueidat but also failed to attend for questioning.
-		Wassim Mansouri	July 31, 2023	March 27, 2025	1 year, 239 days	Ad Interim
6		Karim A. Souaid	March 27, 2025	Incumbent	1 year, 226 days	Lebanese financial expert, private equity investor, and banking governance specialist and as of March 2025, Lebanon's new central bank governor. He is the Founder and Managing Partner of Growthgate Equity Partners, a private equity firm focusing on investments in the Gulf Cooperation Council (GCC) and the broader MENA region. Souaid is recognized for his opposition to Hezbollah's influence in Lebanon’s financial system.

=== Central Council ===
The Central Council sets the monetary and credit policies of the Bank, including money supply, and discount and lending rates. It discusses and decides, among other things, on issues concerning the banking and financial sectors, the establishment of clearinghouses, the issuing of currency and loan requests by public sector entities. The Council decides also on the rules and procedures that govern the staff and operations of the Bank, and on its annual budget and accounts. The members of the Central Council are:

- The Governor, as chairman.
- The four vice governors.
- The Director General of the Ministry of Finance, ex officio but strictly as member of the council.
- The Director General of the Ministry of Economy and Trade, ex officio but strictly as a member of the council.

=== Capital Markets Authority ===
The management of the Capital Markets Authority (CMA) is entrusted to a board formed of seven members and chaired by the Governor of Banque du Liban, the central bank of Lebanon. The board is composed of three full-time executive board members who are experts in capital markets, banking and financial affairs, and three part-time members representing ministries and other authorities directly involved in the work of the CMA: The Director General of the Ministry of Finance, the Director General of the Ministry of Economy and Trade and the Chairman of the Banking Control Commission.

The CMA Board has extensive powers that aim to enhance investor protection and promote investment in the financial markets. It has the power to establish general regulations concerning the establishment and management of stock exchanges, as well as regulations concerning the establishment and functioning of financial intermediation institutions which manage investment funds and collective investment schemes for the public. The CMA board is entrusted by Law 161/2011 to set the code of conduct for stock exchange institutions and their employees, as well as financial service providers and their employees. The CMA board has the power to regulate governance-related issues, such as the obligations of financial instrument issuers to publish and disclose to the public price-sensitive information. In the same context, the CMA board has the power to license the establishment and functioning of financial intermediation institutions, approve securitization activities, ratify (or cancel previous ratification of) the decisions taken by the administration of each stock exchange concerning the registration of securities and financial instruments; and approve the regulations set by the administrations of stock exchanges concerning the transactions undertaken on such stock exchanges.

Moreover, the CMA Board is mandated by law to issue consultations and opinion on draft laws and decrees related to the work and development of the capital markets in Lebanon.

=== Special Investigation Commission ===
The Special Investigation Commission (SIC) is a multi-function financial intelligence unit (FIU) with judicial status. It is the centerpiece of Lebanon's anti–money laundering (AML) and combating the financing of terrorism (CFT) regime, a platform for international cooperation and plays a vital role in safeguarding concerned sectors from illicit proceeds. The SIC's tasks include receiving and analyzing suspicious transaction reports (STRs), conducting financial investigations, lifting banking secrecy, freezing accounts and/or transactions and forwarding them to concerned judicial authorities. With respect to terrorism and the financing of terrorism, the SIC is also empowered to prevent the use of movable or immovable assets. In addition to sharing ML/TF intelligence with counterparts and coordinating with foreign/local competent authorities on requests of assistance (ROAs), the SIC also proposes AML/CFT regulations and issues new regulations and recommendations to concerned parties. AML/CFT supervision via compliance examinations at banks and other reporting entities to ensure proper implementation of prevailing regulations is also among its tasks. The SIC is managed by the Governor Mr. Riad Salamé and assisted by the president of the Banking Control Commission, a professional appointed by the Council of Ministers and the judge appointed to the Higher Banking Commission.

=== Higher Banking Commission ===
The Higher Banking Commission was established at Banque du Liban in 1967, pursuant to Article 10 of Law No 28/67. It is composed of:

- The Governor of the Banque du Liban, as Chairman
- A vice-governor selected by the Central Council of the Banque du Liban
- The Director General of the Ministry of Finance
- A high-ranking judge, with a ten-year experience at least, approved by the Higher Judicial Council and appointed by decree;
- A member of the Banking Control Commission, nominated by the Association of Banks in Lebanon
- The chairman of the National Deposit Guarantee Institution (NDGI)

== Investment policy for startups ==
On August 22nd of 2013, The Central Bank of Lebanon issued a new investment policy called "Circular No. 331". This aimed to assist Lebanon's knowledge economy by providing support to the thriving startup ecosystem. With this initiative, the Central Bank wishes to increase the country's GDP, decrease unemployment and position Lebanon as the tech hub of the Middle East.

The outcomes of the circular have however fallen short of the expectations. Many Lebanon's observers pointed that the initiative lacked transparency: There has been no clear indication of the number of start-up funded, jobs created and money spent. The initiative was unable to overcome a major hurdle of the Lebanese economy: banks' extremely risk-averse and conservative attitude towards investment.

Circular No. 331 encourages commercial banks to invest in start-ups. The BdL will guarantee up to 75% of the value of these commercial bank investments in the capital of start-ups that meet the determined criteria. Some domestic start-ups working in the knowledge economy sector that are affiliated with the BdL include:

- MEVP – A Middle East-focused venture capital firm that invests in the early and growth stages of innovative companies run by talented entrepreneurs Walid Hanna and Walid Mansour primarily, but not exclusively, in the Middle East Region with a focus on the GCC and Levant markets.
- Berytech – A Lebanese tech focused business development center, has recently announced a $50 million investment fund, the Berytech Fund II. Berytech incubator is led by chairman Maroun Chammas.
- Leap Ventures – A growth stage Venture Capital firm in the Middle East and North Africa, based out of Beirut and Dubai. Leap Ventures looks to make investments in innovation & technology startups from the MENA region that have reached the series B stage: startups that have established a market presence and are seeking to dramatically accelerate their global market penetration and commercialization. Leap Ventures is led by founding partners Henri Asselly and Hala Fadel.
- Presella – An event management technology startup with the primary focus on a paperless e-ticketing platform for the MENA region. The platform is supported by a Last minute ticket mobile application and an in-event door management application. APPS Currently in closed Beta in Dubai & Beirut.
- My ME – A socially-responsible, personal travel planning service that helps guests design and implement trips to the Middle East and the Eastern Mediterranean based on their own travel dates, travel preferences, and personal style. My Middle East - prepares personalized travel plans to Egypt, Lebanon, Syria, Turkey, and Croatia (and soon other destinations).
- Kashida – The first registered company in the world to transform the Arabic letterform into evocative, functional 3D design pieces. They offer contemporary home décor accents, furniture, corporate gifts and event souvenirs to create a more personalized living/work space for our B2B and B2C clients.
- Egnyt Technology incubator – Managed by Samir Chreim. Egnyt recently opened 2,500-sqft business incubator in Beirut that is meant for enterprises focusing on technology.

According to the circular, the total participation of any bank in start-ups may not exceed 3% of the bank's capital, provided the participation of any bank in a single start-up does not exceed 10% of the aforementioned 3%. Thus, commercial banks must invest in at least 10 start-ups if they want to benefit from all the facilities provided to them by BDL.

The startup accelerator UK Lebanon Tech Hub is a startup initiative between Banque du Liban and the UK government.

== Allegations of misconduct ==
Riad Salameh, the bank's chairman for 30 years, has been accused of corruption, money laundering and running the largest Ponzi scheme in history during his term; he was additionally labeled "the world's worst central banker". He is currently under sanctions by Canada, the United Kingdom and the United States. Wassim Mansouri stepped up as interim governor of the Banque du Liban after Lebanon failed to name a successor to Salameh, whose term finished in July 2023. Salameh, who

In November 2020, The Wall Street Journal reported that the United States and other Western countries demanded a forensic audit of the Banque du Liban (BDL), as it was accused of money laundering, corruption and links to Hezbollah.

In 2023, it was reported that the forensic audit—which had been a key demand of the international community and the International Monetary Fund—revealed years of misconduct by the bank's former governor Riad Salameh and $111 million in "illegitimate commissions". The audit covered the 2015–2020 period.

Among other things, the audit report details BDL's practice of financial engineering, which, starting in 2015, it used to allow local banks to attract dollar deposits from abroad and then have the lenders deposit the dollars at BDL. The local lenders were given interest rates higher than international market rates in return. According to the audit, the central bank disguised losses equal to $76 billion through the engineering. Salameh said the bank's central council had found financial engineering to be the "best response to a deteriorating balance of payment" and that he had not "intervened" in decision-making on engineering. BDL has said the operations are legal.

On August 10, 2023, the United States, the United Kingdom, and Canada imposed sanctions on Salameh and a handful of his close relatives and associates due to corruption allegations. Meanwhile, France, Germany, and Luxembourg were investigating Salameh and several close associates over alleged financial crimes, including illicit enrichment and money laundering of $330 million. France and Germany issued Interpol notices for Salameh in May 2023; however, Lebanon does not hand over its citizens to foreign countries.

== Al-Qard Al-Hassan banning ==
On July 14, 2025 it was reported that Banque du Liban, has issued a circular prohibiting all licensed financial institutions from engaging in any direct or indirect dealings with Al‑Qard Al‑Hassan, Hezbollah’s Iran-backed financial arm. Though Al‑Qard Al‑Hassan positions itself as a charitable microfinance institution offering interest‑free loans, it has long been under U.S. sanctions for acting as a covert conduit for Hezbollah to channel funds globally . The decision follows escalating international pressure and past Israeli strikes on its branches, reinforcing scrutiny over Hezbollah’s role in Lebanon’s financial system.

== See also ==
- Banque Libano-Française S.A.L.
- Economy of Lebanon
- FFA Private Bank
- Lebanese Pound
- Nasser Saidi, First Vice-Governor, 1993–1998 and 1998–2003
- List of banks in Lebanon
- List of central banks
