= List of companies of Lebanon =

Location of Lebanon

Lebanon is a sovereign state in Western Asia. It is bordered by Syria to the north and east and Israel to the south, while Cyprus is west across the Mediterranean Sea. Lebanon's economy follows a laissez-faire model. Most of the economy is dollarized, and the country has no restrictions on the movement of capital across its borders. The Lebanese government's intervention in foreign trade is minimal.

== Notable firms ==
This list includes notable companies with primary headquarters located in the country. The industry and sector follow the Industry Classification Benchmark taxonomy. Organizations which have ceased operations are included and noted as defunct.

Notable companies Status: P=Private, S=State; A=Active, D=Defunct
Name	Industry	Sector	Headquarters	Founded	Notes	Status	
Al Jadeed	Consumer services	Broadcasting & entertainment	Beirut	1991	Television broadcaster	P	A
Alrifai	Consumer services	Specialty retailers	Beirut	1948	Nut retailer	P	A
Bank Audi	Financials	Banks	Beirut	1830	Public bank	P	A
Bank of Beirut	Financials	Banks	Beirut	1963	Commercial bank	P	A
Banque du Liban	Financials	Banks	Beirut	1963	Central bank	S	A
Banque Zilkha	Financials	Banks	Beirut	1946	Defunct, merged into Société Bancaire du Liban in 1958	P	D
Beirut International Center Production (BIC)	Consumer services	Broadcasting & entertainment	Beirut	2007	Media production	P	A
Beirut Stock Exchange	Financials	Investment services	Beirut	1920	Primary exchange	S	A
Berytos Airlines	Consumer services	Airlines	Hazmiyeh	2003	Airline, defunct 2008	P	D
Byblos Bank	Financials	Banks	Beirut	1963	Banking and financial services	P	A
Château Musar	Consumer goods	Distillers & vintners	Ghazir	1930	Winery	P	A
Eastline Marketing	Technology	Internet	Mansourieh	2006	Online marketing	P	A
Électricité du Liban	Utilities	Conventional electricity	Beirut	1964	Power	P	A
Farra Design Center	Consumer services	Specialty retailers	Beirut	1939	Retail store	P	A
FFA Private Bank	Financials	Banks	Beirut	1994	Financial brokerage and bank	P	A
Forward Music	Consumer services	Broadcasting & entertainment	Beirut	2001	Record label	P	A
Future News	Consumer services	Broadcasting & entertainment	Beirut	2007	News channel	P	A
Future Television	Consumer services	Broadcasting & entertainment	Beirut	1993	Television	P	A
Intra Bank	Financials	Banks	Beirut	1951	Defunct 1966	P	D
IXSIR wine	Consumer goods	Distillers & vintners	Batroun	2008	Winery	P	A
LBC Nagham	Consumer services	Broadcasting & entertainment	Beirut	2003	Music television	P	A
Lebanese Broadcasting Corporation International	Consumer services	Broadcasting & entertainment	Beirut	1985	Broadcasting	P	A
Lebanese International Airways	Consumer services	Airlines	Beirut	1956	Airline, defunct 1969	P	D
Massaya	Consumer goods	Distillers & vintners	Beqaa Valley	1970	Winery and arak distillery	P	A
Middle East Airlines	Consumer services	Airlines	Beirut	1945	Airline	S	A
Murr Television	Consumer services	Broadcasting & entertainment	Beirut	1991	Television	P	A
National Broadcasting Network (Lebanon)	Consumer services	Broadcasting & entertainment	Beirut	1996	Television	P	A
Neelwafurat.com	Consumer services	Broadline retailers	Beirut	1998	Online retailer	P	A
OTV	Consumer services	Broadcasting & entertainment	Beirut	2007	Television	P	A
PSLab	Industrials	Building Materials & Fixtures	Beirut	2004	Interior design and lighting	P	A
Racti Art Production & Distribution	Consumer services	Broadcasting & entertainment	Beirut	1998	Media dubbing/translation	P	A
SABIS	Consumer services	Education services	Choueifat	1886	Education management, school network	P	A
Société Bancaire du Liban	Financials	Banks	Beirut	1958	Defunct 2002	P	D
Tabbah	Consumer goods	Clothing & accessories	Beirut	1862	Jewelry, retail	P	A
Zaatar w Zeit	Consumer services	Restaurants & bars	Zouk Mosbeh	1999	Restaurant chain	P	A

Marina Towers, Beirut

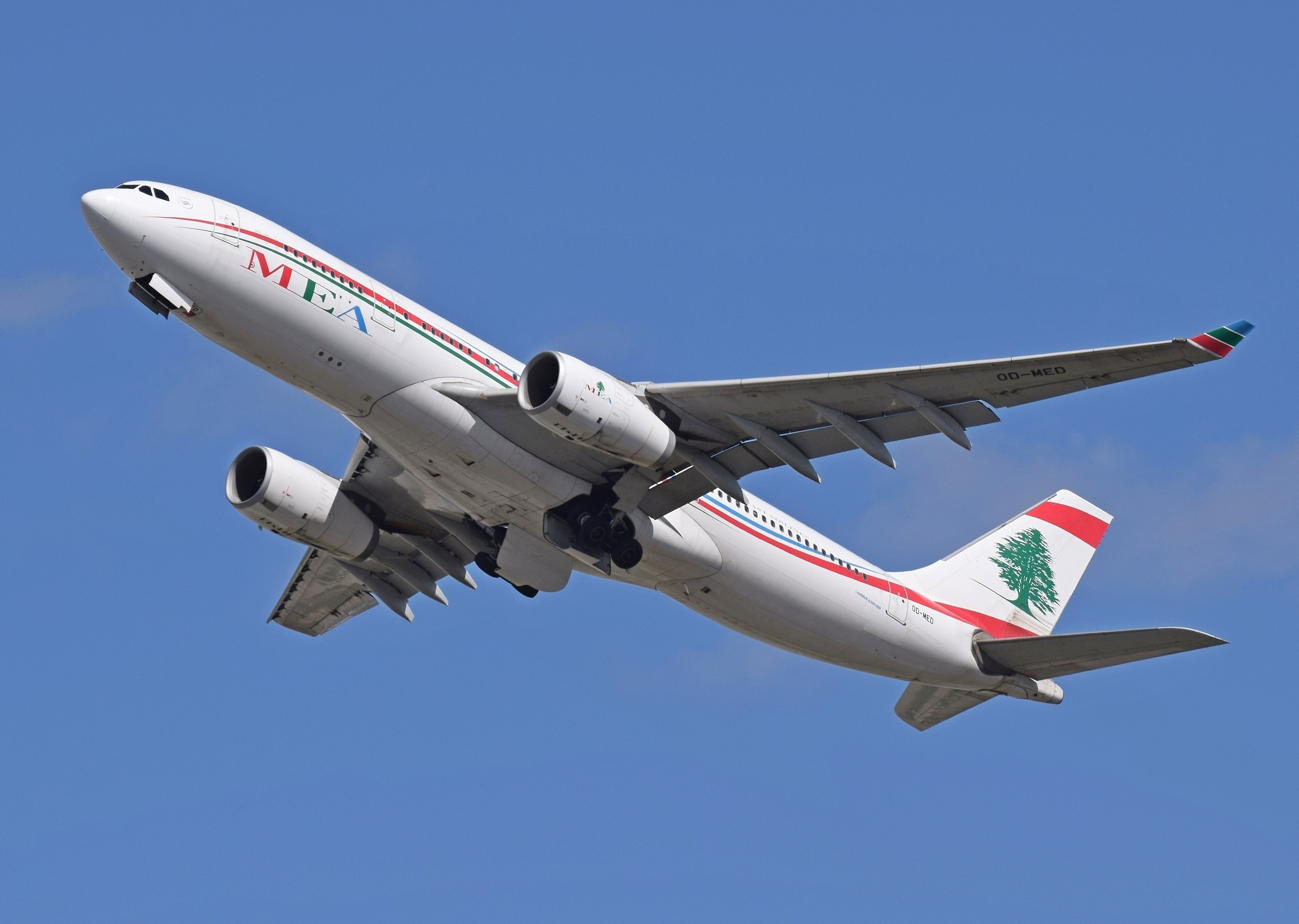
A Middle East Airlines Airbus A330-200.

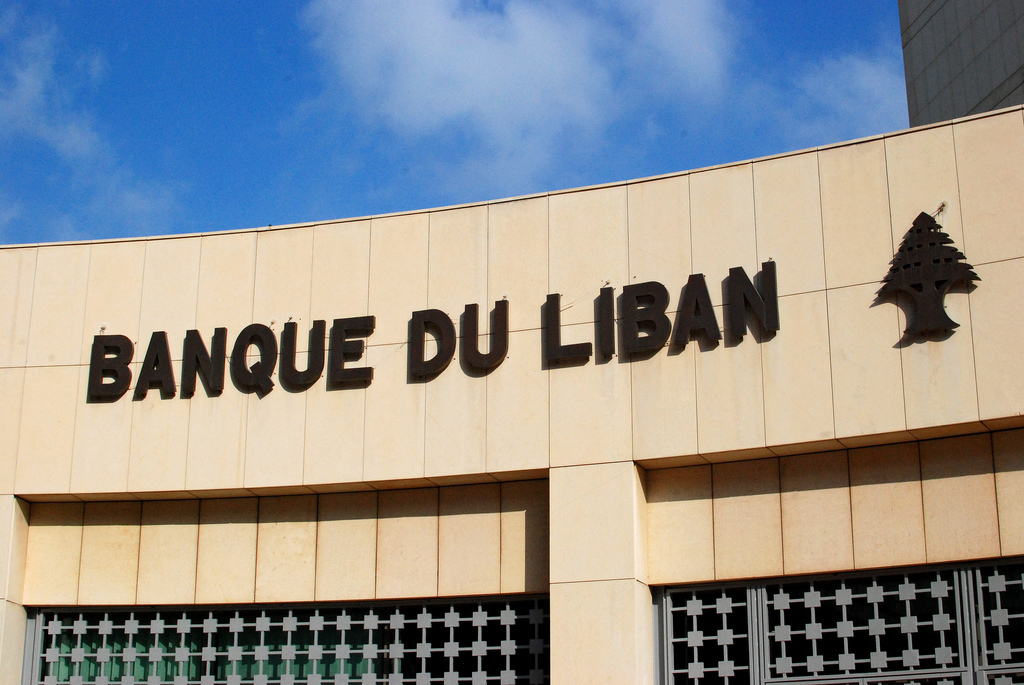
Headquarters of the Banque du Liban.

== See also ==
- List of companies listed on the Beirut Stock Exchange
