= List of edible seeds =

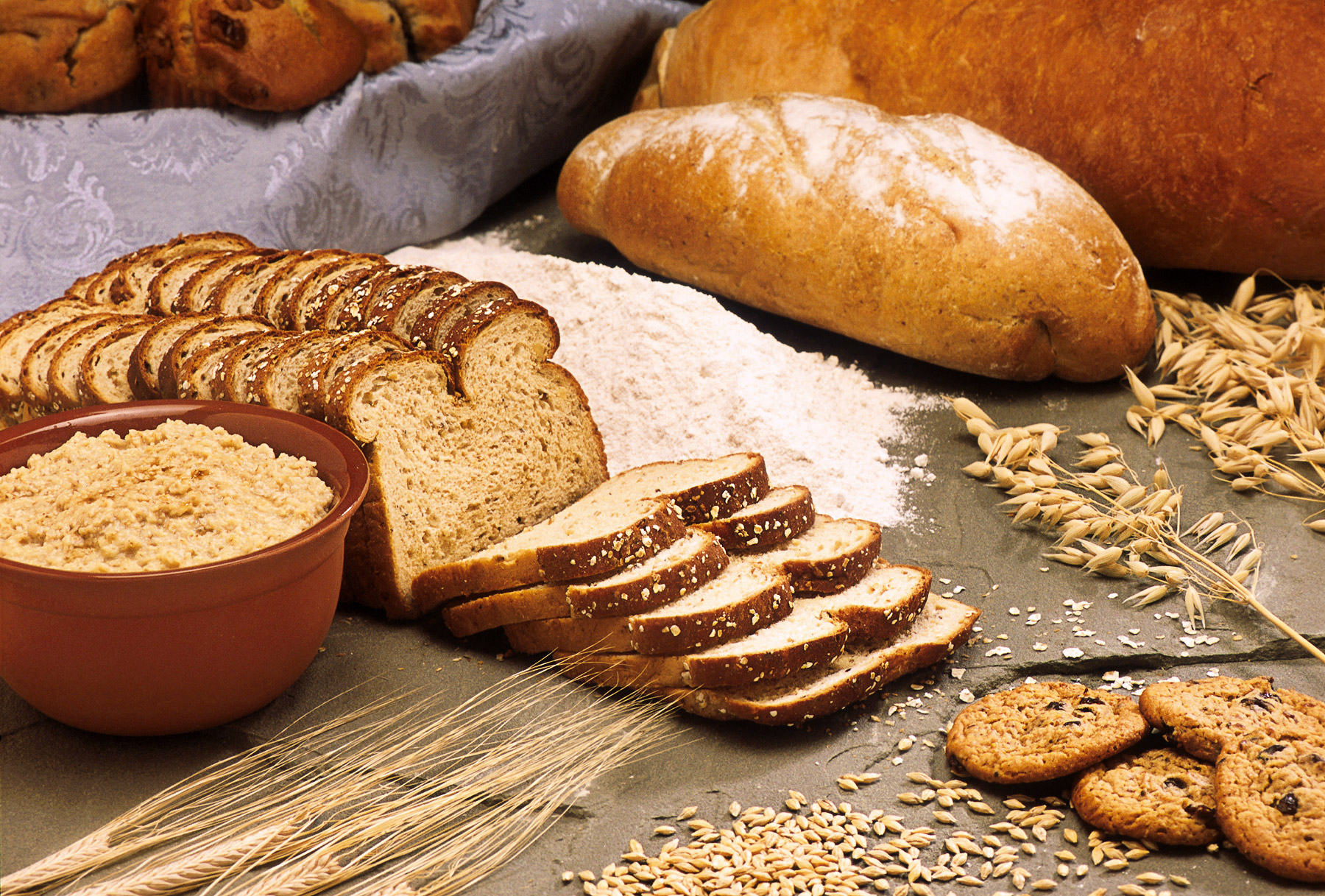
Cereals are edible seeds that are used to create many different food products.

An edible seed (Note: Variously referred to as a bean, berry, grain, groat, kernel, nut, or pulse, among other names, depending on the plant from which it derives.) is a seed that is suitable for human consumption. Of the six major plant parts, (Note: Seed, root, stem, leaf, flower, and fruit.) seeds are the dominant source of human calories and protein. A wide variety of plant species provide edible seeds; most are angiosperms, while a few are gymnosperms. As a global food source, the most important edible seeds by weight are cereals, followed by legumes, nuts, and spices.

Grain crops (cereals and millets) and legumes correspond with the botanical families Poaceae and Fabaceae, respectively, while nuts, pseudocereals, and other seeds form polyphylic groups based on their culinary roles.

== Grains ==
Grains are the edible seed of a plants in the grass family Poaceae. Grains come in two varieties: the larger grains produced by drought-sensitive crops are called cereals and the smaller drought-resistant varieties are millets. Grains can be consumed in a variety of ways, all of which require husking and cooking, including whole, rolled, puffed, or ground into flour. Many cereals are present or past staple foods, providing a large fraction of the calories in the places in which they are eaten. Today, cereals provide almost half of all calories consumed in the world.

Cereals
Family	Tribe	Genus	Species	Seed name(s)	Photo
Poaceae	Andropogoneae	Sorghum	S. bicolor	sorghum	
Poaceae	Andropogoneae	Themeda	T. triandra	kangaroo grass, red oat grass	
Poaceae	Andropogoneae	Zea	Z. mays	maize, corn, corn kernel	
Poaceae	Cynodonteae	Astrebla	A. pectinata	barley Mitchell	
Poaceae	Cynodonteae	Eleusine	E. coracana	finger millet	
Poaceae	Eragrostideae	Eragrostis	E. eriopoda	woollybutt grass	
Poaceae	Eragrostideae	Eragrostis	E. tef	teff	
Poaceae	Oryzeae	Oryza	O. sativa	Asian rice	
Poaceae	Oryzeae	Oryza	O. glaberrima	African rice	
Poaceae	Oryzeae	Zizania	Z. palustris	wild rice	
Poaceae	Paniceae	Cenchrus	C. americanus	pearl millet	
Poaceae	Paniceae	Digitaria	D. iburua	black fonio	
Poaceae	Paniceae	Digitaria	D. exilis	white fonio	
Poaceae	Paniceae	Panicum	P. australiense	bunch panic	
Poaceae	Paniceae	Panicum	P. decompositum	native millet	
Poaceae	Paniceae	Panicum	P. effusum	hairy panic	
Poaceae	Paniceae	Panicum	P. miliaceum	proso millet	
Poaceae	Paniceae	Panicum	P. sumatrense	little millet	
Poaceae	Paniceae	Setaria	S. italica	foxtail millet	
Poaceae	Paniceae	Urochloa	U. piligera	wattle signalgrass	
Poaceae	Poeae	Avena	A. sativa	oat, oat groat	
Poaceae	Triticeae	Hordeum	H. vulgare	barley, barley groat	
Poaceae	Triticeae	Secale	S. cereale	rye, rye berry	
Poaceae	Triticeae	× Triticosecale		triticale	
Poaceae	Triticeae	Triticum	T. aestivum (including subsp. spelta)	wheat, common wheat, bread wheat, wheat berry, spelt, spelt wheat	
Poaceae	Triticeae	Triticum	T. monococcum	einkorn	
Poaceae	Triticeae	Triticum	T. turgidum (including subsp. dicoccum, durum and turanicum)	emmer, kamut, durum, durum wheat	
Poaceae	Triticeae	Thinopyrum	T. intermedium	Kernza, intermediate wheatgrass	

=== Pseudocereals ===
A pseudocereal, or pseudocereal grain, is the edible seed of a pseudocereal, one of a polyphyletic group of plants that produce seeds that resemble those of cereals. Pseudocereals are used in many of the same ways as cereals.

Pseudocereals
Family	Genus	Species	Seed name(s)	Photo
Amaranthaceae	Amaranthus		amaranth, amaranth grain	
Amaranthaceae	Chenopodium	C. berlandieri	pitseed goosefoot	
Amaranthaceae	Chenopodium	C. pallidicaule	kañiwa	
Amaranthaceae	Chenopodium	C. quinoa	quinoa	
Capparaceae	Boscia	B. senegalensis	hanza	
Lamiaceae	Salvia	S. hispanica	chia, chia seed	
Linaceae	Linum	L. usitatissimum	flax, flaxseed, linseed	
Moraceae	Brosimum	B. alicastrum	breadnut	
Pedaliaceae	Sesamum	S. indicum	sesame, sesame seed	
Polygonaceae	Fagopyrum	F. esculentum	buckwheat, buckwheat groat	

== Legumes ==
A legume, or pulse, is the edible seed of a legume, a plant in the family Fabaceae. Legumes can be divided into grams, which do not split, and dals, which split.

Legumes
Family	Tribe	Genus	Species	Seed name(s)	Photo
Fabaceae	Cicereae	Cicer	C. arietinum	chickpea, garbanzo bean, gram	
Fabaceae	Dalbergieae	Arachis	A. hypogaea	peanut (groundnut)	
Fabaceae	Fabeae	Lathyrus	L. oleraceus	pea (Note: Cultivars include the snap pea and snow pea (both fruits).)	
Fabaceae	Fabeae	Vicia	V. faba	fava bean, broad bean	
Fabaceae	Fabeae	Vicia	V. lens	lentil	
Fabaceae	Millettieae	Millettia	M. pinnata	Indian beechnut	
Fabaceae	Phaseoleae	Cajanus	C. cajan	pigeon pea	
Fabaceae	Phaseoleae	Glycine	G. max	soybean	
Fabaceae	Phaseoleae	Phaseolus	P. coccineus	runner bean	
Fabaceae	Phaseoleae	Phaseolus	P. lunatus	lima bean	
Fabaceae	Phaseoleae	Phaseolus	P. vulgaris	common bean (Note: Cultivars include the black bean, green bean (fruit), kidney bean, navy bean, and pinto bean.)	
Fabaceae	Phaseoleae	Vigna	V.aconitifolia	moth bean	
Fabaceae	Phaseoleae	Vigna	V. angularis	adzuki bean	
Fabaceae	Phaseoleae	Vigna	V. mungo	black gram	
Fabaceae	Phaseoleae	Vigna	V. radiata	mung bean, green gram	
Fabaceae	Phaseoleae	Vigna	V. subterranea	Bambara groundnut	
Fabaceae	Phaseoleae	Vigna	V. unguiculata	cowpea	

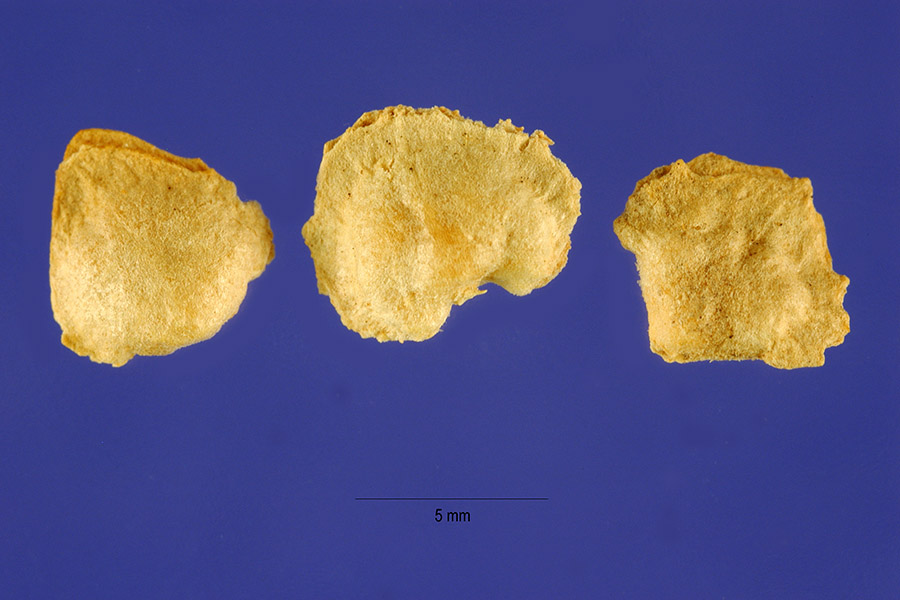
Seeds of Atriplex nummularia, Australia

Although some beans can be consumed raw, some need to be heated before consumption. In certain cultures, beans that require heating are initially prepared as a seed cake. Beans that need heating include:

- Acacia species (wattleseed), such as mulga (Acacia aneura), Halls Creek wattle (A. cowleana), southern ironwood (A. estrophiolata), umbrella bush (A. ligulata), Murray's wattle (A. murrayana), curara (A. tetragonophylla), witchetty bush (A. kempeana), wiry wattle (A. coriacea), mallee golden wattle (A. notabilis), ranji bush (A. pyrifolia), bardi bush (A. victoriae), coastal wattle (A. sophorae), shoestring acacia (A. stenophylla), and pindan wattle (A. tumida).
- Atriplex nummularia – old man saltbush
- Brachychiton species, such as kurrajong (Brachychiton populneus), northern kurrajong (B. diversifolius), desert kurrajong (B. gregorii), and red-flowered kurrajong (B. paradoxus).
- Bruguiera gymnorhiza – black mangrove
- Calandrinia balonensis – parakeelya
- Canarium australianum – mango bark
- Canavalia rosea – beach bean
- Entada phaseoloides – St. Thomas bean
- Marsilea drummondii – nardoo
- Vincetoxicum lineare – purple pentatrope

== Nuts ==
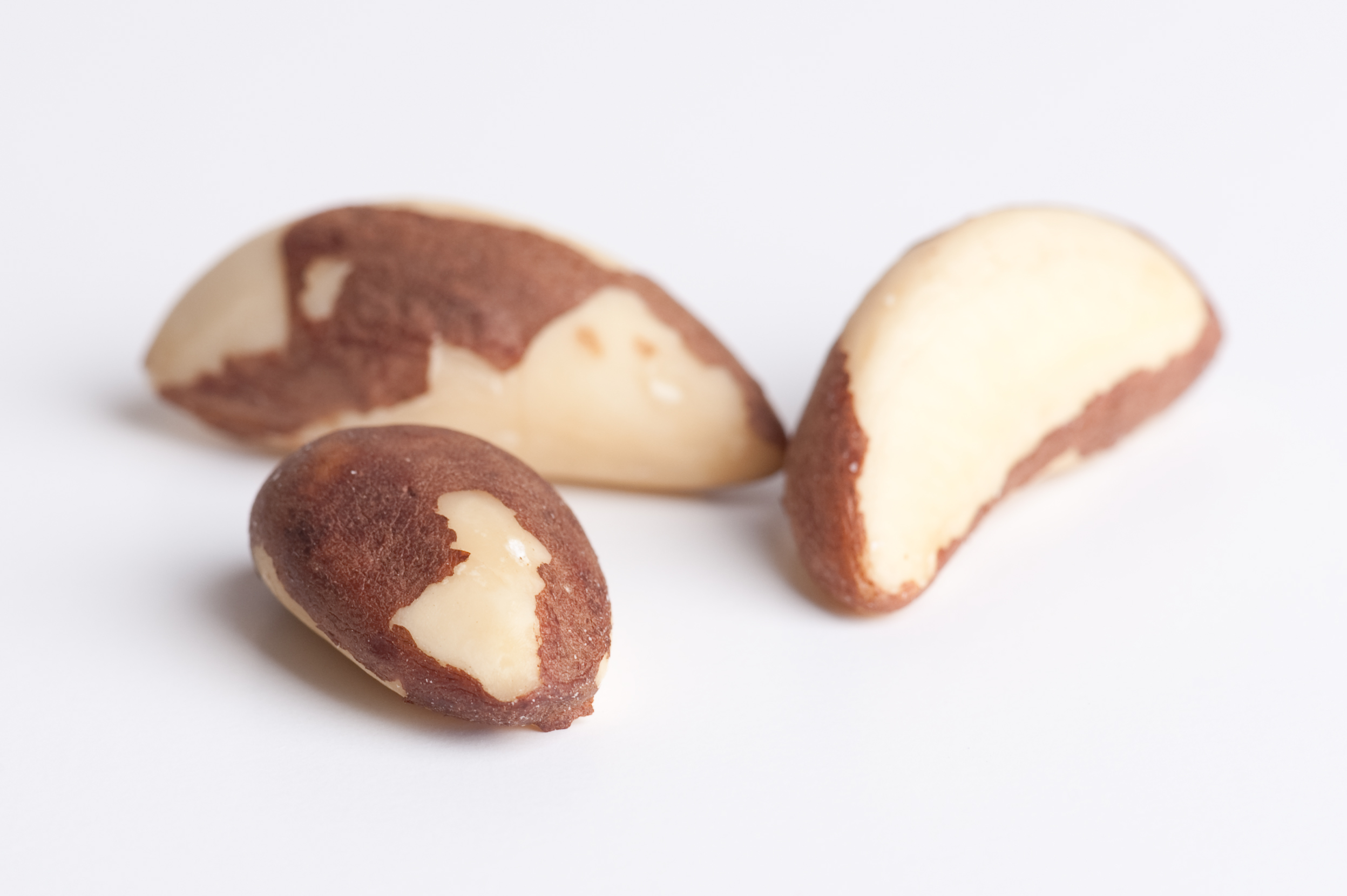
Brazil nuts

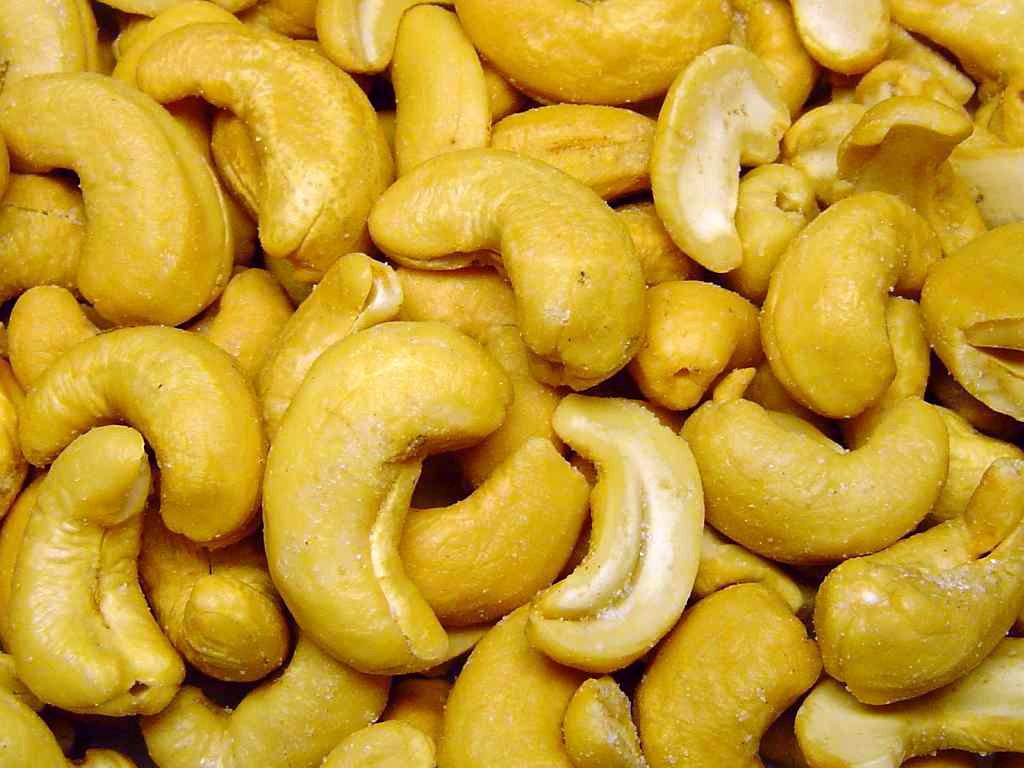
Roasted and salted cashew nuts

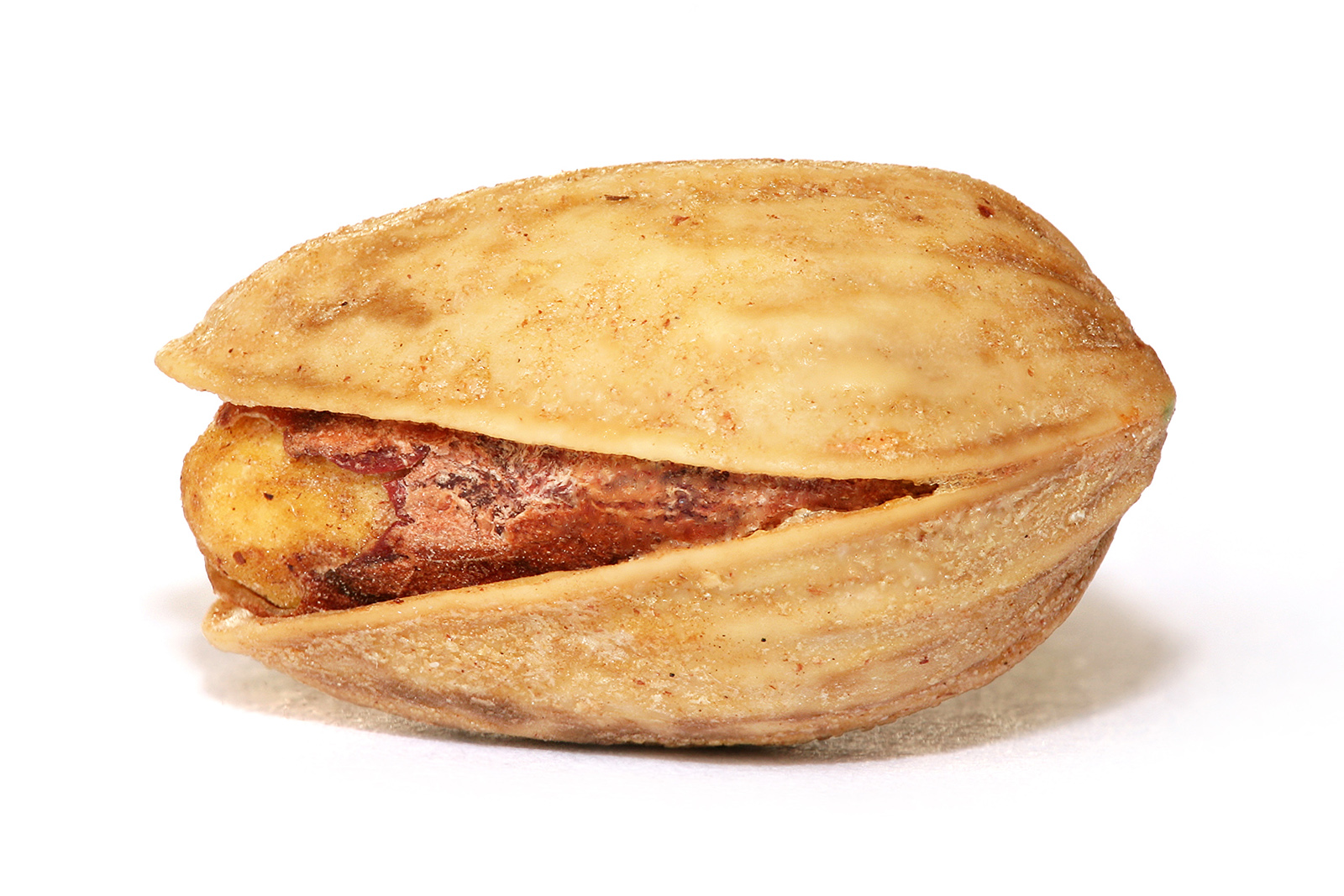
Roasted pistachio

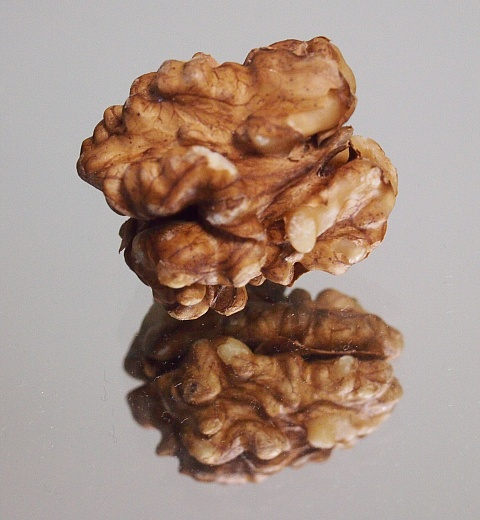
A whole walnut kernel

According to the botanical definition, nuts are a particular kind of fruit. Chestnuts, hazelnuts, and acorns are examples of nuts under this definition. In culinary terms, however, the term is used more broadly to include fruits that are not botanically qualified as nuts, but that have a similar appearance and culinary role. Examples of culinary nuts include almonds and cashews.

- Acorn
- Almond
- Beech
- Brazil nut
- Candlenut
- Cashew
- Chestnuts, including:
  - Chinese chestnut
  - Japanese chestnut
  - Sweet chestnut
- Chilean hazel
- Coconut
- Egusi and other squash and melon seeds, including:
  - Colocynth
  - Malabar gourd
  - Pepita
  - Ugu
- Guinea peanut
- Hazelnuts, including:
  - Filbert
- Hickory, including:
  - Pecan
  - Shagbark hickory
- Kola nut
- Macadamia
- Malabar almond
- Malabar chestnut
- Mamoncillo
- Mongongo
- Ogbono
- Paradise nut
- Pili
- Pistachio
- Shea nut
- Walnuts, including:
  - Black walnut

=== Nut-like gymnosperm seeds ===
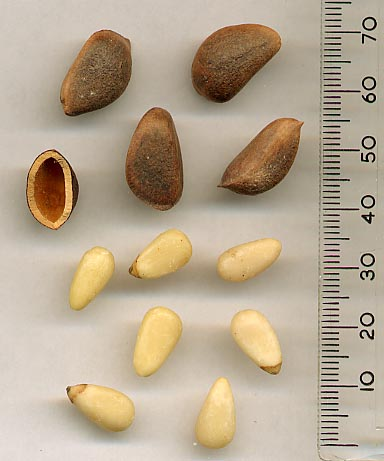
Pine nuts

Edible gymnosperm seeds that resembles nuts include:

- Ginkgo
- Gnetum
- Juniper
- Monkey-puzzle
- Pine nuts, including
  - Pinhão
  - Chilgoza pine
  - Korean pine
  - Mexican pinyon
  - Piñon pine
  - Single-leaf pinyon
  - Stone pine
- Podocarps

== Spices ==
- Anise
- Annatto
- Black pepper
- Caraway
- Cardamom
- Celery seed
- Coriander
- Cumin
- Fenugreek
- Nigella
- Nutmeg
- Mustard seed
- Poppy seed
- Sesame
- Star anise
- Sumac
- Vanilla

== As part of fruit ==
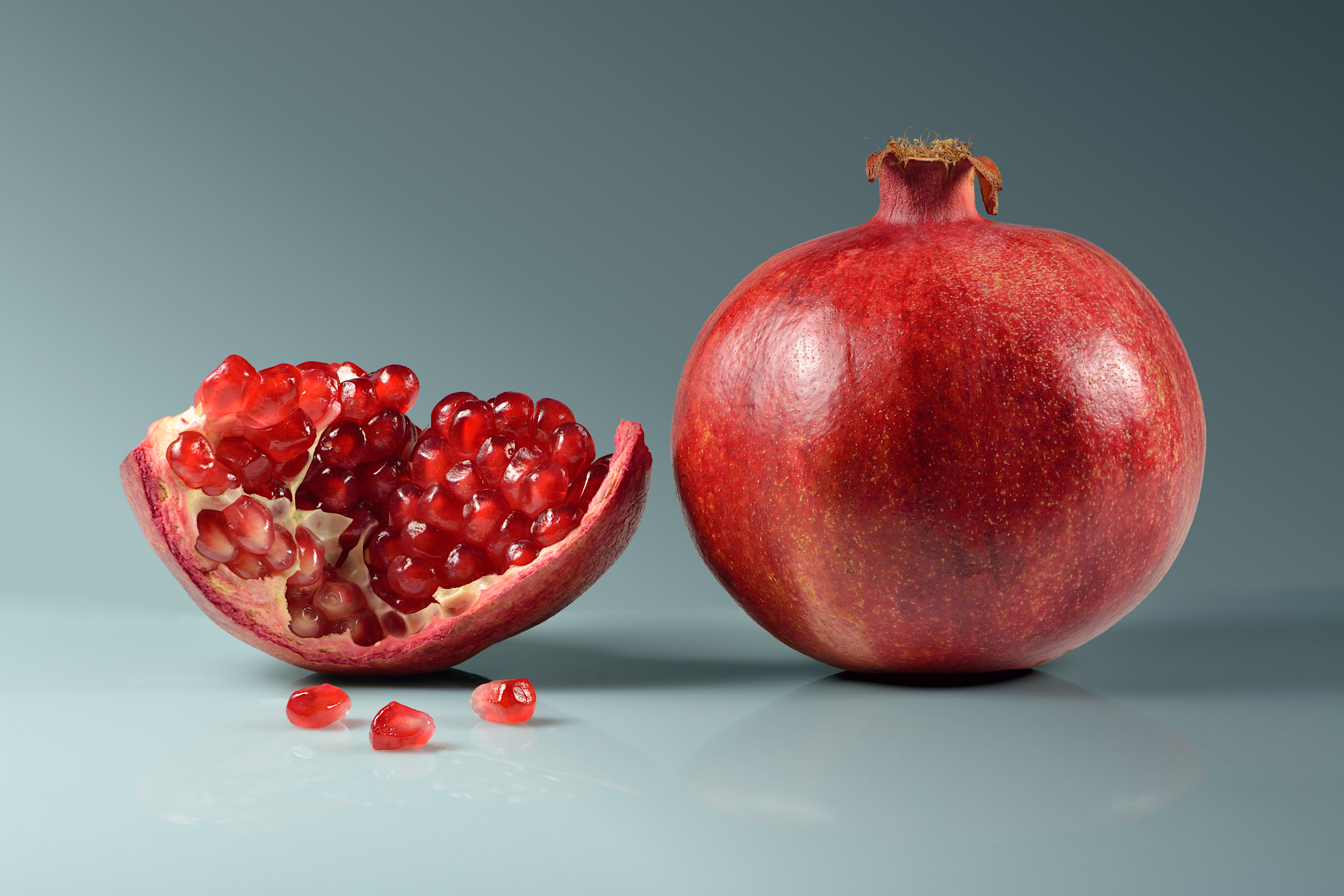
Pomegranate has edible seeds.

- Most berries, such as
  - Blackberry
  - Blueberry
  - Mulberry
  - Raspberry
  - Strawberry
- Some culinary vegetables, such as
  - Tomato
  - Chili pepper and bell pepper
  - Cucumber
  - Zucchini
- Guava
- Kiwifruit
- Passion fruit
- Pitaya
- Pomegranate
- Watermelon

== Other ==
Other edible seeds that do not neatly fit into the above categories include:

- Cempedak
- Cocoa bean
- Coffee bean
- Durian
- Fox nut
- Hemp seed
- Jackfruit
- Lotus seed
- Osage orange seed
- Papaya seed
- Sunflower seed
- Pumpkin seed

== See also ==
- Eastern Agricultural Complex
- List of almond dishes
- List of dried foods
- List of food origins
- List of foods
- List of legume dishes
- List of maize dishes
- List of rice dishes
- List of vegetable oils
- List of seed-based snacks
- Oilseeds
