= Nut (food) =

Foods called nuts, which may be true nuts or seeds, drupes or legumes

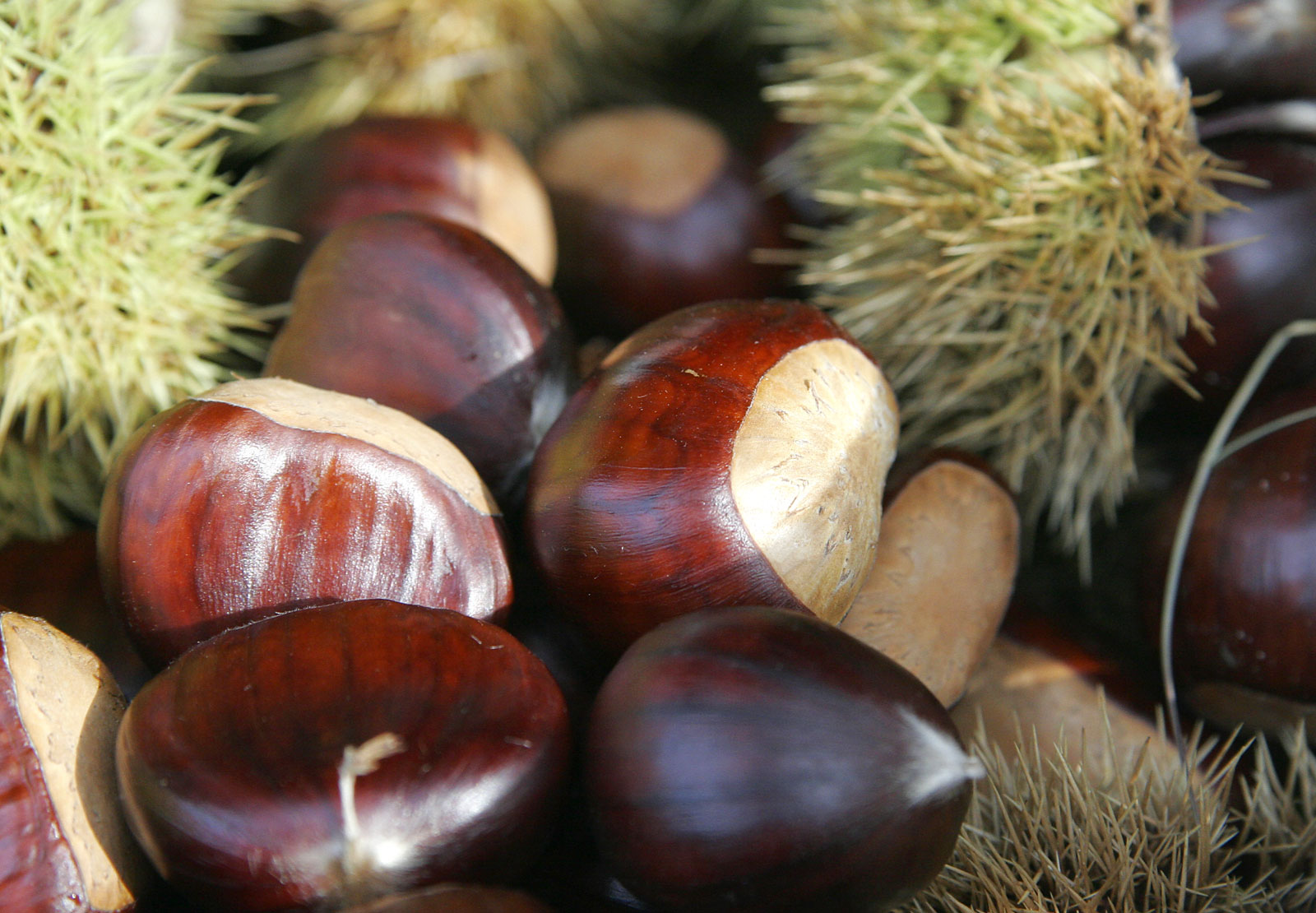
Chestnuts are both botanical and culinary nuts.

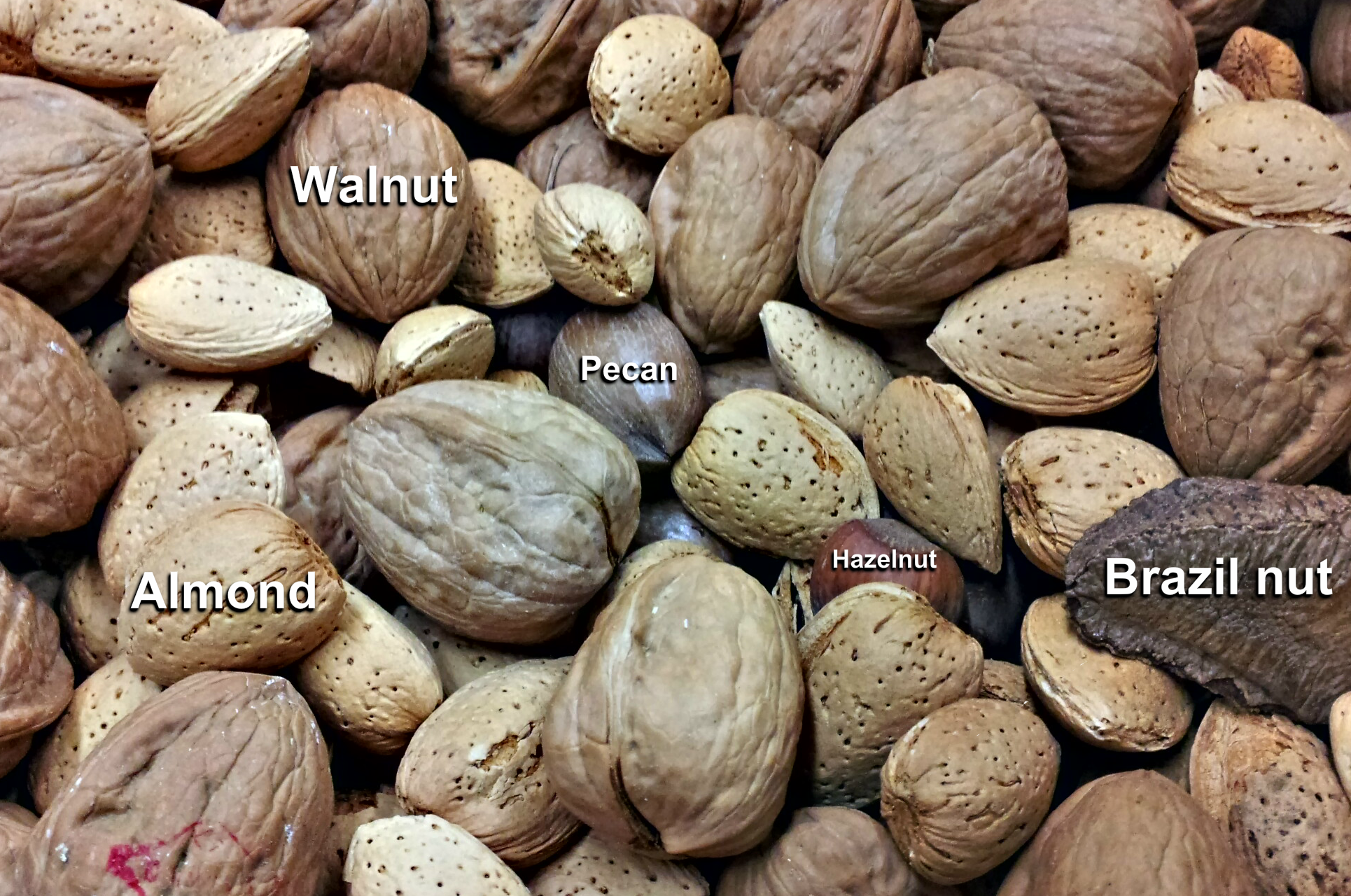
Some common "culinary nuts": hazelnuts, which are also botanical nuts; Brazil nuts, which are not botanical nuts, but rather the seeds of a capsule; and walnuts, pecans, and almonds (which are not botanical nuts, but rather the seeds of drupes)

A nut is a fruit consisting of a hard or tough nutshell protecting a kernel that usually is edible. In general usage and in a culinary sense, many dry seeds are called nuts. In a botanical context, "nut" implies that the shell does not open to release the seed (indehiscent).

Most seeds come from fruits that naturally free themselves from the shell, but this is not the case in nuts such as hazelnuts, chestnuts, and acorns, which have hard shell walls and originate from a compound ovary. The general and original use of the term is less restrictive, and many nuts (in the culinary sense), such as almonds, pistachios, and Brazil nuts, are not 'nuts' in a botanical sense. Common use of the term 'nut' often refers to any hard-walled, edible kernel. Nuts are an energy-dense and nutrient-rich food source.

== Definition ==
Botanically, a nut is a fruit with a woody pericarp developing from a syncarpous gynoecium. True nuts include, for example, chestnut, hazelnut, and filbert. Culinarily, the term 'nut' is used much more widely, and includes examples of drupes (such as pecans and almonds) or seeds (such as pine nuts and peanuts).

Also widely known as nuts are dry drupes, which include pecans, almonds, macadamia (Macadamia integrifolia), candlenut (Aleurites moluccanus), and the water caltrop (Trapa bicornis). A drupe is an indehiscent fruit that has an outer fleshy part consisting of the exocarp, or skin, and mesocarp, or flesh, which surround a single pit or stone, the endocarp with a seed (kernel) inside. In a dry drupe, the outer parts dry up and the remaining husk is part of the ovary wall or pericarp, and the hard inner wall surrounding the seed represents the inner part of the pericarp.

Walnuts and hickories (Juglandaceae) have fruits that are difficult to classify. They are considered to be nuts under some definitions, but are also referred to as drupaceous nuts.

In common use, a "tree nut" is, as the name implies, any nut coming from a tree. This use most often comes up regarding food allergies; a person may be allergic specifically to peanuts (which are not tree nuts but legumes), whereas others may be allergic to the wider range of nuts that grow on trees.

== Production ==
Cost comparison of legumes, nuts and seeds compared to other food groups, 2021

In the 21st century, approximately a dozen species constitute most of the worldwide production of nuts, shown in the table below for major commercial nuts.

Culinary nuts
Name	Image	Origin	Description	Production
Almond (Prunus dulcis)	Almonds in shell, shell cracked open, shelled and blanched	Originated in Iran and the surrounding area.	The fruit is a drupe, consisting of an outer hull and a hard shell, the endocarp, containing a single seed. Almonds are sold shelled or unshelled. Blanched almonds are almonds with the shells removed that have been treated with hot water to soften the seed coat, which is then removed.	World production of unshelled almonds in 2019 was 3.5 million tonnes, and the largest producing countries were the United States, Spain, Iran, Turkey, and Morocco.
Brazil nut (Bertholletia excelsa)	Brazil nut fruit containing nuts	Native to tropical South America where the nuts are gathered from forest trees growing in the wild.	The nuts are hard-shelled seeds borne in a hard, woody capsule.	In 2019, global production of Brazil nuts was 78,000 tonnes, most of which were harvested from the Amazon rainforest of Brazil and Bolivia.
Cashew (Anacardium occidentale)	Ripe cashew fruits	Originated in northeastern Brazil and widely grown in the tropics.	The fruit is a thick-shelled, seed-bearing drupe borne at the apex of a fleshy stalk known as a cashew apple.	World production in 2019 of cashew nuts with shells was around 4 million tonnes, with Côte d'Ivoire and India being the main producing countries.
Chestnut (Castanea spp.)	Chestnuts in spiny fruit	Native to temperate regions of the Northern Hemisphere, and was at one time a staple crop in some regions.	It is a true nut and grows in a spiny, cup-shaped involucre formed from the calyx.	World production in 2019 was 2.4 million tonnes, and the main producing countries were China, Turkey, South Korea, Portugal, Italy, Greece, and Spain.
Coconut (Cocos nucifera)	Split coconut in husk	Grown throughout the tropics.	The fruit is a dry drupe, with both the coconut flesh and the coconut water developing from the endosperm, being surrounded by the fibrous husk.	Has the largest world production of any nuts, with a global figure of 62.51 million tonnes in 2019, with Indonesia, the Philippines and India being the largest producers.
Hazelnut (Corylus avellana)	Whole hazelnuts and kernels	Native to temperate regions of the Northern Hemisphere.	The fruit is a true nut and grows in a leafy or tubular involucre formed from the calyx.	In 2019, world production of hazelnuts in shells was 1.1 million tonnes, predominantly grown in Turkey, with other notable producing countries being Italy, Azerbaijan, the United States, Chile, and China.
Macadamia (Macadamia spp.)	Whole macadamia nut and roasted kernel	Indigenous to Australia and an important food for the Aboriginal peoples before Europeans arrived.	The fruit is a hard, woody, globose follicle with a pointed apex, containing one or two seeds.	Total world production in 2018 was 200,000 tonnes, South Africa being the largest producer, followed by Australia and Kenya.
Peanut (Arachis hypogaea)	Peanuts in shell, shell cracked open, shelled, peeled	Originated in South America and may have been in cultivation for 10,000 years. Widely grown in the tropics.	The plant is a legume and the fruit is a papery pod containing one or more nut-like seeds.	World production in 2019 was 49 million tonnes, China is the largest producing country, followed by India, Nigeria, Sudan, and the United States.
Pecan (Carya illinoinensis)	Whole pecans and kernels	Native to the southern United States and northern Mexico.	The fruit is a pseudo-drupe with a green, semi-fleshy husk.	Two to three million tonnes are harvested annually; in the United States, most pecans are produced in Georgia, New Mexico, and Texas.
Pine nuts (Pinus spp.)	Unshelled and shelled Korean pine nuts	Northern hemisphere.	Seeds extracted from woody cones.	In 2017, world production was 23,600 tons, the main producing countries being South Korea, Russia, China, Pakistan, and Afghanistan.
Pistachio (Pistacia vera)	Pistacho shell with the seed visible	Native to Central Asia, where it is a desert tree.	The fruit is a drupe, containing a single elongated seed in a hard, cream-coloured shell, which abruptly splits open when ripe.	World production in 2019 totalled 0.9 million tonnes, the main producing countries being Iran and the United States, with lesser quantities coming from China and Turkey.
Walnut (Juglans regia); Black walnut (Juglans nigra)	Whole walnuts and kernel	J. regia originated in south eastern Europe, western/central Asia, and J. nigra originated in the eastern United States.	The fruit is a pseudo-drupe with a green, semi-fleshy husk.	In 2019, world production of walnuts in shells was 4.5 million tonnes, predominantly grown in China, with other notable producing countries being the United States and Iran.

== Toxicity ==
Nuts used for food are a common source of food allergens. Reactions can range from mild symptoms to a condition known as anaphylaxis, a severe adverse reaction that can be life-threatening. The reaction is due to the release of histamine by the body in response to an allergen in the nuts, causing skin and other possible reactions. Many experts suggest that a person with an allergy to peanuts should avoid eating tree nuts, and vice versa.

In the European Union, foods containing nuts must be labelled. The EU regulation requires labelling of foods containing peanuts or nuts, specified as:

- almonds (Amygdalus communis L.),
- hazelnuts (Corylus avellana),
- walnuts (Juglans regia),
- cashews (Anacardium occidentale),
- pecan nuts (Carya illinoinensis (Wangenh.) K. Koch),
- Brazil nuts (Bertholletia excelsa),
- pistachio nuts (Pistacia vera),
- macadamia or Queensland nuts (Macadamia ternifolia)

and products thereof, except for nuts used for making alcoholic distillates including ethyl alcohol of agricultural origin.

== Nutrition ==
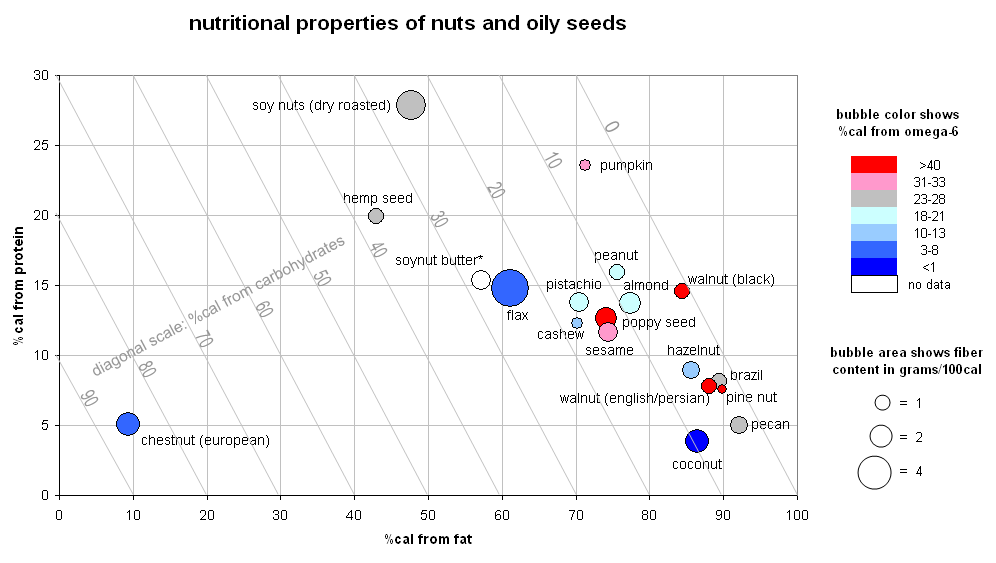
Graph of nutritional properties of nuts and oily seeds

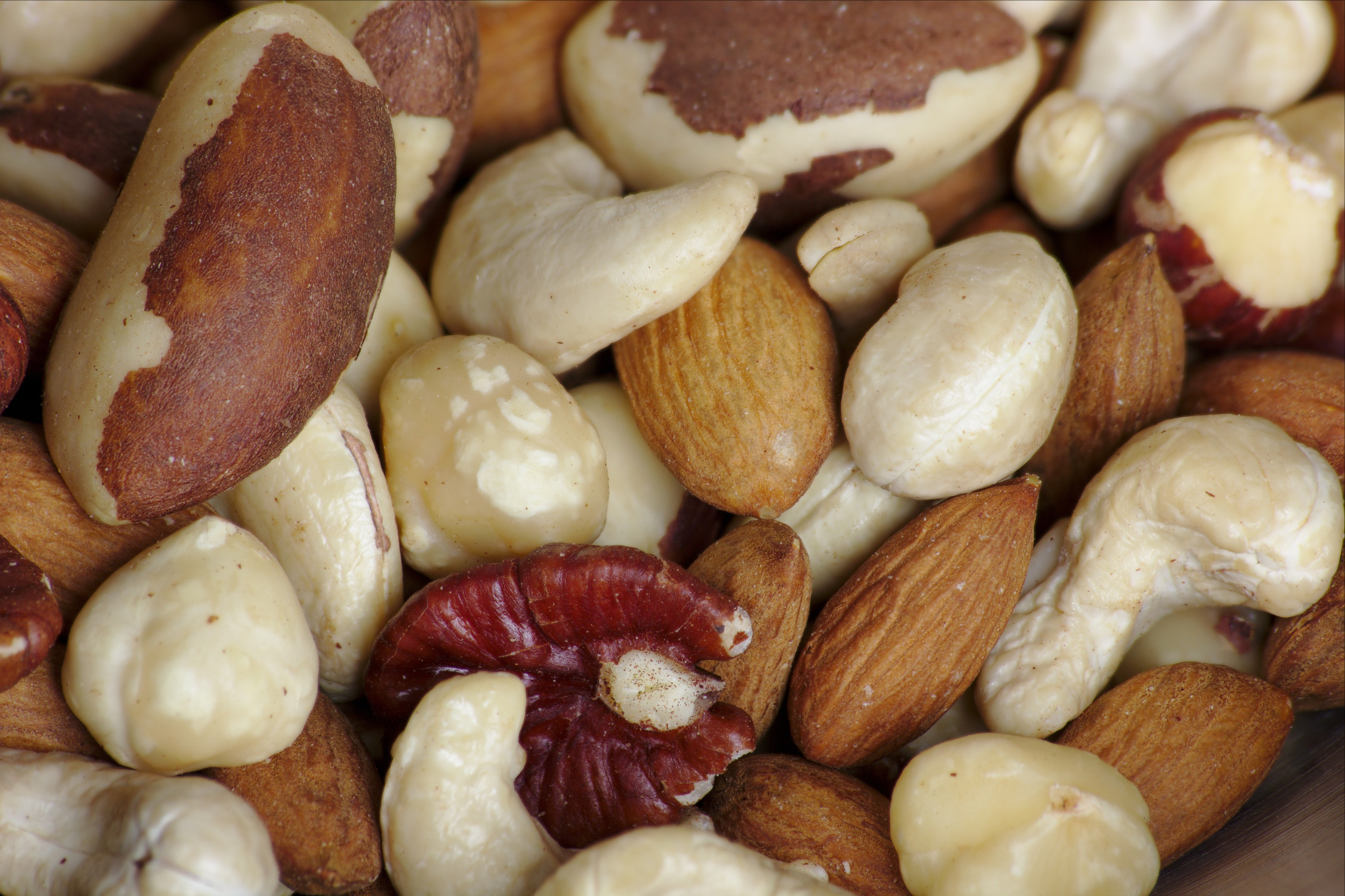
Raw mixed nuts, sold as a snack food

Nuts contain the diverse nutrients that are needed for the growth of a new plant. Composition varies, but they tend to have a low water and carbohydrate content, with high levels of fats, protein, dietary minerals, and vitamins. The digestibility of the nut protein is approximately 90% and is slightly lower than that of meat and fish, but may be improved by chewing thoroughly. The fats in nuts are largely unsaturated and nuts are a source of essential omega-3 fatty acids.

As part of a healthy human diet, long-term consumption of diverse nutrients in nuts may contribute to a lower risk of cardiovascular diseases, reduced levels of blood cholesterol, and lower all-cause mortality. For vegetarians and vegans, nuts provide many of the essential nutrients which may be in short supply in other plant foods.

Nuts supply nutrients for humans and wildlife. Because nuts generally have a high oil content, they are a significant energy source. Many seeds are edible by humans and used in cooking, eaten raw, sprouted, or roasted as a snack food, ground to make nut butters, or pressed for oil that is used in cooking and cosmetics. Regular nut consumption of more than 5 ounces (140 g) per week may benefit weight control and contribute to lowering body weight in humans.

=== Constituents ===
Nuts are the source of energy and nutrients for the new plant. They contain a relatively large quantity of calories, essential unsaturated and monounsaturated fats including linoleic acid, and linolenic acid, vitamins, and essential amino acids. Many nuts are good sources of vitamin E, vitamin B_{2}, folate, fiber, and essential minerals, such as magnesium, phosphorus, potassium, copper, and selenium.

This table lists the percentage of various nutrients contained in four unroasted seeds. Units are presumably grams, and out of 100 g.

Name	Protein	Total fat	Saturated fat	Polyunsaturated fat	Monounsaturated fat	Carbohydrate
Almonds	21.26	50.64	3.881	12.214	32.155	28.1
Walnuts	15.23	65.21	6.126	47.174	8.933	19.56
Peanuts	23.68	49.66	6.893	15.694	24.64	26.66
Pistachio	20.61	44.44	5.44	13.455	23.319	34.95

=== Research ===
Nuts are under preliminary research to assess whether their consumption is associated with lower risk for some diseases, such as cardiovascular diseases and cancer. A 2014 review indicated that consuming one or more servings of nuts or peanut butter per day was associated with lower risk of ischemic heart disease, overall cardiovascular disease, stroke in women, and all-cause mortality. A 2022 umbrella review confirmed these findings and found a 22% reduction in all-cause mortality.

== See also ==
- Achene
- List of culinary nuts
- List of edible seeds
- List of foods
- Nutcracker
- Nutmeg
