= Mixed nuts =

Snack food containing a mixture of nuts

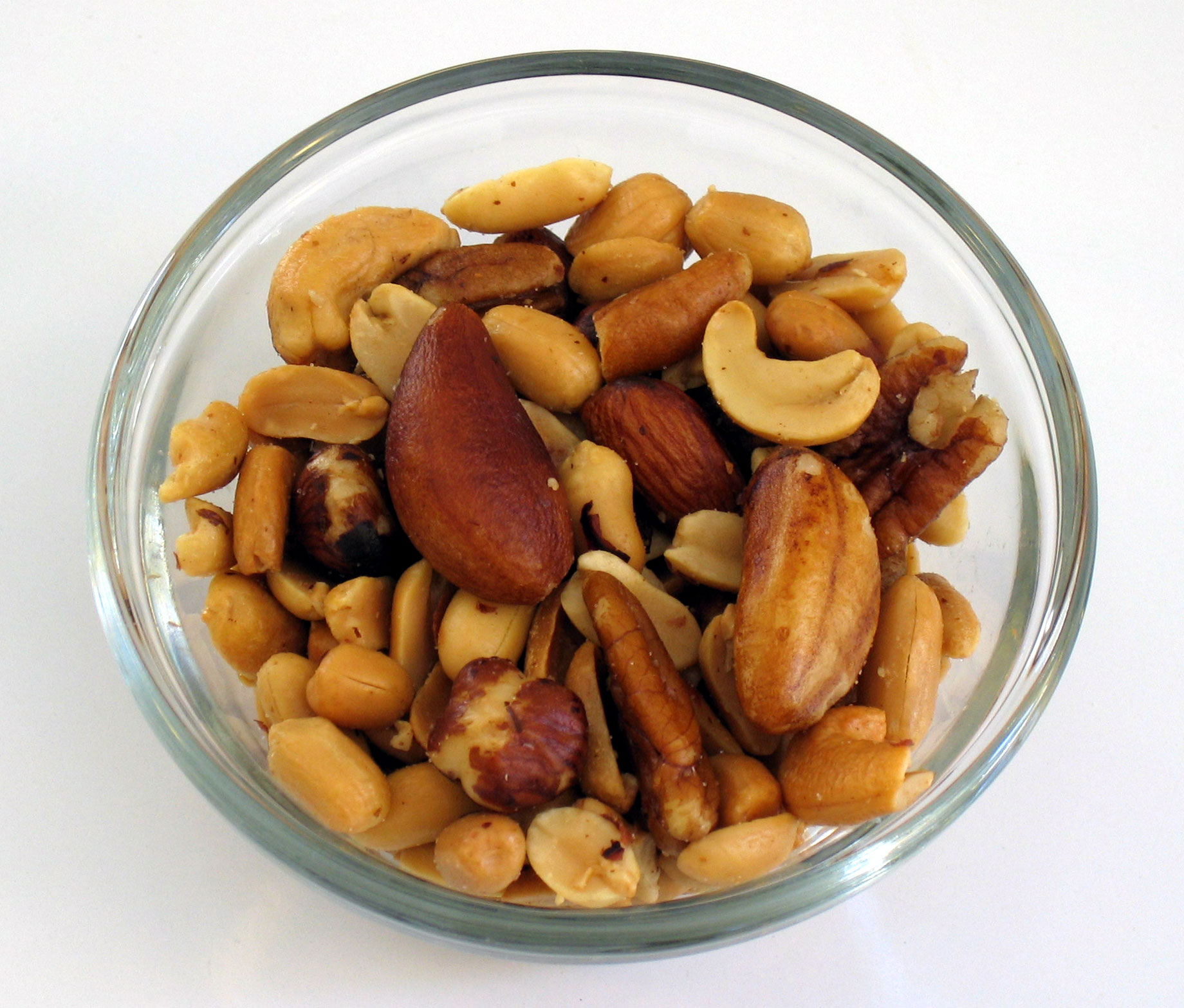
A bowl of mixed nuts

Mixed nuts are a snack food consisting of any mixture of mechanically or manually combined nuts. Common constituents are peanuts (actually a legume), almonds, walnuts, Brazil nuts, cashews, hazelnuts (filberts), and pecans. Mixed nuts may be salted, roasted, cooked, or blanched.

In addition to being eaten directly, mixed nuts can be used in cooking, such as for Tunisian farka, tarts, and toffee. Trail mix consists of nuts mixed with raisins and other dry ingredients.

== Market ==
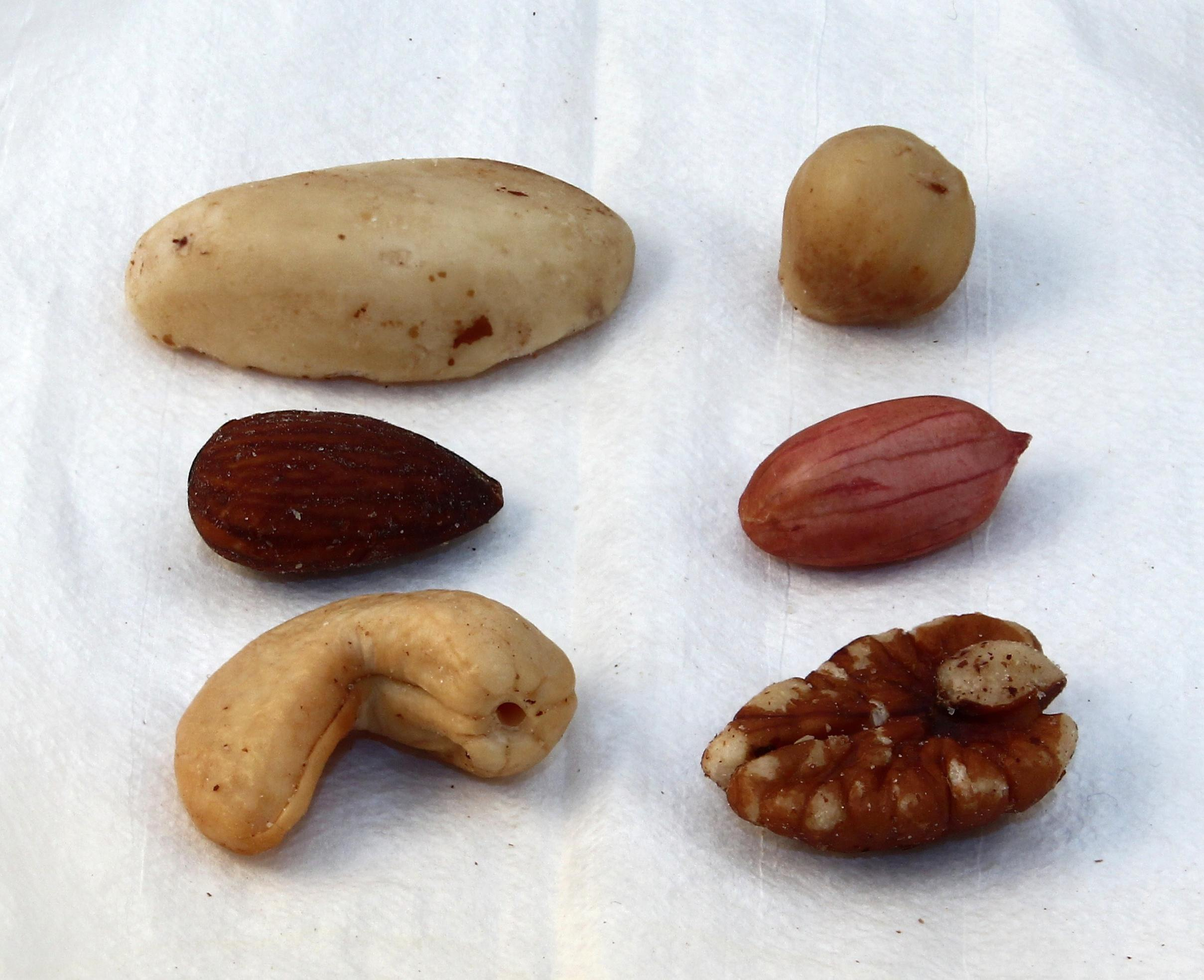
Nuts typically included in commercial mixed nuts. Clockwise from top left: Brazil nut, hazelnut, peanut, pecan, cashew, almond.

In Japan, mixed nuts are the second most popular table nuts, behind sweet chestnuts; in the United States, they are second only to peanuts. Mixed nuts have also gained in popularity in the Argentinian market, which imported some $1.9 million in 1997, nearly half from the U.S. During the year 2002, U.S. companies sold $783 million of mixed nuts incorporating four or more varieties, mostly in canned form, representing hundreds of millions of pounds.

The individual nuts that make up mixed nuts are harvested from all over the world. As a Dallas Fed publication supporting free trade puts it,

"In the average can of mixed nuts, you might find almonds from Italy, walnuts from China, Brazil nuts from Bolivia, cashews from India, pistachios from Turkey, hazelnuts from Canada—a true international assortment."

This reality provides an incentive for nut salters to favor free trade for nuts, as opposed to nut farmers, who would generally support trade barriers. In fact, one historical argument for United States salters is that importing nuts can encourage domestic production, since mixed nuts provide a "wagon" on which everyone's sales ride. For example, cashews are not produced in North America, and it is necessary to import them because mixed nuts are essential to the sale of pecans, which are grown exclusively in North America.

== Composition ==
Peanuts are typically a major ingredient in mixed nuts, because they are relatively inexpensive; mixes which contain no peanuts are often sold as a "deluxe" option. In 2006, a batch of Alrifai brand "deluxe" mixed nuts was recalled after it was found that peanuts had been added to the mix.

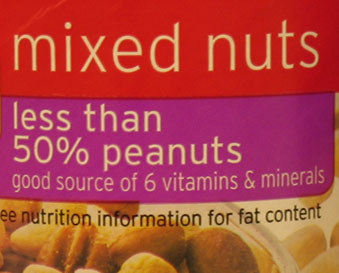
A mixed nut selection described as "less than 50% peanuts"

Some brands of mixed nuts advertise themselves to contain "less than 50% peanuts". For a 60 Minutes segment that originally aired in 1997, Andy Rooney tested such a 12-ounce (340 g) can of Planters brand nuts, and determined that "there was a tiny fraction less than six ounces of peanuts ... amazing precision for a nut factory." Later, in 2004, a cockeyed.com How much is inside? episode estimated that the peanut weight percentage in two such 11.5 oz cans was, in fact, a little over 50%.

Besides peanuts, cashews are usually the next least expensive nut, and in deluxe mixes they tend to be the most common ingredient. Hazelnuts and Brazil nuts are also relatively cheap, while pecans are the most expensive ingredient.

== Processing ==
There are two different ways the nuts can be processed. The first is dry roasting, where heat is applied indirectly to the products. It is important that the nuts or seeds are stirred constantly to avoid over- and under-cooking. This method requires no additional ingredients. The second is oil frying, where the nuts go into preheated oil for a certain amount of time. There are various oil roasting methods from continuous, batch and curtain fryers. The ultimate impact on the nuts can vary; both methods are recommended by studies.

== Regulations ==
=== United States ===
Percent composition by weight is a serious matter in the U.S., where mixed nuts have been regulated by the Food and Drug Administration since 1977. Up to that point, the phrase "mixed nuts" had been legally meaningless. A 1964 Consumer Reports investigation of 124 cans of mixed nuts, representing 31 brands bought in 17 American cities, determined that most mixed nuts of the time were mostly peanuts, often 75%; peanutless brands were usually dominated by cashews. Many cans bore misleading labels or were underfilled. Consumer Reports concluded, "What's needed of course is a Federal standard of identity...", detailing a list that of requirements that, with the exception of their desire to limit broken nuts, anticipated the 1977 rules.

On March 15, 1977, the FDA promulgated a new standard of identity for mixed nuts in 42 FR 14475. The present standard, as modified by 58 FR 2885, Jan. 6, 1993, requires that mixed nuts must contain at least four different varieties of tree nuts or peanuts. (Products with three or fewer varieties are now commonly labelled as simply "mixes".) The container volume must be at least 85% filled, and the label must state whether any peanuts are unblanched or of the Spanish variety.

The most detailed section deals with weight percentages, which specifies that "Each such kind of nut ingredient when used shall be present in a quantity not less than 2 percent and not more than 80 percent by weight of the finished food." If a variety X exceeds 50%, the label must conspicuously state "contains up to 60% X", and so on in 10% increments up to 80%. (The first example given by the FDA is "contains up to 60% pecans".) When testing mixed nuts for compliance, the FDA samples at least 24 pounds to reduce sampling error.

Modifying words like "fancy" or "choice" have not historically carried any legal meaning in the United States, and they remain absent from the current regulations. In a 1915 federal case against "fancy mixed nuts" that were argued by competitors to be an inferior grade, U. S. v. 25 Bags of Nuts, N. J. No. 4329 (1915), the court declined to accept a trade standard. The ruling said

It seems to me that until the Department establishes a set standard of quality... it would be altogether unsafe... to make them amenable to such a vague and indefinite standard as I understand the Government seeks to establish by the testimony of men engaged in the business of handling nuts.

== Analogies ==
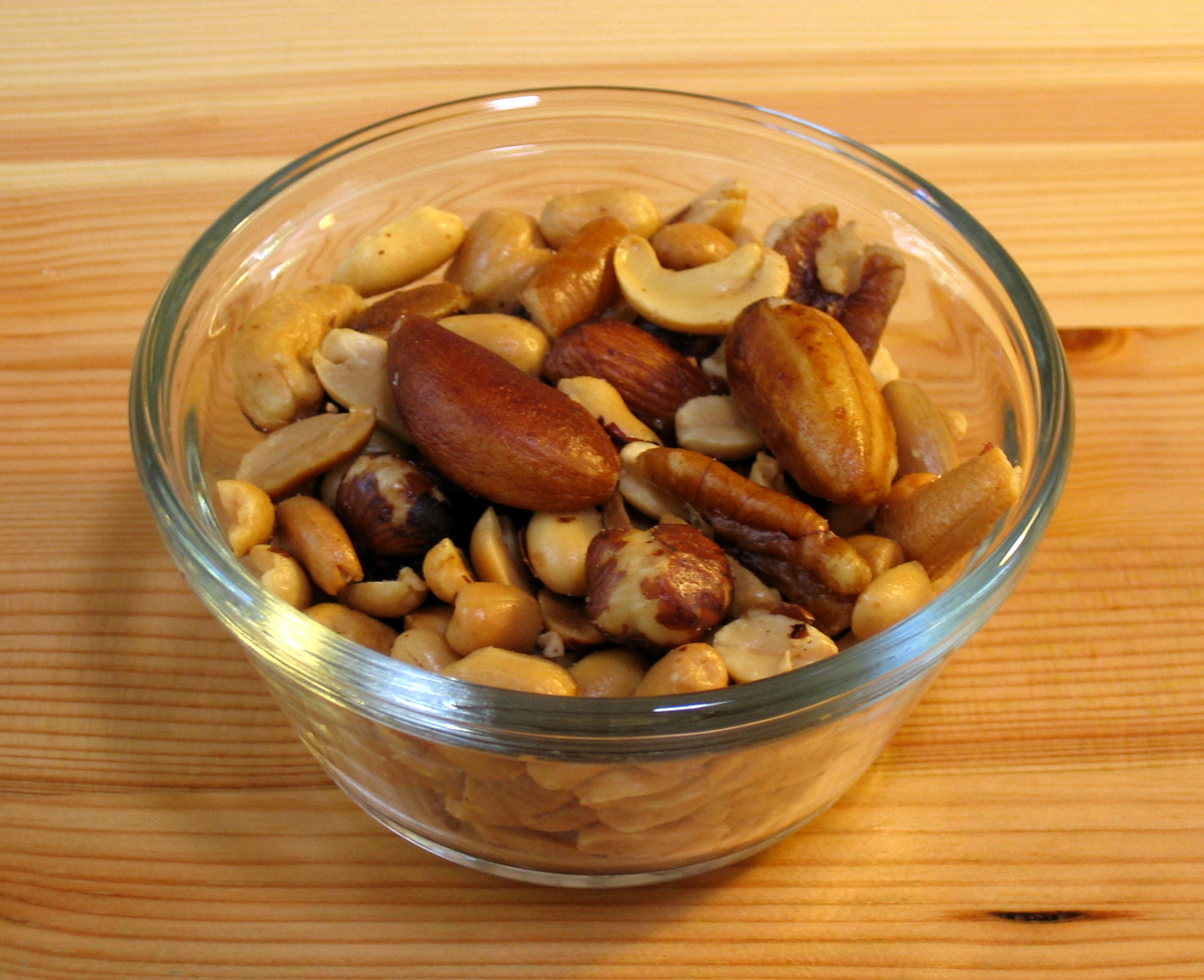
Brazil nuts resting on top of peanuts, demonstrating the Brazil nut effect

When a container of mixed nuts is opened after it has been shaken, the larger nuts tend to be on top. This phenomenon is known as the Brazil nut effect in the study of granular materials.

The phrase "mixed nuts" is also used to indicate a mixture of disparate elements other than nuts, as in the film Mixed Nuts.
