= Nut (fruit) =

Fruit with outer shell protecting kernel

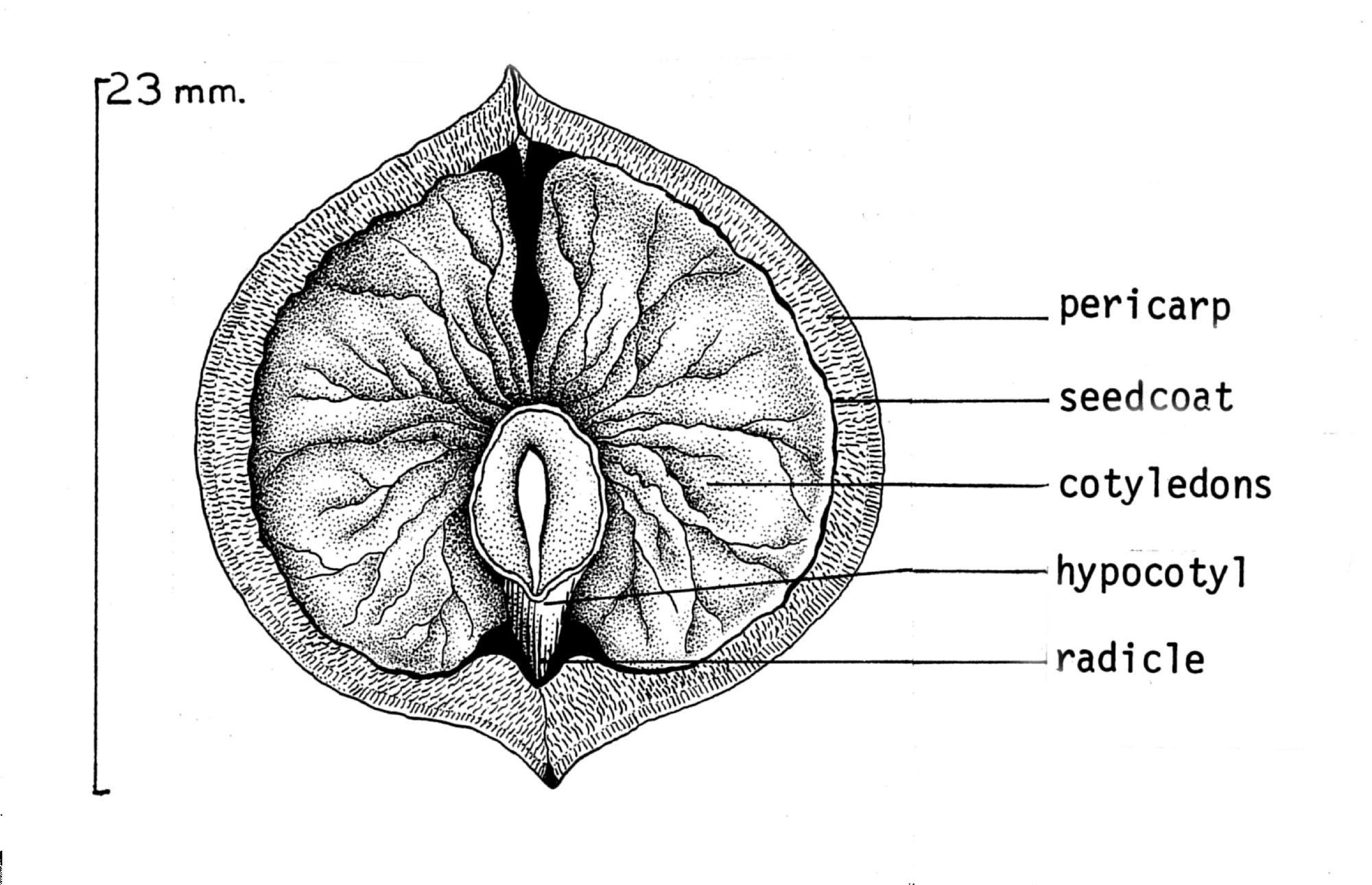
Diagram of a shagbark hickory nut

A nut is a fruit consisting of a hard or tough nutshell protecting a single seed. In botany, the use of the term nut implies that the shell does not open to release the seed (a property known as indehiscence).

Whereas most seeds come from fruit that naturally free themselves from their shell, this is not the case in true nuts (such as hazelnuts, chestnuts, and acorns), which have hard shell walls and originate from a compound ovary. Because nuts do not open of their own accord, they rely on external vectors of seed dispersal, such as consumption and excretion by herbivores.

== Definition ==
Yearly per capita supply of nuts

A seed is the mature fertilised ovule of a plant; it consists of three parts, the embryo which will develop into a new plant, stored food for the embryo, and a protective seed coat. Botanically, a nut is a fruit with a woody pericarp developing from a syncarpous gynoecium. Nuts may be contained in an involucre, a cup-shaped structure formed from the flower bracts. The involucre may be scaly, spiny, leafy or tubular, depending on the species of nut. Most nuts come from the pistils with inferior ovaries (see flower) and all are indehiscent (not opening at maturity). True nuts are produced by plant families of the order Fagales. These include beech (Fagus), chestnut (Castanea), oak (Quercus), stone-oak (Lithocarpus) and tanoak (Notholithocarpus) in the family Fagaceae, as well as hazel, filbert (Corylus) and hornbeam (Carpinus) in the family Betulaceae.

A small nut may be called a "nutlet" (formerly called a nucule, a term otherwise referring to the oogonium of stoneworts). In botany, the term "nutlet" can be used to describe a pyrena or pyrene, which is a seed covered by a stony layer, such as the kernel of a drupe. Walnuts and hickories, including pecans, (Juglandaceae) have fruit that are difficult to classify. They are considered to be nuts under some definitions, including by the authoritative Angiosperm Phylogeny Group, but are also referred to as drupaceous nuts by some others.

Production of treenuts

Treenut yield

== Toxicity ==
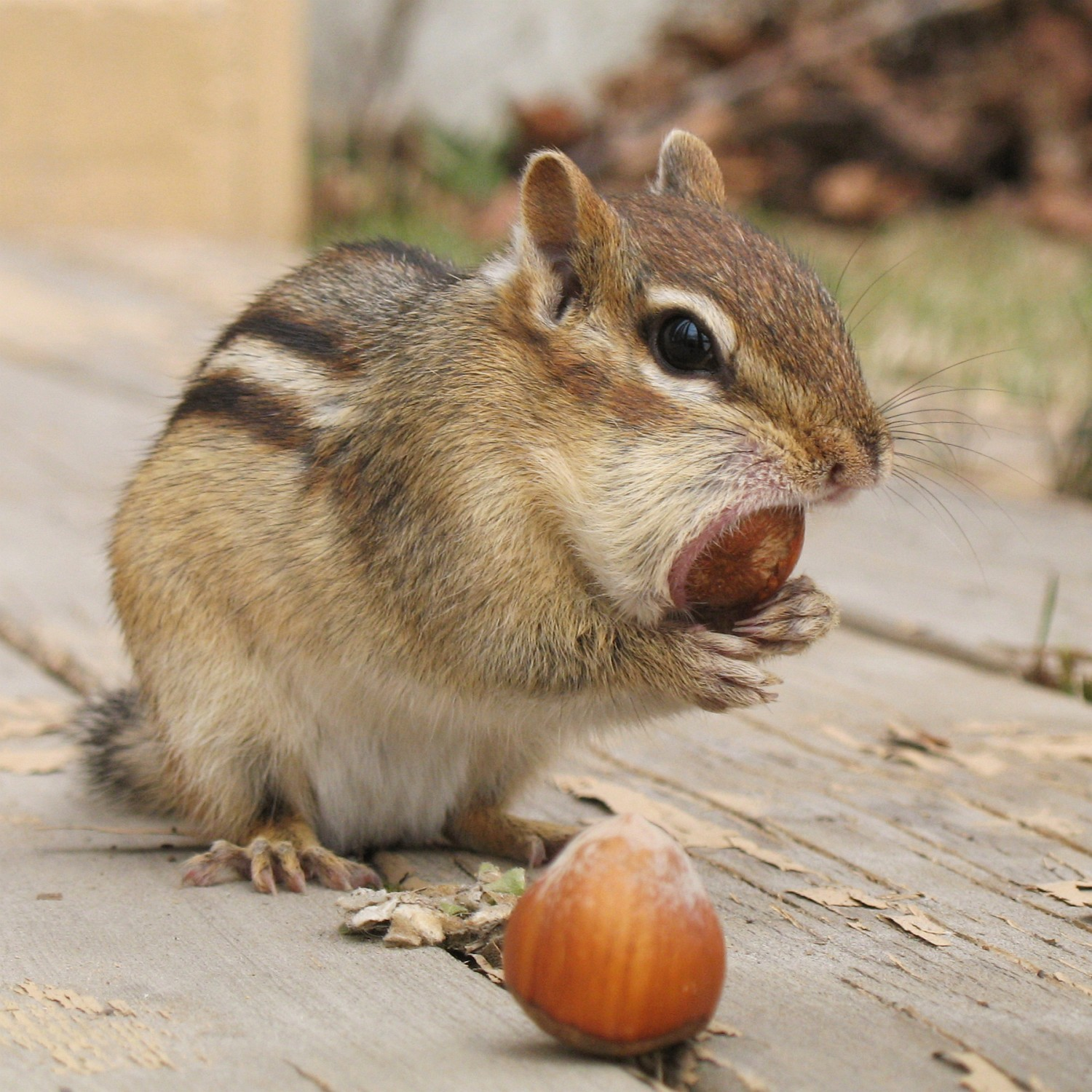
An Eastern chipmunk (Tamias striatus) with a hazelnut in its mouth

Nuts used for food are a common source of food allergens. Reactions can range from mild symptoms to severe ones, a condition known as anaphylaxis, which can be life-threatening. The reaction is due to the release of histamine by the body in response to an allergen in the nuts, causing skin and other possible reactions. Tree nut allergies are distinct from peanut allergy, as peanuts are legumes, whereas a tree nut is a hard-shelled nut; however, experts suggest that a person with an allergy to peanuts should avoid eating tree nuts, and vice versa.

== Consumption as food ==
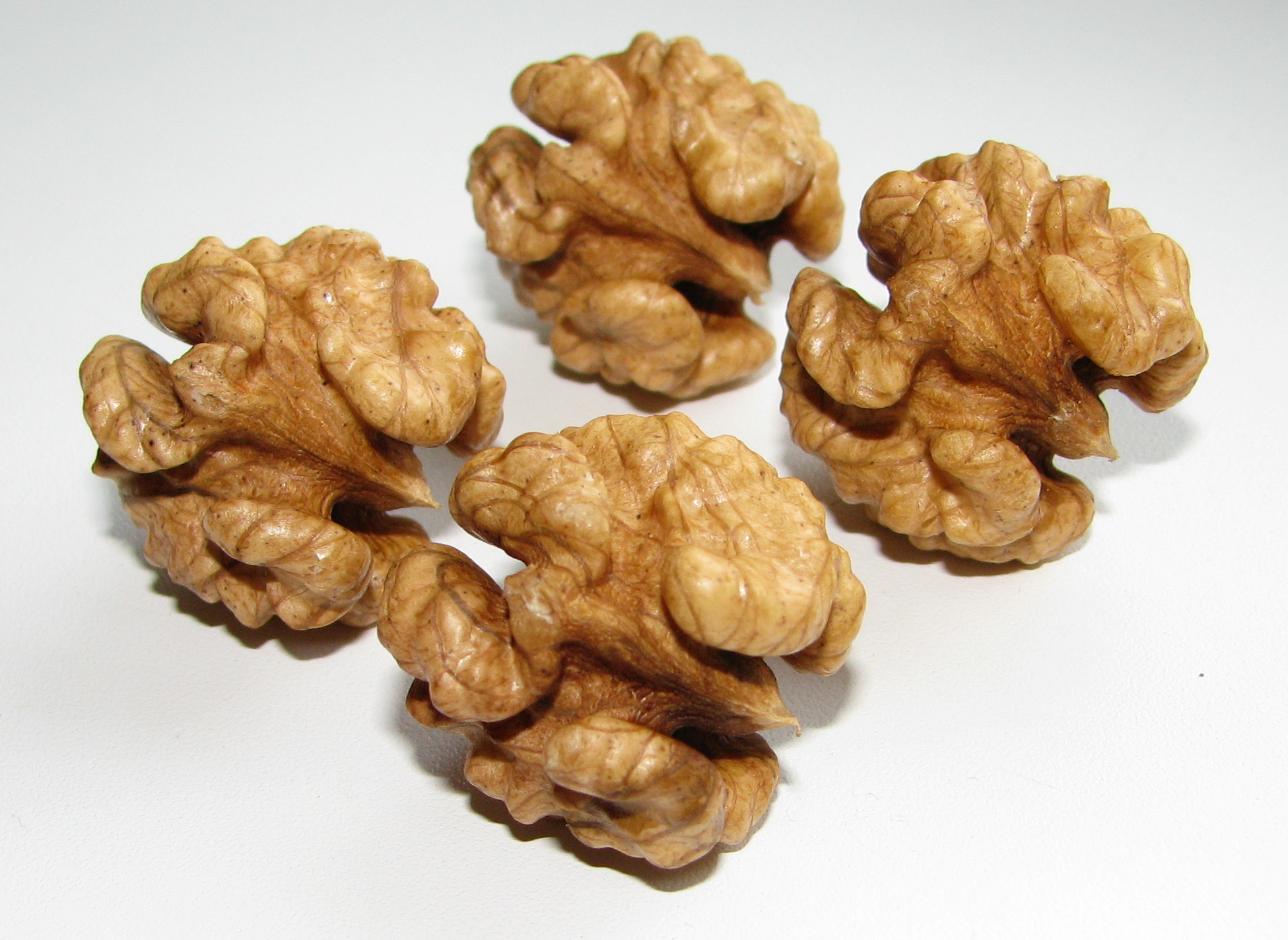
Walnut kernels

For wildlife and humans, nuts supply a relatively large quantity of calories from unsaturated fats, such as linoleic acid and linolenic acid, and monounsaturated fats. Nuts are rich sources of B vitamins, vitamin E, and essential amino acids.

Although nutrient composition varies slightly among different nuts, they generally have low water and carbohydrate content, with high levels of protein, dietary minerals, and dietary fibre.

Many nuts and seeds are edible and used in cooking, eaten raw, sprouted, or roasted as a snack food, soaked in water and filtered to make nut milk, ground to make nut butters, or pressed for oil that is used in cooking and cosmetics.

== See also ==
- Nut (food)
- List of culinary nuts
- List of edible seeds
- Nutmeg
- Nutcracker
- Achene
