= Racti Art Production & Distribution =

- Company type: Dubbing and translation studio
- Founded: 1990 in Beirut, Lebanon
- Headquarters: Beirut, Lebanon; UAE
- Area served: MENA
- Website: racti.com

Racti Art Production & Distribution (Arabic: راكتي للإنتاج والتوزيع الفني) is a Lebanese dubbing and translation company, it's dubbing and translating films and TV series.

== Filmography ==
=== Animated series ===
- Burn! Top Striker
- A Cow, A Cat and the Ocean
- Dive Olly Dive
- Heidi
- Jeanie with the Light Brown Hair
- Lightspeed Electroid Albegas
- Little Women
- Little Women II: Jo's Boys
- Me and My Robot
- Mechakko Dotakon
- The New Adventures of Lassie
- Nouky & Friends
- Pet Alien
- Salad Juyushi Tomatoman
- Space Racers

=== Animated films ===
- A Bug's Life (Classical Arabic version)
- Atlantis: The Lost Empire (Classical Arabic version)
- Atlantis: Milo's Return (Classical Arabic version)
- WALL-E (Classical Arabic version)

== Voice actors ==
- Abdo Hakim
- Ali Fakih
- Ali Saad
- Asmahan Bitar
- Fadi Rifai
- Imad Feghaly
- Jamal Hamdan
- Omar Al-Shammaa
- Rosie Al-Yaziji
