= Farra Design Center =

Lebanese company

FARRA Design Center
- Type: Private
- Genre: Retail (Specialty)
- Founded: Beirut, Lebanon (1939)
- Founder: Anwar Farra
- Headquarters: 155 Mkalles Main Street, Mkalles (Beirut) Lebanon
- Area served: Lebanon, Middle-East, Europe & Western Asia
- Products: Furniture and Home Accessories
- Website: FARRA.com

FARRA Design Center is a privately held home products retail store that sells imported furniture and home accessories. The company originated in Beirut, Lebanon, and started as a raw material supplier. The first FARRA store opened in Downtown Beirut in 1976 then moved to Dekwaneh in the early 1980s. In 2004, the company constructed a 7 floors showroom and moved its flagship store to Mkalles (Beirut).

FARRA was founded in 1939 by Anwar Farra in Lebanon named after his family name. It is now privately held by the founder’s family and has since changed its legal name to: Société les fils d’Anwar Farra SAL under Lebanese entrepreneurial laws.

== FARRA history ==
FARRA Design Center started as a raw material supplier in 1939 for furniture manufacturing and became a furniture importer and distributor in Lebanon.

=== 1910-1960 ===
The founder, Anwar Farra, was born in 1911. The company specialized in the import of raw material for the wood furnishing and furniture manufacturing industries.

=== 1960-1990 ===
The company expanded in the successful years of Lebanon, with the development of new hotels and the need for tourist facilities. Around the 1980s, La Société les Fils d’Anwar Farra SARL was created when the company became operated by Anwar Farra closest family members.

=== 1990s-2010s ===
From exclusive wholesaler supplier, the stores gave a larger focus on the consumer market. In 2004, FARRA moved its flagship store to Mkalles Main Road.

The company had an impact in its community with charitable donations. It started in 2004 a philanthropic division called Divine Details aimed to help young designers and architecture students become creative through competition, enhance their portfolios and find opportunities for local employment. The company is now one of the most recognizable brands in Lebanon.

== FARRA Stores ==
The company was launched in 1939 as a raw material supplier. The first FARRA store opened in Downtown Beirut in 1976 then moved to Dekwaneh in the early 1980s. Its store moved to a newly constructed building on Mkalles Main Street in 2004.

=== Store format ===
The store has an architecture that uses glass on its rooftop with white painted side walls. Skylights provide natural lighting that reduces energy costs.

Not all furniture is displayed in the store. Particular colors of living rooms may be stocked in the warehouse and is presented on-demand. The FARRA Design Center website contains an overview of its furniture and home accessories collections.

== Products ==
FARRA furniture is assembled by the company technicians.

=== Furniture ===
FARRA furniture is both locally engineered and designed in its interior design department and imported from international suppliers. FARRA was as of 2012 one of the largest Lebanese furniture importer from North America and Europe (Italy and Spain).

== International and Middle East design Projects ==
FARRA quotes International architectural and interior design projects.

=== Hotel and Restaurant Supplier ===
FARRA has interior architects which can undergo heavyweight renovation and decoration projects.deliver the final products.

=== Projects done ===
==== Lebano] Projects ====
- Byblos Palace Hotel (Byblos)
- Ramada Downtown Hotel (Downtown, Beirut)
- Markazia Monroe Suites Hotel (Downtown, Beirut)

==== Qatar Project ====
- Spring Compound Villas (Al Gharrafa)

==== Kuwait project ====
- Amaia Residence (Kuwait City)

==== Iraq project ====
- As-Salam Palace, Presidential Peace Palace (Baghdad)

==== Cyprus project ====
- Residential Resort (Limassol)

== FARRA Corporate Social Responsibility (CSR) ==
=== Charitable giving ===
FARRA is involved in several Lebanese charitable causes particularly with:

- Injaz (Lebanon) division of Junior Achievement Worldwide - Extra-curricular entrepreneurship training to students in both public and private schools
- Trees4Lebanon (Lebanon) – Objective to plant 1 million trees by 2020

Part of its philanthropy program, FARRA provides at the disposition of non-profit associations 1000m^{2} of its main floor to allow them to organize events and raise money for charity.

=== Environmental responsibility ===
The company selects suppliers with accountable productions, eco-sustainable values (for every tree cut, a new one is planted), and that respects ISO quality environmental standards. The company is one of the sponsors of the Lebanese Rotary project Trees4Lebanon which projects to plant 1 million new trees by 2020.

=== FARRA events ===
FARRA founded in 2004 a non-for-profit philanthropic division called Divine Details which is dedicated to promote creativity in interior design and student projects.

==== Divine Details events ====
- Furniture competition (2004)
- Lebanese Painters Exhibit (2010)
- Christmas Tree competition (2010)
- Divine Details Inter-University Furniture Contest (2011)
