= Zaatar w Zeit =

Lebanese urban eatery franchise

Zaatar w Zeit (Breakfast & Co. S.A.L.)
- Company type: Société Anonyme Libanaise (S.A.L.)
- Industry: Restaurant
- Founded: 1999; 27 years ago
- Founders: Donald Daccache, Antoine Bou Chdid, Marwan Atallah
- Headquarters: Zouk Mosbeh, Lebanon
- Areas served: Lebanon, United Arab Emirates, KSA, Kuwait, Qatar, Canada, Egypt, India.
- Products: Wraps, salads, manakeesh, coffees and juices
- Number of employees: 2,850

Zaatar w Zeit (stylized as zaatar w zeit; Arabic: زعتر وزيت), a commercial brand of the Lebanese company Breakfast & Co. S.A.L., is an urban eatery franchise founded in Lebanon in 1999 and operating with 23 outlets in Lebanon and more than 70 outlets throughout the Middle East, including 20 in the United Arab Emirates. The company also has outlets in Kuwait, Qatar, Saudi Arabia and Canada and most recently, Egypt and India.

The name refers to thyme, or za'atar in Arabic – a common Middle Eastern herb in Levantine Arabic cuisine used notably in preparation of za'atar manakeesh and other recipes – and zeit (Arabic for olive oil in this context). The franchise has introduced a far more varied menu than just za'atar-based products.

== Company ==
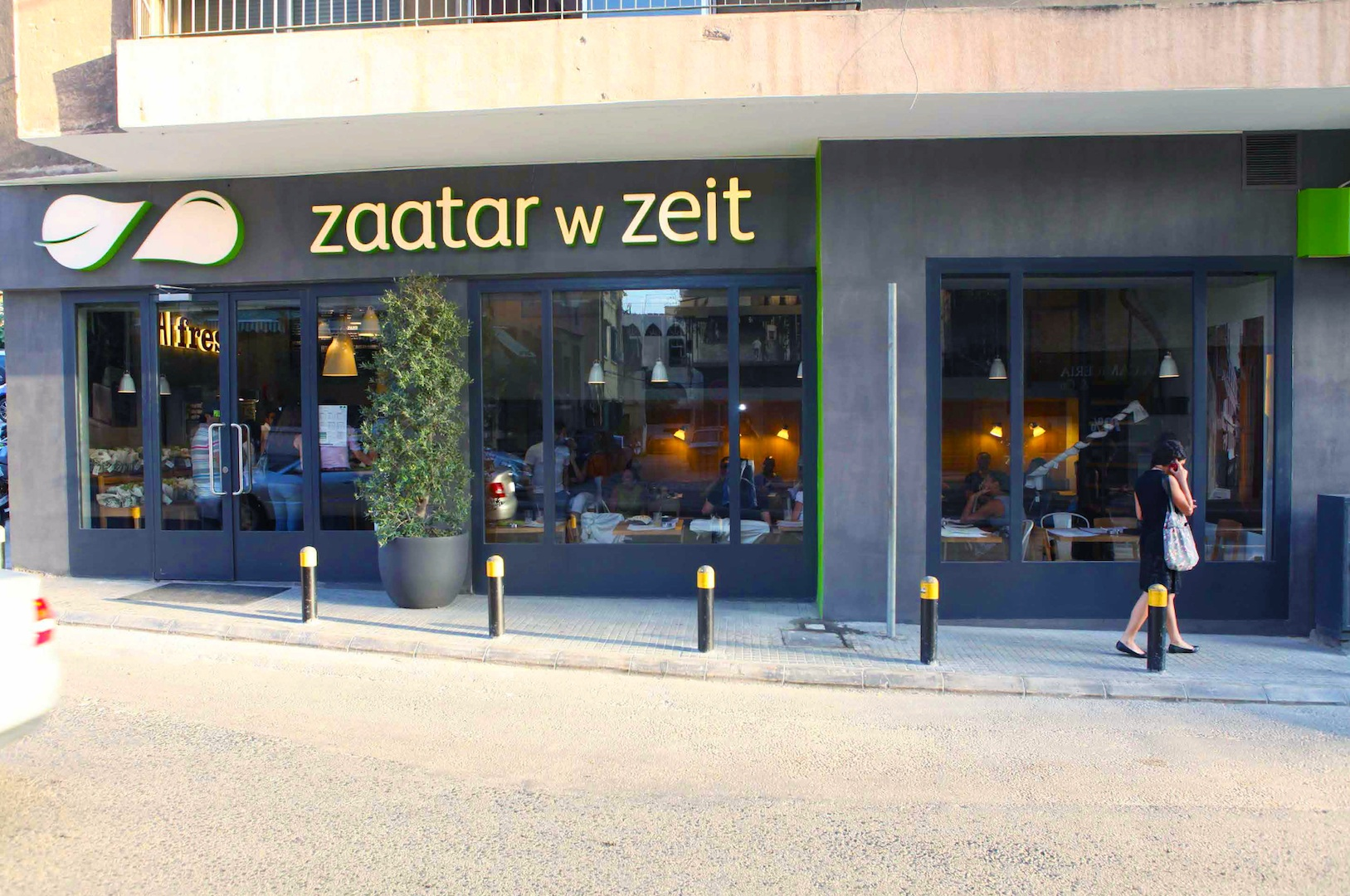
Zaatar W Zeit's first operating branch in Sodeco, Beirut in 1999

=== History and expansion ===
Zaatar w Zeit restaurant started as a self-operating business in Lebanon and has expanded through more branches in Lebanon and with franchisees abroad. Headquartered in Jeita, Zouk Mosbeh, Lebanon, it is one of Lebanon's largest restaurant chains. The central kitchen and warehouses are also in Jeita, Zouk Mosbeh. The company began back in 1999 selling Lebanese dough food such as manakish. They also have international operations in a number of countries in the Middle East.

==== United Arab Emirates and Saudi Arabia ====
Food conglomerate Cravia has operated franchises in the United Arab Emirates and in the KSA. A number of outlets in the UAE are open 24/7. A discount is offered to government employees with the Esaad card or with the Fazaa card. In some areas of Dubai, electric delivery motorbikes have been trialed since late 2018 in an attempt to increase operational sustainability.

"Zaatar w Zeit" was the first Lebanese restaurant chain to be certified with the ISO 22000:2005 in April 2008.

The company has made donations to various charities.

Logo

In 2011, Pearl Fisher created a new visual identity for Lebanese food retail chain, aiming for a "bolder contemporary look and feel". Jonathan Ford, the Creative Partner in Pearl Fisher, said, "The new logo is a distinctive, modern marque that provides a more literal and graphic expression by creating a simple link between the thyme and the oil, the leaf and the droplet, and forms a distinctive "Z" within the negative space."
