= Eastline Marketing =

Eastline Digital
- Formerly: Eastline Marketing
- Industry: Digital marketing
- Founded: 2006; 20 years ago
- Founders: Marc Dfouni, Nemr Nicolas Badine
- Website: eastlinemarketing.com

Eastline Digital (formerly Eastline Marketing) is a digital marketing agency based in the Middle East. It was one of the first companies in the MENA region to offer a full range of online marketing services such as social media marketing, paid search marketing (PSM), search engine optimization (SEO) and online advertising.

== History ==
The agency was founded in 2006 by Marc Dfouni and Nemr Nicolas Badine. Prior to Eastline’s establishment, Dfouni was the general manager of a web interactive agency in Canada. Badine meanwhile designed multimedia systems used in live performances by artists such as U2, Paul McCartney and Madonna. At the time of Eastline’s inception, the online marketing field was virtually nonexistent in the MENA region. However, little by little, Internet use in the Middle East began growing considerably. As a result of this, the agency started expanding its operations and working with clients based in Dubai, Qatar, Egypt, Syria and Saudi Arabia.

Eastline has developed campaigns for Middle Eastern and global brands such as Toyota, AZADEA Group, DHL, Kimberly-Clark, Bank Audi, Fransabank, Henkel, Avis, AXA Insurance, Marks & Spencer, JoueClub, and Waterfront City. It also organized and implemented a holistic online strategy for the 2009 Beirut Marathon. The agency has produced its own web platform named Sweepz, which allows clients to launch social media promotional campaigns. Sweepz is the only platform that supports the Arabic language.

Dfouni and Badine were selected as high impact entrepreneurs by Endeavor (an NGO that supports entrepreneurs of emerging market countries) in 2011. Dfouni was also selected as a Young Creative Entrepreneur by the British Council’s Creative Economy Programme. According to Dfouni, the company’s main aim is to “become the leading digital marketing player in the Middle East by 2016”.

== Awards ==
Eastline Digital has garnered two Webby awards for Best Green Site and also won the People’s Voice Award. It was successful in 2010 at the Gemini Awards where it won the Best Original Program or Series Produced for Digital Media. This award was given out by the Academy of Canadian Cinema & Television for the website “Love Letters of the Future”, designed to raise public awareness of the 2009 Copenhagen Summit and environmental issues. It was also a finalist at the Cannes Lions International Advertising Festival in 2010 and at the SXSW Awards. In 2013, Eastline Digital's founders earned the Endeavor Advocate award at the 2013 Omidyar Network.
