= Asmahan Bitar =

Lebanese voice actress

- أسمهان بيطار
- Born: Lebanon
- Occupation: Voice actress

Asmahan Bitar (Arabic: أسمهان بيطار) is a Lebanese voice actress.

== Filmography ==
=== Animated series ===
- Angel's Friends : Raf
- 1001 Nights - Donyazad
- Winx Club : Stella (Rai Dub Season 1–3)
- Totally Spies : Clover

=== Anime ===
- Little Women
- Pokémon Journeys : Jessie, Cynthia

=== Live action series ===
- Prophet Joseph - Asenath
