= Alrifai =

Lebanese snack food company

Al Rifai International Holding
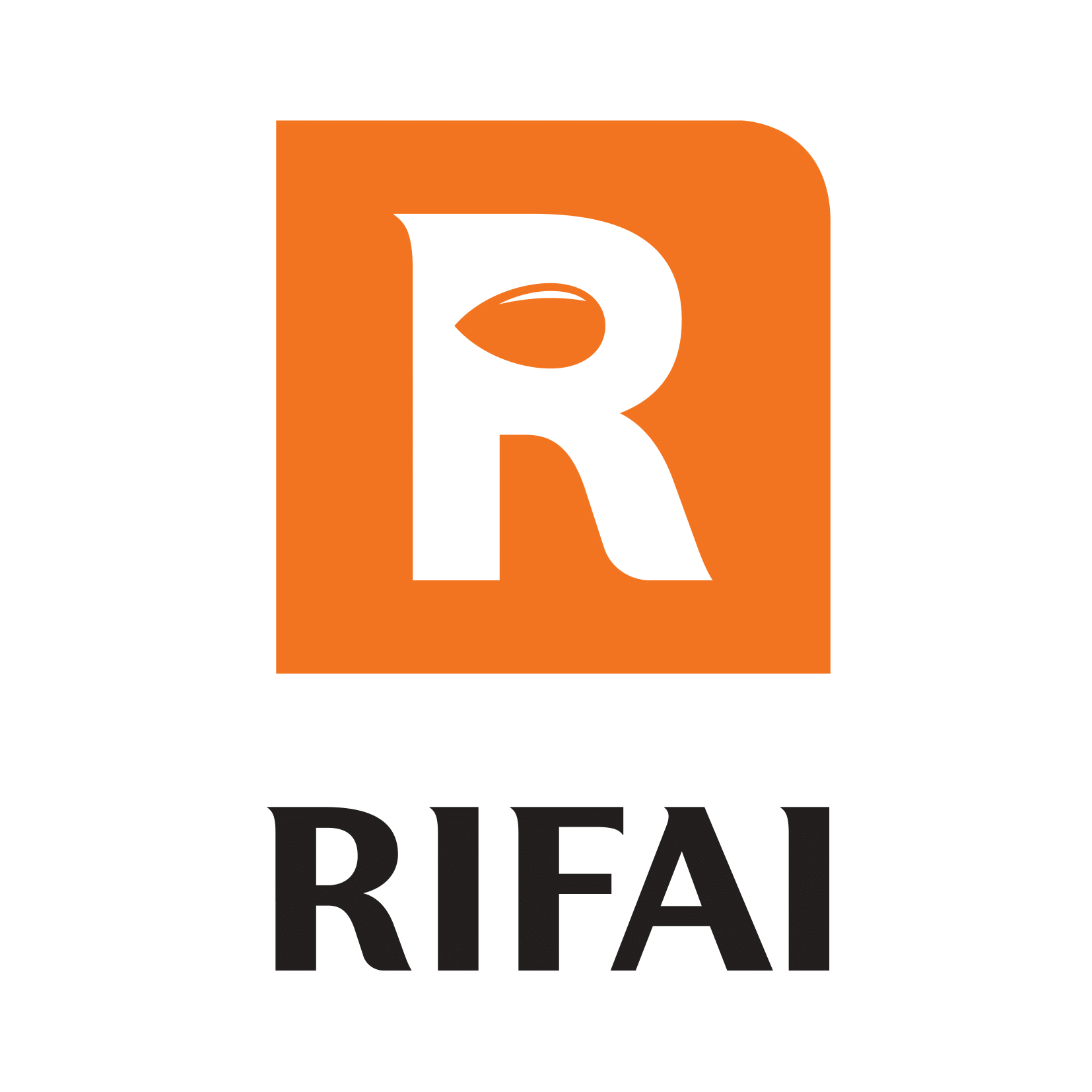
- Native name: ﺷﺮﻛﺔ اﻟﺮﻓﺎﻋﻲ اﻧﺘﺮﻧﺎﺷﻮﻧﺎل اﻟﻘﺎﺑﻀﺔ ﻟﻴﻤﺘﺪ
- Company type: Private
- Industry: Retail; FMCG
- Founded: 1948 in Beirut
- Headquarters: Beirut, Lebanon
- Area served: Worldwide (except MENA countries)
- Products: Nuts, kernels, coffee, confectionery, chocolates, gifting
- Owners: Merit Holding (2021–present)
- Subsidiaries: Alrifai Nutisal AB (2006–2013)
- Website: alrifai.com

Al Rifai is a Lebanese snack food company headquartered in Beirut, Lebanon. The company has 40 percent nuts market share in Lebanon and is the largest snacking nut retailer in the Middle East. Since 1996, Al Rifai has focused on international expansion while its Middle East business was franchised to Kuwait-based Kout Food Group.

== History ==
Rifai was founded in Beirut in 1948 as a home-based operation supplying roasted nuts and coffee to the local neighborhoods. In addition to its retail brand, Rifai wholesales nuts under other brands. In 1996 Al Homaizi Foodstuff Co. (Note: Now known as Kout Food Group.) of Kuwait acquired the rights to manufacture and sell Al Rifai products in the MENA region. In 2021, Merit, the holding company of the Saadé family, acquired 100 percent ownership of Rifai.

== Production ==
In July 2013 Alrifai opened a new plant in Halat with an annual capacity of 16,000 tons to consolidate all local production. It jointly owns facilities in Kuwait and Dubai with a local franchisee. Between 2006 and 2013, Alrifai owned a factory in Sweden under the name of Alrifai Nutisal AB, it sold its products in Sweden, Denmark, Norway, Germany, UK and the Benelux region. The factory was sold to local confectionery firm Cloetta in December 2013 for a reported $63 million.
