= Beirut International Center Production =

Lebanese film production company

- Founded: 2007; 19 years ago
- Headquarters: Lebanon
- Area served: MENA
- Key people: Bilal Zaarur (manager)
- Products: See filmography section
- Website: www.youtube.com/c/BICProduction

Beirut International Center Production (Arabic: مركز بيروت الدولي للإنتاج, abbreviated BIC Production) is a Lebanese film production company which produceds Lebanese and dubbed foreign works.

== Filmography ==
=== Film ===
Title	Year	Co-production(s)	Notes
Mawkib Al-Ebaa'	2005		
Tuff Incident	2007		
Khallet Warde	2011		
Princess of Rome	2015		Arabic version
Karun Treasure	2016		
Magic Bottle	2016		

=== Television series ===
Title	Year	Co-production(s)	Notes
Al Ghaliboun	2011-2012		
Qiyamat Al Banadiq	2013		
Daawat Moqawem	2014		
Darb Al-Yasamin	2015		

=== Dubbing ===
- Muhammad: The Messenger of God
- Mokhtarnameh
- Prophet Joseph
