= PSLab =

Lebanese lighting design company

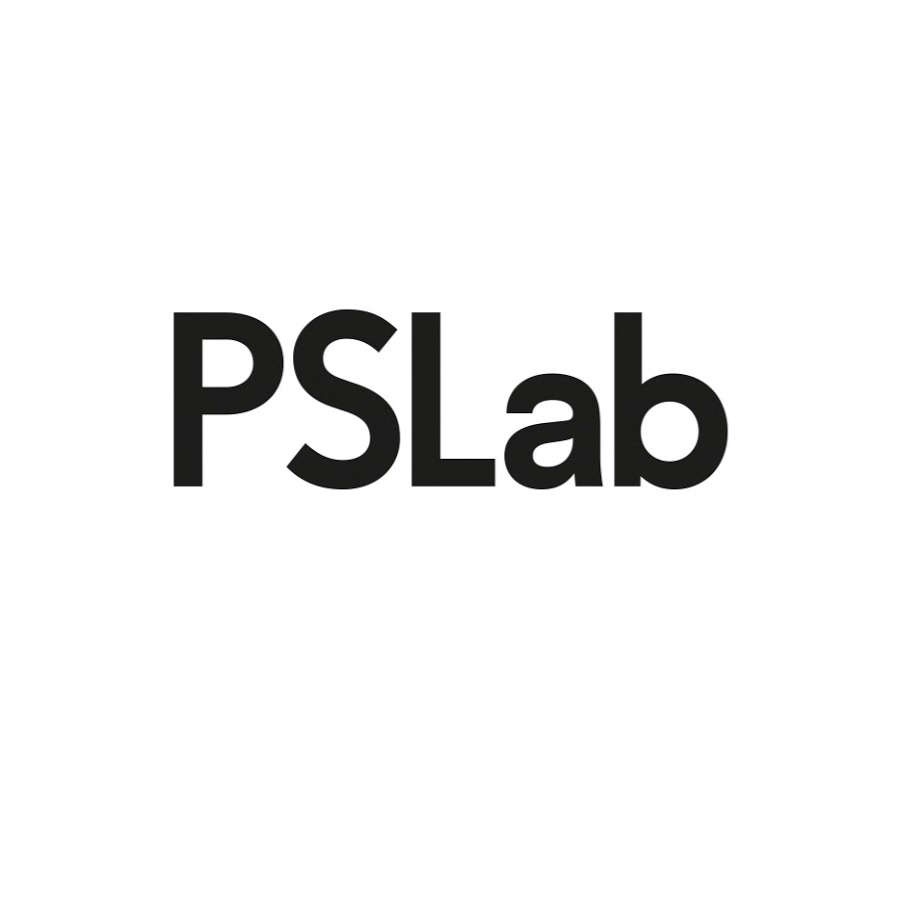
- Company type: Private
- Industry: Lighting design
- Founded: 2004
- Founder: Dimitri Saddi
- Headquarters: Beirut, Lebanon
- Website: pslab.net

PSLab is a lighting design company based in Beirut, Lebanon and has offices in several other countries. They design and build lighting fixtures for residential, commercial, and community spaces.

== History ==
PSLab was founded in 2004 by Dimitri Saddi, who is the Managing Director of the Company. The company grew out of Saddi’s family business. They have offices: in Stuttgart, Bologna, Dubai, Amsterdam, Antwerp, London and are opening in Copenhagen and Paris in 2019. Its headquarters is in the Mar Mikhayel neighborhood of Beirut, Lebanon.

== Design ==
PSLab are a team of architects, designers, engineers, craftsmen and technicians, who create original lighting designs for both commercial and residential complexes from scratch and from their archive. The designs include both technical designs and decorative lighting designed and built by PSLab with items being made by hand in their in house manufactory. Common materials used include aluminum, brass, copper, glass and blackened steel. PSLab has completed projects in Europe, Asia, and North America. The company has designed the lighting of hotels, as well as restaurants, retail stores, wellness centers, nightclub spaces, and outdoor community spaces. They also design the lighting for private residences.

== Awards ==
In 2011 the company received an iF Product Design Award, and they received a Good Design Award in both 2011 and 2013.
