= Société Bancaire du Liban =

Société Bancaire du Liban S.A.L.
- Native name: سوستيه بانكر دو لبنان
- Company type: Public
- Industry: Banking
- Founded: 1958
- Headquarters: Beirut, Lebanon
- Area served: Lebanon

Société Bancaire du Liban S.A.L. (Arabic: سوستيه بانكر دو لبنان)(former Banque Zilkha) was a Lebanese bank, founded in 1958, and headquartered in Sassine square, Achrafieh, Beirut. The bank was founded by the Bashi and Lawi families. On 31 December 2002, the bank merged into First National Bank SAL.

== See also ==
- Banque Zilkha
