= Banque Zilkha =

Lebanese bank

Banque Zilkha S.A.L.
- Native name: بنك زيلخا
- Company type: Private
- Industry: Banking
- Founded: 1946
- Headquarters: Beirut
- Area served: Lebanon

Banque Zilkha S.A.L. (Arabic: بنك زيلخا) was a Lebanese private bank, founded in 1946, and headquartered in Beirut. The bank was founded by the Zilkha family. Khedouri Zilkha (died 1956) was the head of the bank. In 1958, the bank merged into Société Bancaire du Liban S.A.L.
