= Société anonyme libanaise =

“Société anonyme libanaise,” abbreviated s.a.l., is the French term for a joint stock company in Lebanon. Its main characteristic is the intuitus pecuniae—the financial involvement of each associate.

A joint stock company is an association of funds contributed to by three or more persons. An s.a.l. must have at least three shareholders and capital of at least £L30,000,000. Ownership of shares in the company entitles the shareholder to membership in the company, a right to participate in management and a right to vote. These shares are negotiable or transferable. The liability of each shareholder is limited to the value of the shares held. The Board of Directors must set aside 10% of net profits to create a statutory reserve fund until such time as this reserve fund becomes equivalent to one-third of the capital of the company. A joint stock company must appoint an auditor.

Lebanese law does not provide for direct limitations on foreign interest in joint stock companies. The only indirect limitation is that the Board of Directors must have at least three Lebanese members out of the maximum twelve allowed. Another limitation is confined to joint stock companies whose object is the acquisition of and trading in real estate in Lebanon. In this case, 50 percent of the capital must be held by Lebanese nationals.

== See also ==
- Sàrl (Société à responsabilité limitée, or Limited Liability Company)
