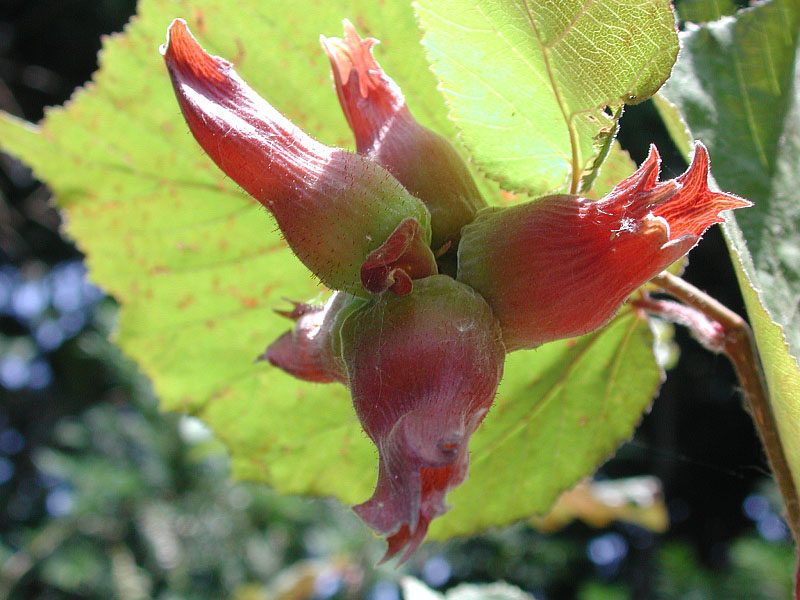
- Filbert fruit, showing the elongated tubular involucre

Conservation status
- Data Deficient (IUCN 3.1)

Scientific classification
- Kingdom: Plantae
- Clade: Tracheophytes
- Clade: Angiosperms
- Clade: Eudicots
- Clade: Rosids
- Order: Fagales
- Family: Betulaceae
- Genus: Corylus
- Species: C. maxima

Binomial name
- Corylus maxima Mill.

Synonyms
- Corylus arborescens G.Gaertn., B.Mey. & Scherb.; Corylus balcana P.D.Sell; Corylus balcana f. atropurpurea P.D.Sell; Corylus intermedia Fingerh.; Corylus sativa Poit. & Turpin; Corylus tubulosa Willd.

= Corylus maxima =

Filbert

Species of tree

Corylus maxima, the filbert, is a species of hazel in the birch family. It is native to Eurasia and produces an edible nut.

== Description ==
It is a deciduous shrub 6–10 metres (20–33 feet) tall, with stems up to 20 centimetres (8 inches) thick. The leaves are rounded, 5–12 cm (2–4 3/4 in) long by 4–10 cm (1 1/2–4 in) broad, with a coarsely double-serrated margin.

The flowers are wind-pollinated catkins produced in late winter. The male (pollen) catkins are pale yellow, 5–10 cm (2–4 in) long, while the female catkins are bright red and only 1–3 mm (1/16–1/8 in) long. The fruit is a nut produced in clusters of 1–5 together. Each nut is 1.5–2.5 cm (1/2–1 in) long, fully enclosed in a 3–5 cm (1 1/4–2 in) long, tubular involucre (husk).

=== Similar species ===
The filbert is similar to the related common hazel, C. avellana, differing in having the nut more fully enclosed by the tubular involucre. This feature is shared by the beaked hazel C. cornuta of North America, and the Asian beaked hazel C. sieboldiana of eastern Asia.

== Distribution and habitat ==
The species is native to southeastern Europe and southwestern Asia, from the Balkans to Turkey.

== Uses ==
The purple-leaved cultivar C. maxima 'Purpurea' is a popular ornamental shrub in gardens.

The filbert nut is edible and is very similar to the hazelnut (cobnut). Its main use in the United States is as large filler (along with peanuts as small filler) in most containers of mixed nuts. Filberts are sometimes grown in orchards for the nuts, but much less often than the common hazel.

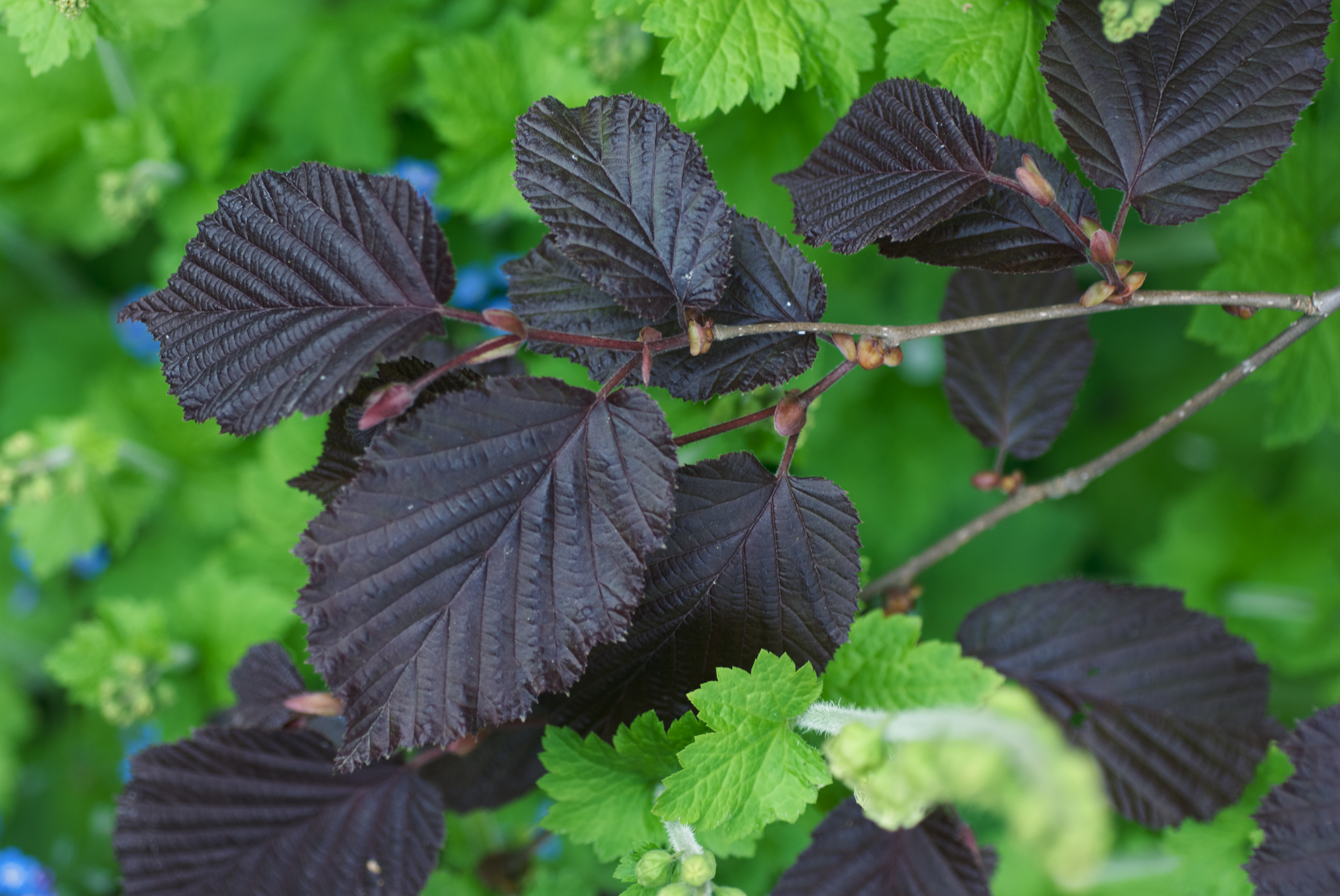
C. maxima 'Purpurea'

== Name ==
The etymology for 'filbert' may trace to Norman French. Saint Philibert's feast day is 20 August (old style) and the plant was possibly renamed after him because the nuts were mature on this day.

In Oregon, "filbert" was used for commercial hazelnuts in general. Use in this manner has faded partly due to the efforts of Oregon's hazelnut growers to brand their product to better appeal to global markets and avoid confusion.
