= Al-Mal News =

- Format: Daily then weekly
- Editor: Hazem Sharif
- Founded: 2002
- Language: Arabic
- Headquarters: Dokki, Giza, Egypt
- Website: almalnews.com

Al-Mal News (Arabic: جريدة المال, lit. “The Money News”) is a daily Egyptian newspaper focused on the economy. It covers the stock market, corporations, the economy of Egypt, retail, banking, insurance, transportation, investment, information and communications technology, and some political and other news.

Al-Mal was founded as an independent weekly paper on August 18, 2002, but its first issue came out on March 16, 2003. On January 14, 2008, it converted to daily publication. Al-Mal News is the largest provider of business journalism in Egypt, employing 130 journalists, developers, designers, and experts across a broad range of print and online platforms and across social media 24/7.

== History ==
The original publication staff started planning their independent economic newspaper at a meeting on August 18, 2002. The first weekly issue came out on March 16, 2003, introducing unique platform for corporate and bank news, currency and exchange rates, and prices of stock, real estate, gold, vegetables, and fruits around the world.

At the end of 2005, Al-Mal Conferences was set up as a seminar branch. A year later, Al-Mal was the subject of the first leveraged buyout in the history of regional journalism when Al Arabiya’s and publisher Dar Al-Tanweer acquired a majority stake. The first daily issue came out on January 14, 2008.

In late 2012, Al Mal acquired the GTM conference management firm, creating the Al Mal-GTM brand that is now wholly owned by the paper. That year, Al Mal also partnered with the business news show “Mal Masr” featured by On E, and when the show was cancelled, Al Mal took over the trademark.

== Staff and activities ==
Al Mal has over 230 employees, including the technical, production, and editorial staff; the marketing and advertising departments; subscriptions; distribution; human resources; and financial affairs. Many are now in leading positions in many publications, websites, and specialized agencies both at home and abroad.

The newspaper also participates in charity work. In 2013, for instance, it donated a free advertisement for the Children's Cancer Hospital Egypt.
