= Borg El Arab University Hospital =

Coordinates: 30.8739°N 29.5794°E

- Alexandria University Hospitals
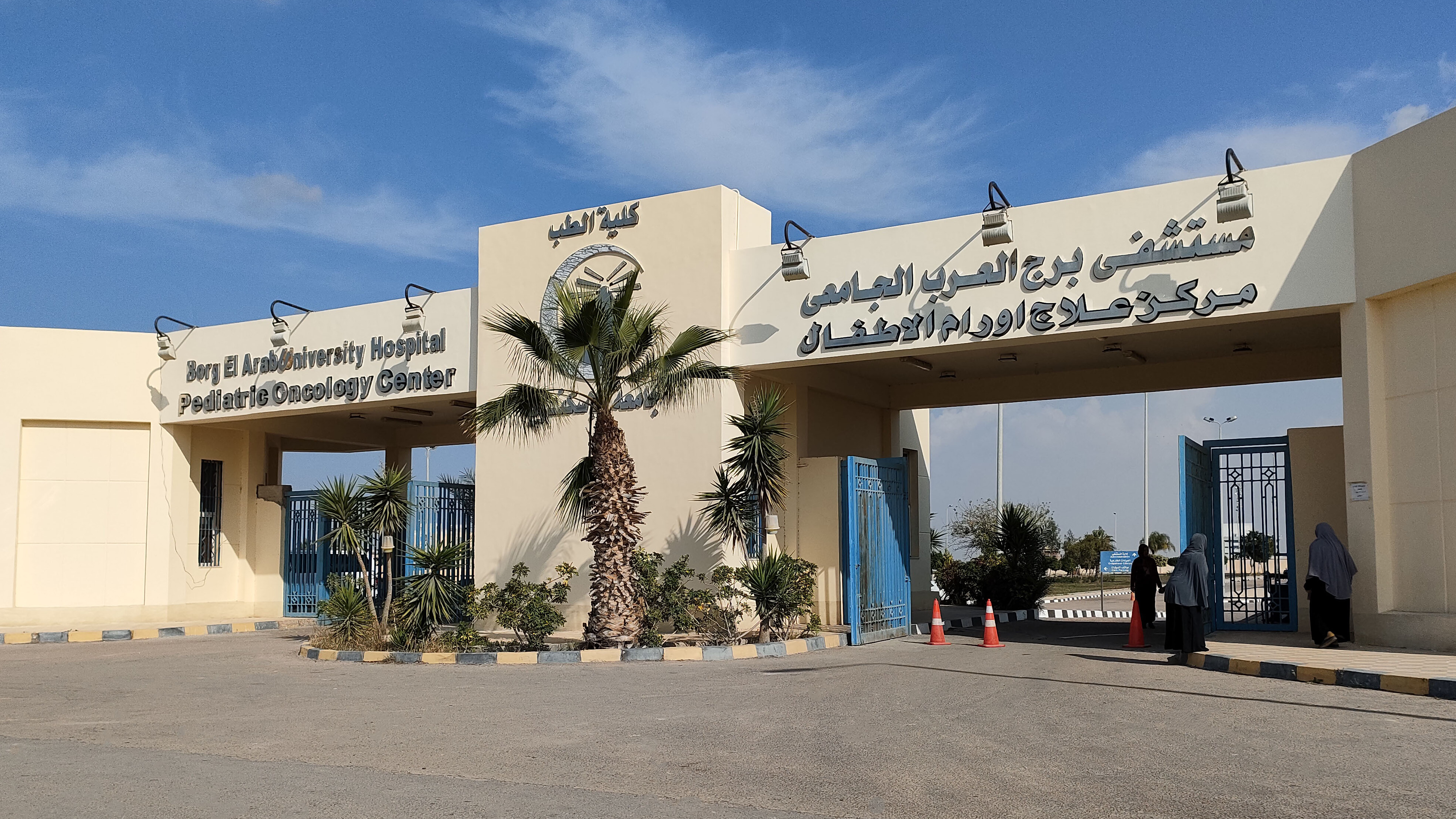
- Pediatric Oncology Center gate

Geography
- Location: New Borg El Arab, Alexandria Governorate, Egypt

Organisation
- Care system: Ministry of Higher Education (Egypt)
- Type: Teaching hospital
- Affiliated university: Faculty of Medicine, Alexandria University.

Services
- Beds: 80

History
- Opened: 2008

Borg El Arab University Hospital (Arabic: مستشفي برج العرب الجامعي) is a teaching hospital One of Alexandria University Hospitals, its included on the first governmental center specialized in treating children cancer free of charge in Egypt. It was established in 2008 as a result of a cooperation concluded between the Egyptian and Dutch government as a university hospital It located in the central axis area in New Borg El Arab city in Alexandria Governorate, northern Egypt, on an area of 107 acres. The hospital provides its services mainly to residents of the governorates of Alexandria, Kafr El Sheikh, Beheira, and Matrouh.

== Departments and specializations ==
=== Pediatric Oncology Center ===
Pediatric Oncology Center was established in 2018 as hospital specializing in the treatment of children's cancer, led by Doctor Shady Fadel, the professor of Oncology at Alexandria University. The Center in the first phase consists of a main building on an area of 5 acres, consisting of four floors; The first floor for surgery, the second for hematology, the third for solid tumors, and the fourth for one-day treatment. The cost of establishing the first stage was about E£350 million.

The hospital has a capacity of about 80 patient beds, 10 beds for intensive care, and 5 operating rooms. Since its conversion into a hospital specializing in the treatment of children's cancer, the hospital has received about 4,900 children with cancer until the end of 2020, with an average of about 1,600 children annually.

During the same period, 60 surgeries were performed per month. Work is currently underway to establish a radiotherapy center equipped with the latest equipment. In the second phase, 2 additional buildings will be constructed as expansions for the Children's Cancer Hospital, as well as a Cancer Research Center, an educational school, and an adult cancer hospital. With a capacity of 200 beds.

=== Outpatient surgery ===
The hospital includes many other medical specialties other than oncology, which are cardiology, brain and nerves, gynecology and obstetrics, ophthalmology, pediatrics, internal medicine, nutrition, ear, nose and throat, dentistry, surgery, physical therapy, dialysis units, and orthopedics, in addition to three Specialized laboratories are the clinical pathology lab, the microbiology lab, and the pathology lab, and it also includes a blood bank.

== Photo gallery ==
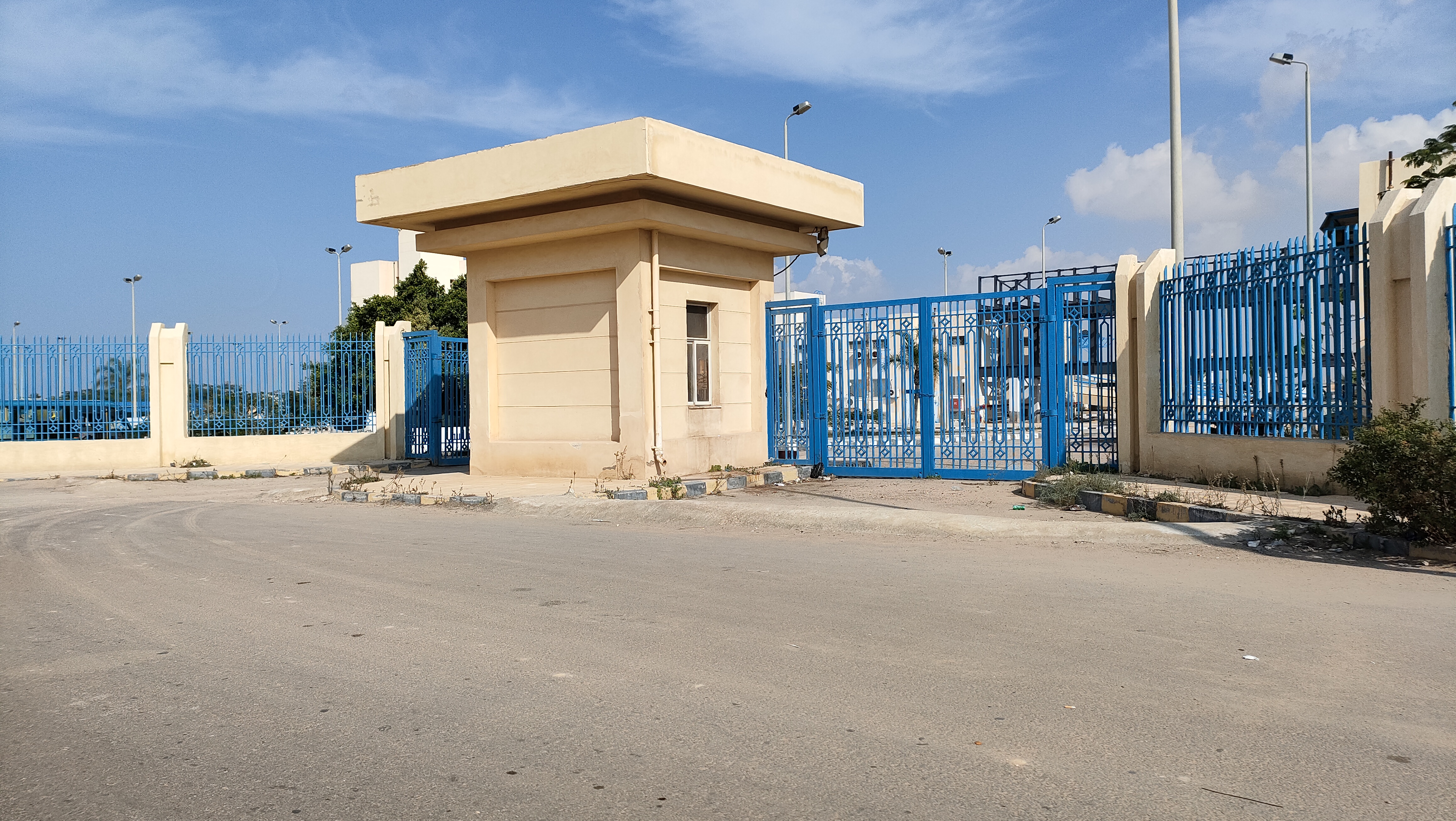

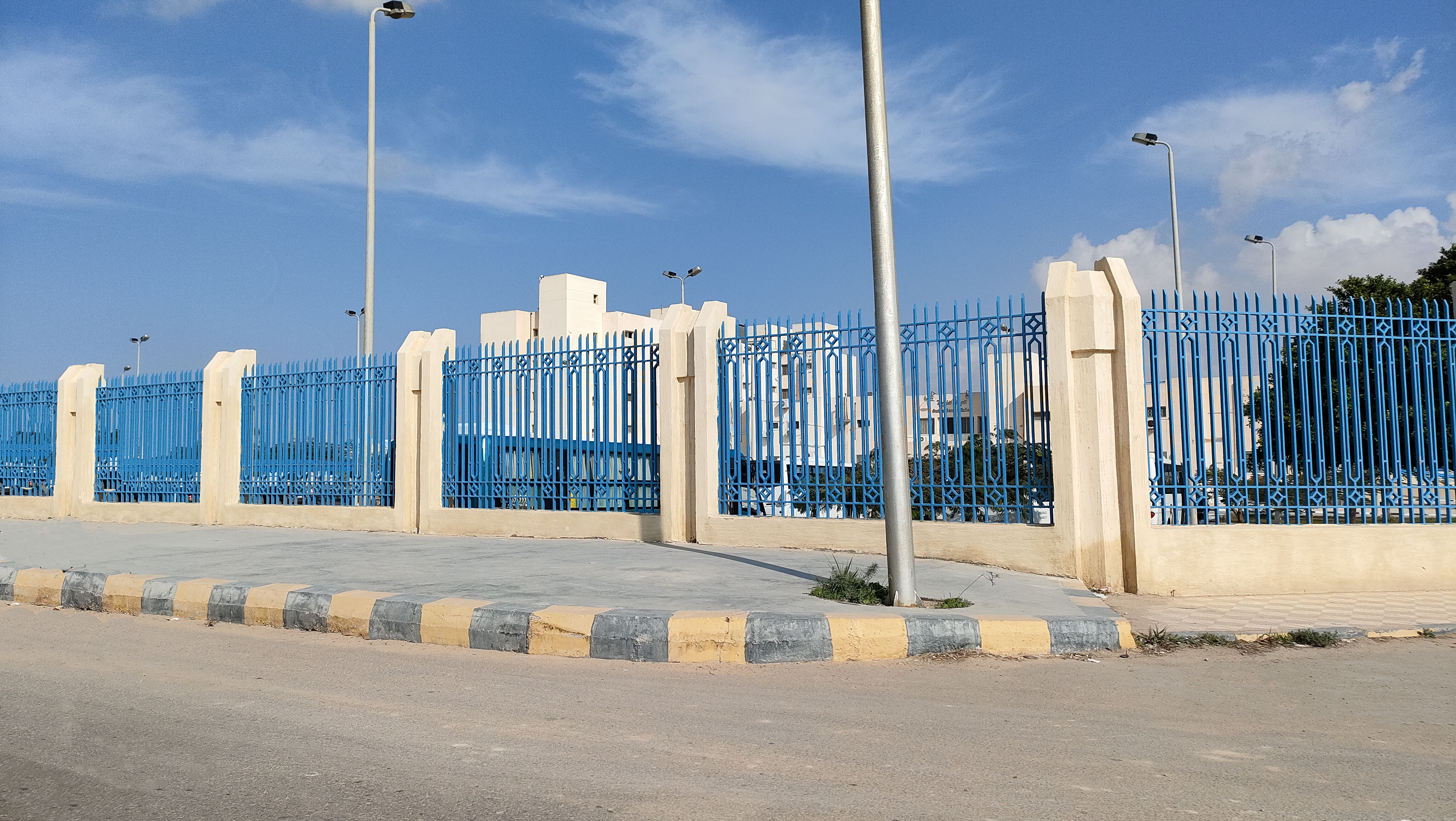

== See also ==
- Children's Cancer Hospital Egypt
- National Cancer Institute (Egypt)
- Al Hadra University Hospital
