= City of Scientific Research and Technological Applications =

Egyptian research institution

- مدينة الأبحاث العلمية والتطبيقات التكنولوجية
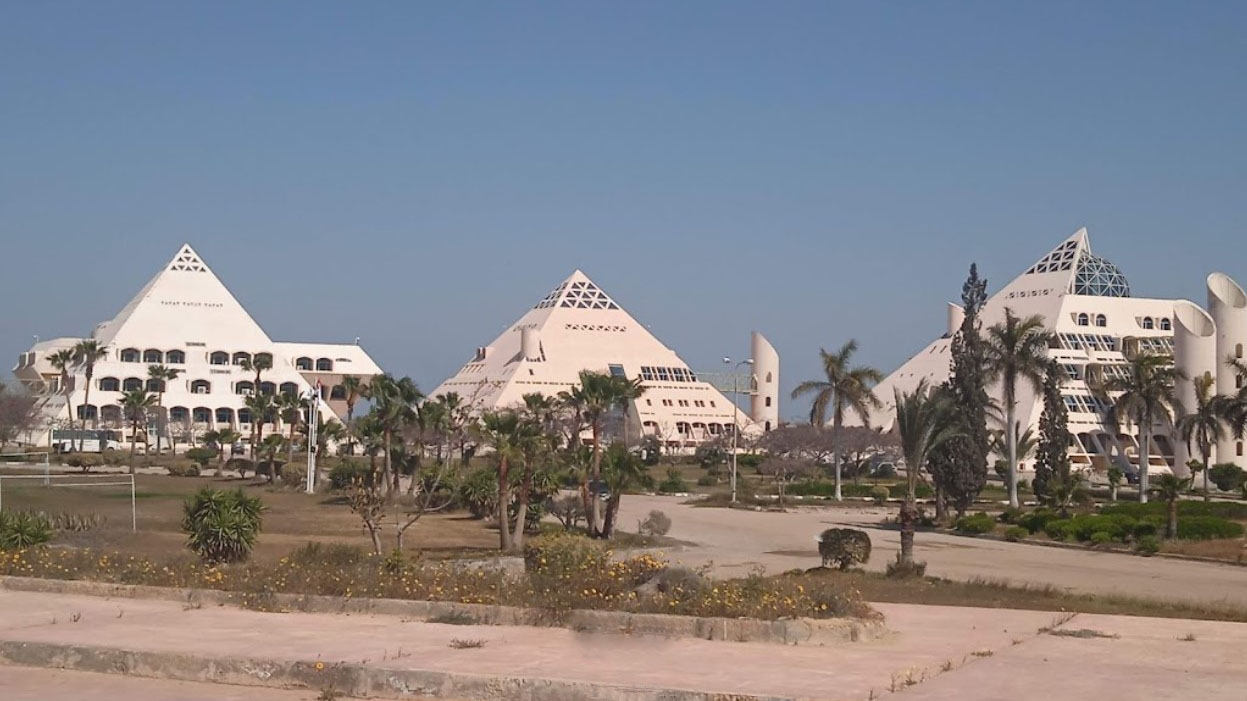
- Other names: SRTA-City
- Type: Research institute
- Established: 2000; 26 years ago
- President: Mona Abdel Latif
- Location: New Borg El Arab, Alexandria Governorate, Egypt
- Website: srtacity.sci.eg

The City of Scientific Research and Technological Applications (SRTA-City) (Arabic: مدينة الأبحاث العلمية والتطبيقات التكنولوجية) is an Egyptian research institution, established by the 1993 Presidential Decree No. 85 and opened on 13 August 2000 to develop scientific technologies in the various industrial and research fields.

The City was established within New Borg El Arab city in Alexandria Governorate on an area of 225 acre, chosen for being one of the major industrial areas in Egypt, containing five industrial zones with more than 1,300 factories in various activities.

About 464 people are employed in the City, including 185 researchers in various scientific disciplines. The City has published about 500 research papers in internationally indexed journals. It has also obtained 19 international patents, 30 patents under arbitration, and 13 researchers have received scientific awards in various disciplines.

== History ==
The idea of establishing a science and technology research centre dates back to 1989. A study about the required costs, funding sources, architectural designs, setting administrative, and technical and financial regulations was published in October 1992. An area of 100 acres [CONVERT] was later allocated in the university area of New Borg El Arab city in Alexandria Governorate. On 4 March 1993, Presidential Decree No. 85 was issued to establish a public scientific authority under the name of Mubarak City for Scientific Research and Technological Applications. The city was officially opened on 13 August 2000, and Abdel Moneim Hammouda was appointed as the first director of the city. During its first phase, 200 research assistant and teachers were appointed.

On 11 September 2000, Presidential Decree No. 372 was issued to increase the area allocated to the city to 225 acres. On 23 May 2005, Presidential Decree No. 147 was issued to issue the city's executive regulations, which organize financial, administrative and technical affairs. On 7 September 2009, Prime Minister Decree No. 2320 was issued to establish an investment zone with an area of 135 acres within the city's scope to work in the fields of biotechnology, nanotechnology, and information technology. On 9 May 2011, after the January 25 Revolution, the Supreme Council of the Armed Forces’ decision No. 85 was issued to rename it the City of Scientific Research and Technological Applications, and in 2015, a Presidential Decree was issued (Cabinet No. 332) with the final approval of the planning and division of the plot of land allocated.

== Objectives ==
- The city was established to achieve several objectives, the most important of which are:
- Working to encourage scientific research in the areas related to the development plans of the state and to find solutions to the problems of the industrial society.
- Strengthening scientific cooperation between the city and research centers and local and foreign universities for the transfer, settlement and development of technology.
- Create an attractive environment for inventors and prototype owners to nurture and develop them.
- Establishing companies based on research and development with researchers in the investment zone of the authority to reach final products.
- Supporting technical education and training in particular to raise the capabilities of young people to qualify them to join the labor market.

== Research centres ==
The science park of SRTA-City hosts the following research institutes:

- Genetic Engineering and Biotechnology Research Institute
- Informatics Research Institute
- Advanced Technology and New Materials Research Institute
- Arid Lands Cultivation Research Institute
- Environmental Research and Natural Resources Institute

== Photo gallery ==
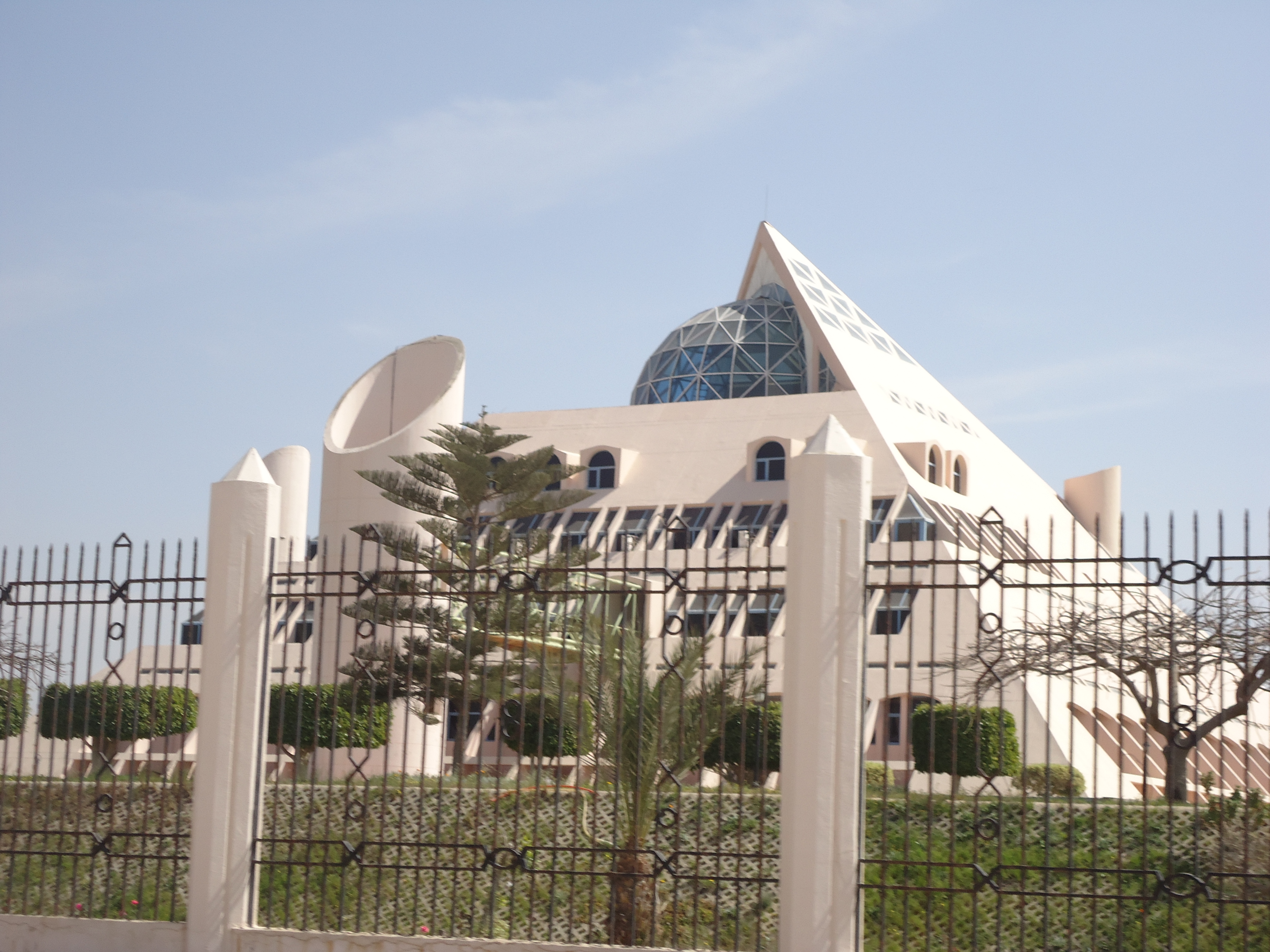

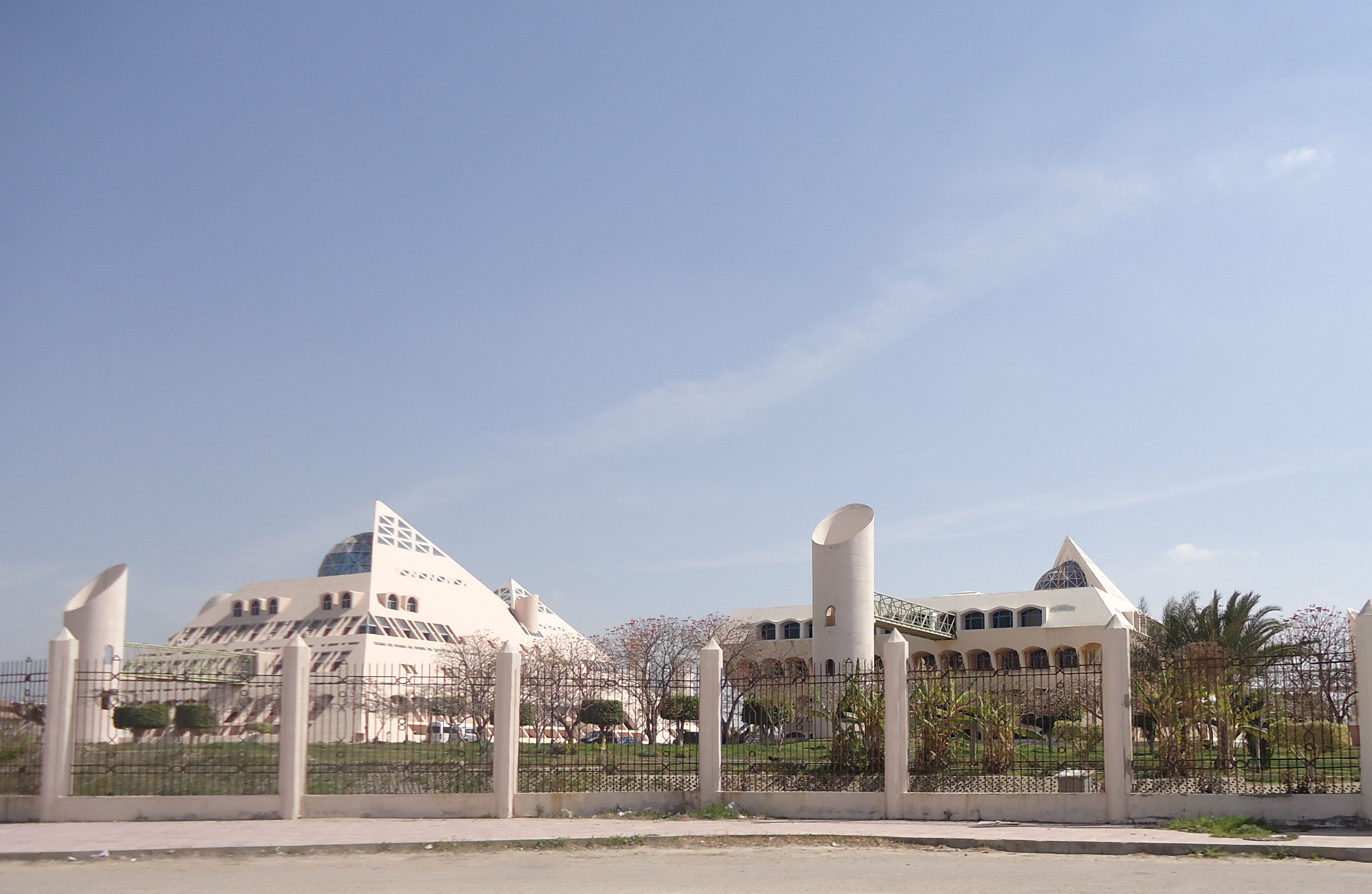

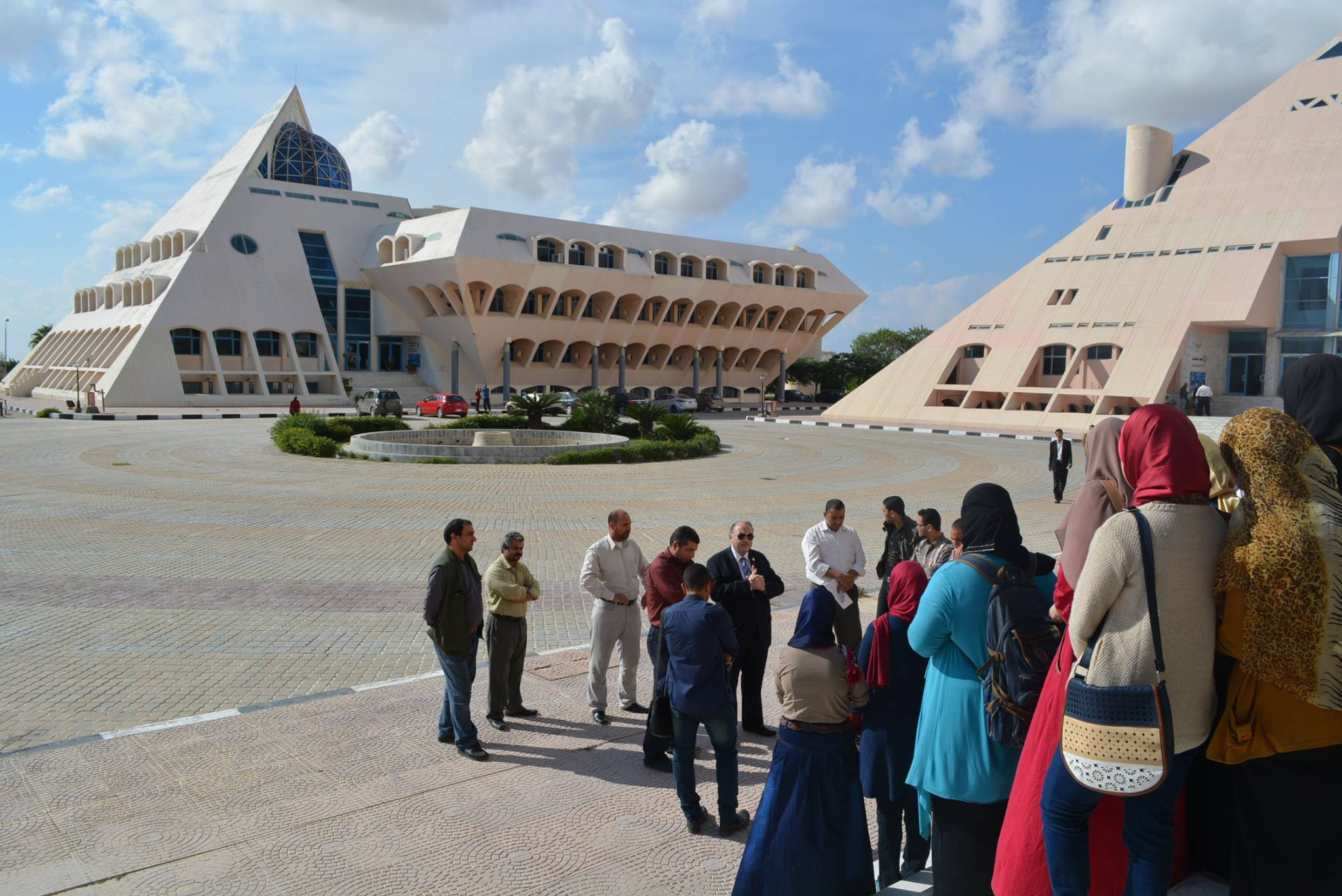

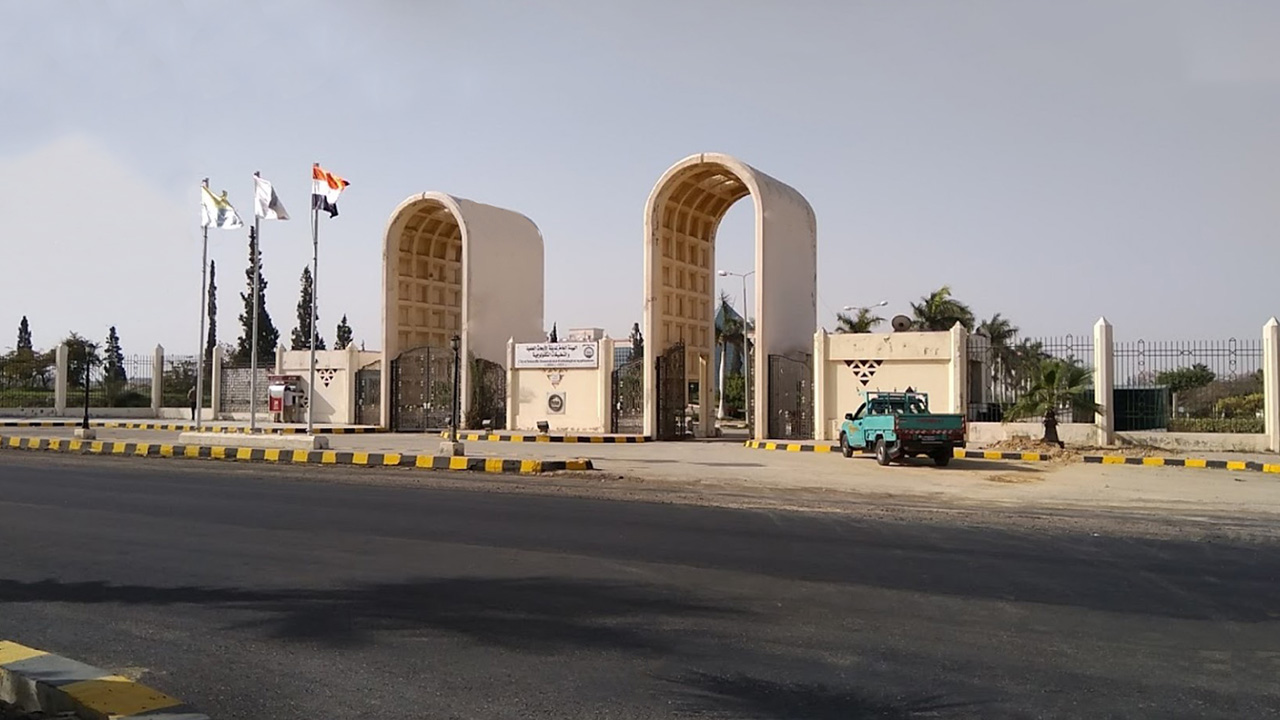

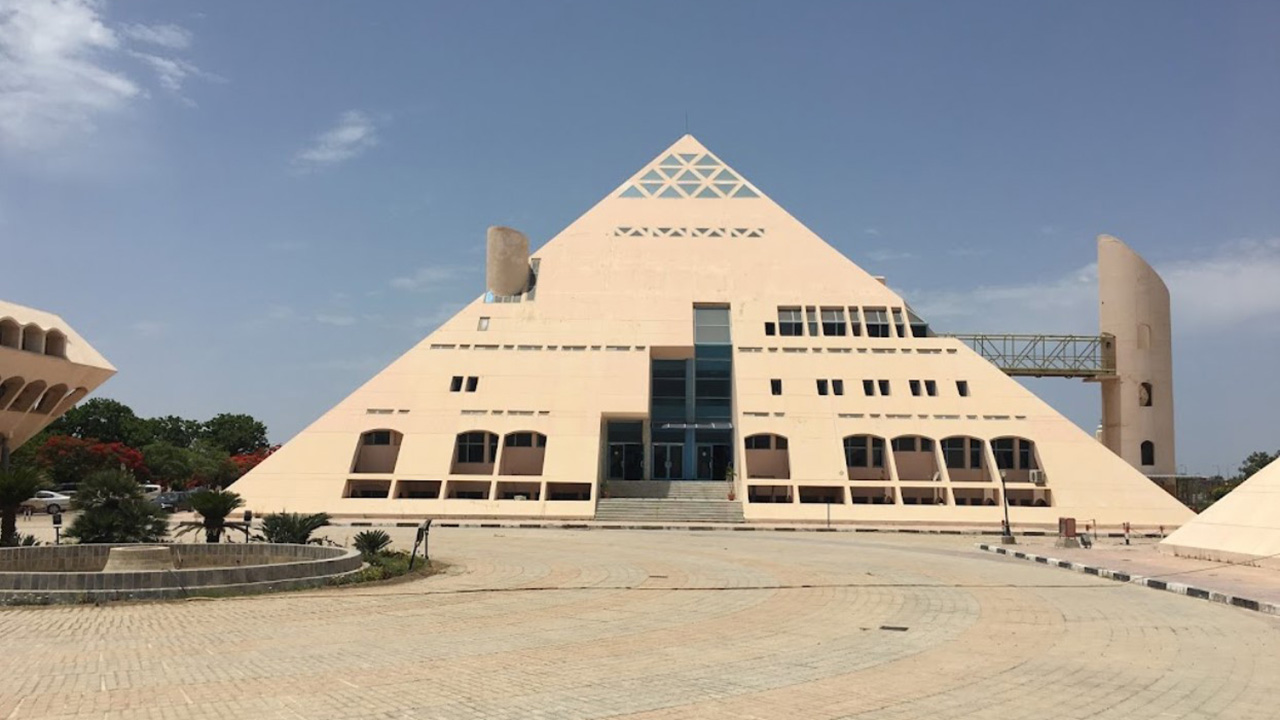

== See also ==
- Zewail City of Science, Technology and Innovation
- Egypt-Japan University of Science and Technology
- Borg El Arab Technological University
