= Egypt-Japan University of Science and Technology =

University in Alexandria, Egypt

Coordinates: 30.8682°N 29.5827°E

- エジプト日本科学技術大学 الجامعة المصرية اليابانية للعلوم والتكنولوجيا
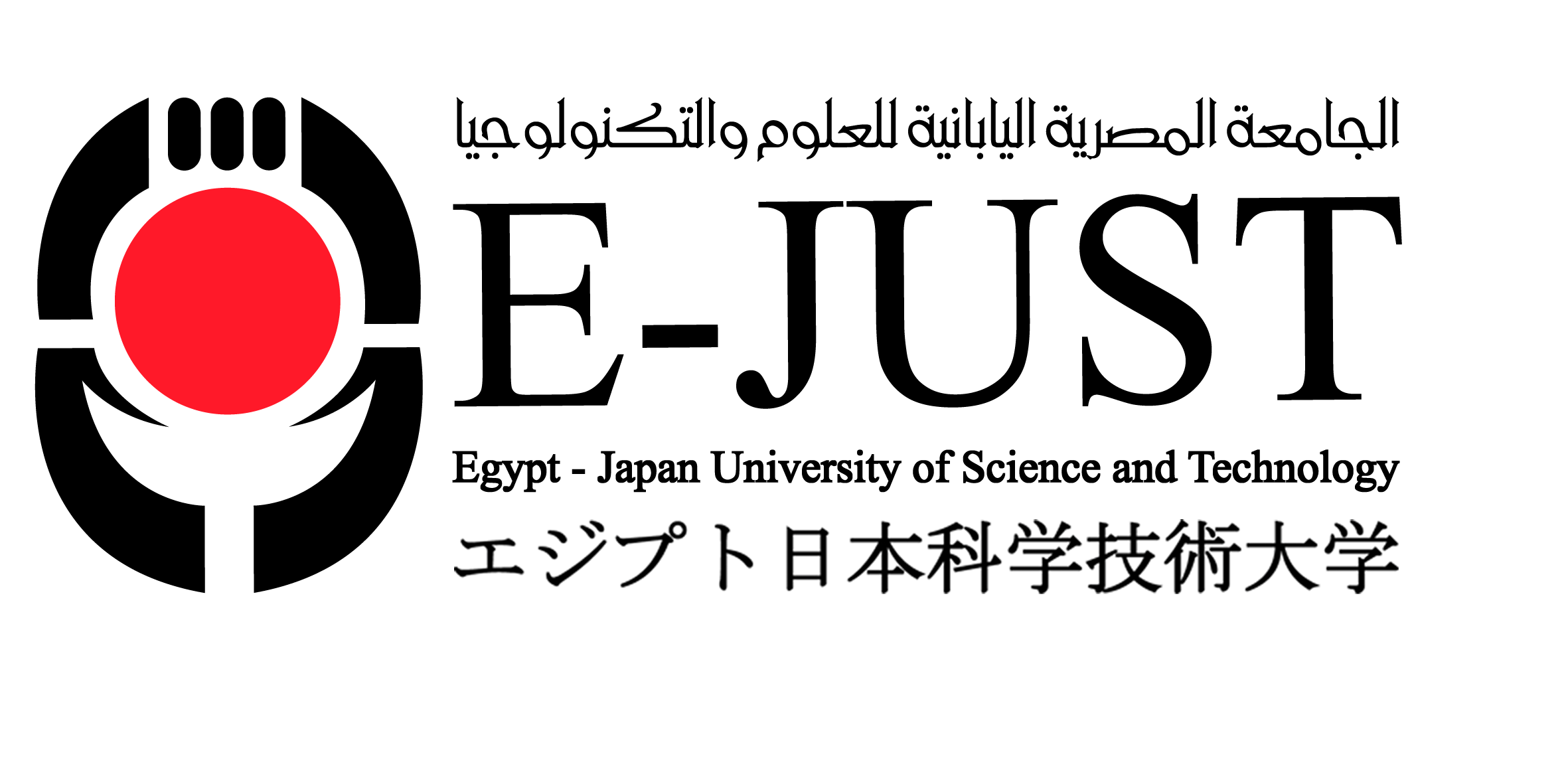
- Type: National university
- Established: 2009; 17 years ago
- President: Amr Adly
- Location: New Borg El Arab, Alexandria Governorate, 21934, Egypt
- Language: English
- Website: ejust.edu.eg

Egypt-Japan University of Science and Technology (E-JUST, Arabic: الجامعة المصرية اليابانية للعلوم والتكنولوجيا Al-Gāmi`ah al-Miṣriyyah al-Yabāniyyah lil-`Ulūm wal-Tiknūlūjiyā, Japanese: エジプト日本科学技術大学 Ejiputo Nihon Kagaku Gijutsu Daigaku) is an Egyptian research university with a Japanese partnership, established by Presidential Decree No. 149 of 2009 as a university based on scientific research and diversified education.

By strengthening ties and cooperation between Egyptian and Japanese academic institutions, as well as industrial companies, E-JUST conducts state-of-the-art research with the application of Japanese educational standards, policies and systems, and uses the latest Japanese technologies and systems in its teaching and research.

The Egypt-Japan University of Science and Technology (E-JUST) is located in New Borg El Arab city in Alexandria Governorate. The city was chosen as one of the major industrial areas in Egypt, which contains five diverse industrial zones, has more than 1,300 industrial and production facilities, and attracts a large number of international investments; The temporary headquarters of the university and the university housing are currently located in the third district of New Borg El Arab city until it is moved to its new headquarters in the universities area on an area of 200 acres, once all the construction, laboratories and infrastructure of the university, which is estimated at a cost of about 3.75 billion Egyptian pounds, was inaugurated. The first phase of it is in September 2020.

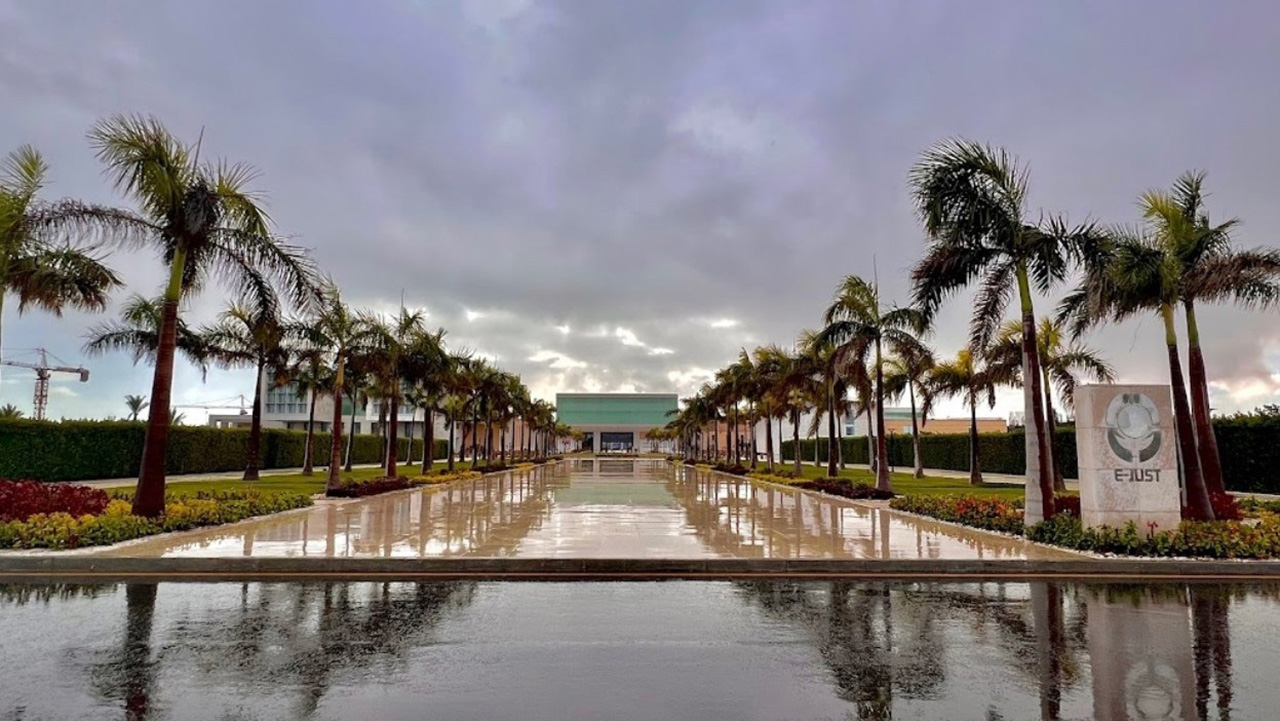
University entrance

== Objectives ==
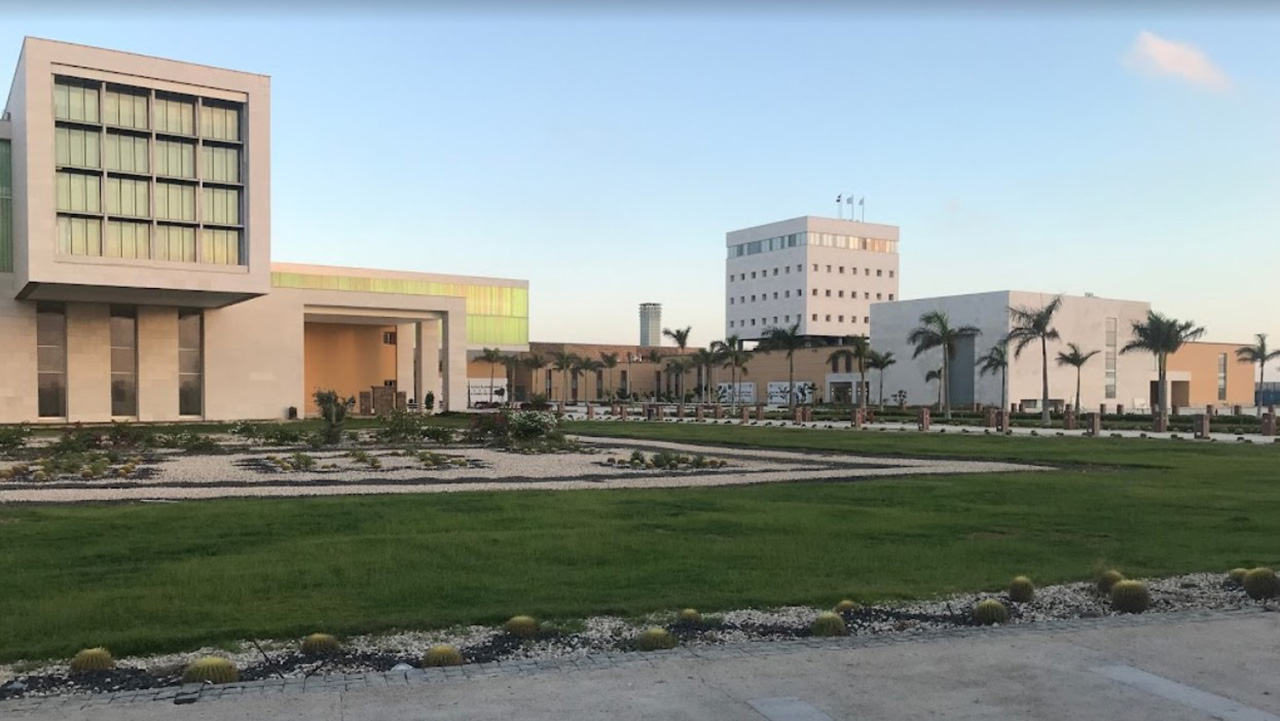
The new headquarters

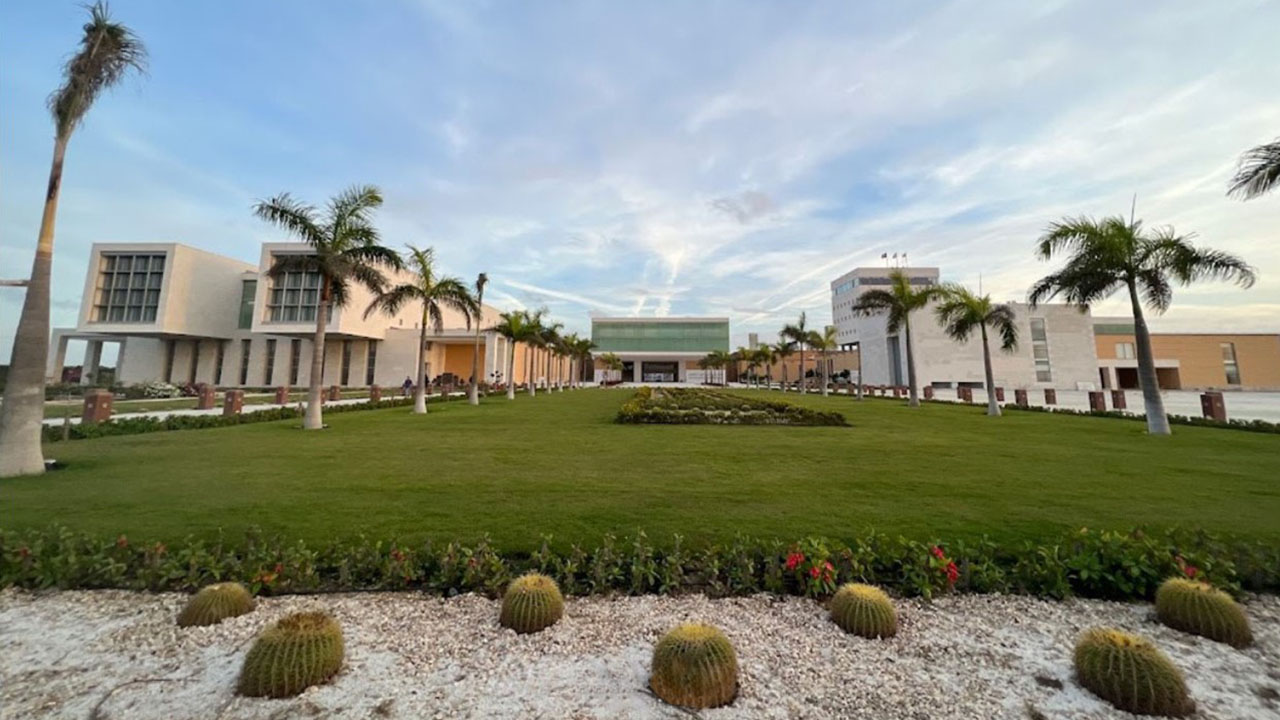
The new headquarters

The Egyptian-Japanese University was established to achieve several objectives, the most important of which are:

- Establishing a new model for a pioneering Egyptian university based on the effective partnership between Egypt and Japan.
- Follow the Japanese model of innovative education based on scientific research, practical application and problem-solving methodology.
- To be a first-class research university according to international standards (40% of its students are from graduate studies and advanced research)
- It contains several Centers of Excellence based on the elements of innovation and creativity and embodying the new model of universities in the twenty-first century.
- The methods of competition with the world's major universities are based on advanced education and scientific research.
- It is unique in academic disciplines that interact with all production and service sectors and is interested in scientific fields with complex specializations and depends on the extensive use of communication technology and information systems.
- It aims to serve human development in Egypt, the Arab region and Africa.
- It aims to attract Japanese companies and organizations to cooperate with them in research and to use the capabilities of these companies in training and transfer of new technologies and advanced work methods to Egypt.

== Rankings ==
E-JUST Rankings according to the Times Higher Education World University Rankings: Year / THE World University Rankings / THE Impact Rankings / Egypt Rank; 2024 / 601–800th / --- / 1st; 2023 / Reporter / 401–600th / 9th
Year
Egypt rank
Middle East & North Africa rank
2022
4th
22nd
2021
2nd
11th

== Faculties ==
E-JUST has up to 7 schools/faculties offering specialized programs in Bachelor's, Master's, and Doctorate degrees, as well as discipline-tailored Diplomas.

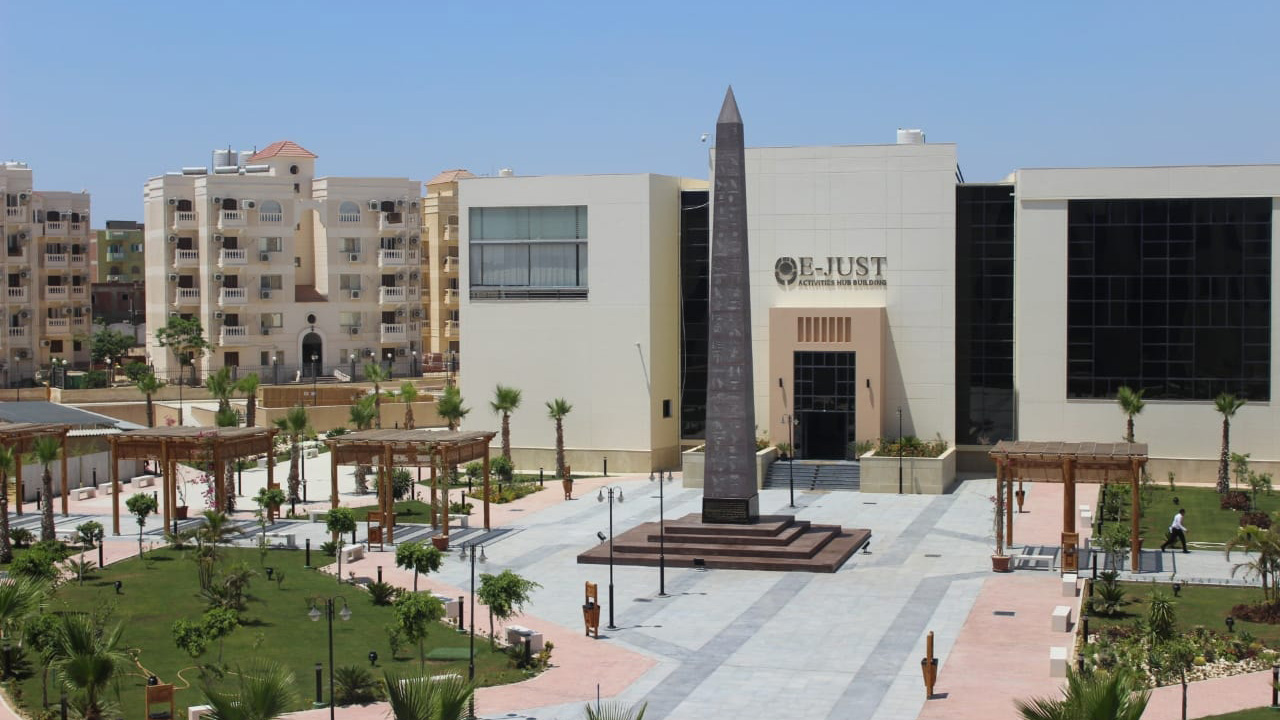
The temporary headquarters

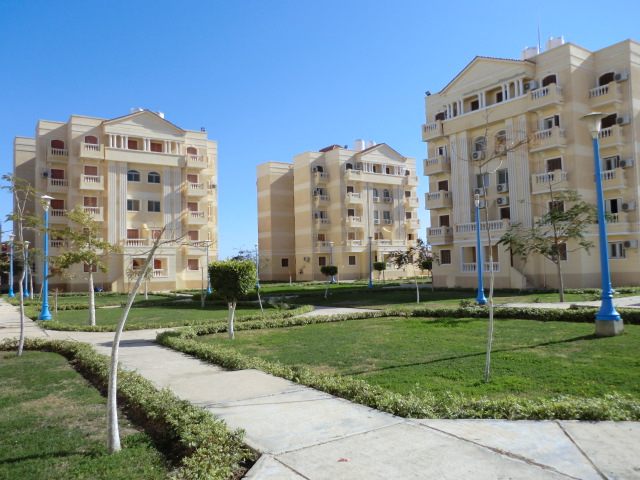
University housing

* Faculty of Engineering: The Faculty offers the following programs:

- School of Electronics, Communications and Computer Engineering (ECCE):
  - Electrical Power Engineering Program.
  - Electronics & Communications Engineering Program.
  - Computer Science & Engineering Program.
  - Biomedical & Bioinformatics Engineering Program.
- School of Innovative Design Engineering (IDE):
  - Industrial & Manufacturing Engineering Program.
  - Mechatronics and Robotics Engineering Program.
  - Materials Science & Engineering Program.
- School of Energy, Environment, Chemicals and Petrochemicals Engineering (EECE):
  - Chemicals and Petrochemicals Engineering Program.
  - Energy Resources Engineering Program.
  - Environmental Engineering Program.

* School of Basic and Applied Sciences.

* Faculty of International Business and Humanities.

* Faculty of Pharmacy.

* Faculty of Computer Science and Information Technology.

* Faculty of Arts and Design.

== Photo gallery ==
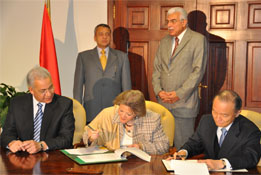
Signing the bilateral agreement between Egypt and Japan for establishing The university

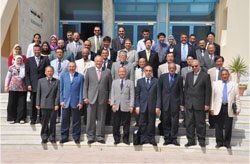
E-JUST Soft Opening

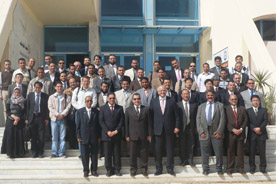
E-JUST Soft Opening

== See also ==
- List of universities in Egypt.
- Japanese people in Egypt.
- Borg El Arab Technological University.
- City of Scientific Research and Technological Applications.
- Education in Egypt
