= New Borg El Arab =

City in Alexandria governorate, Egypt

New Borg El Arab برج العرب الجديده Borg Elarab Elgedida
- City
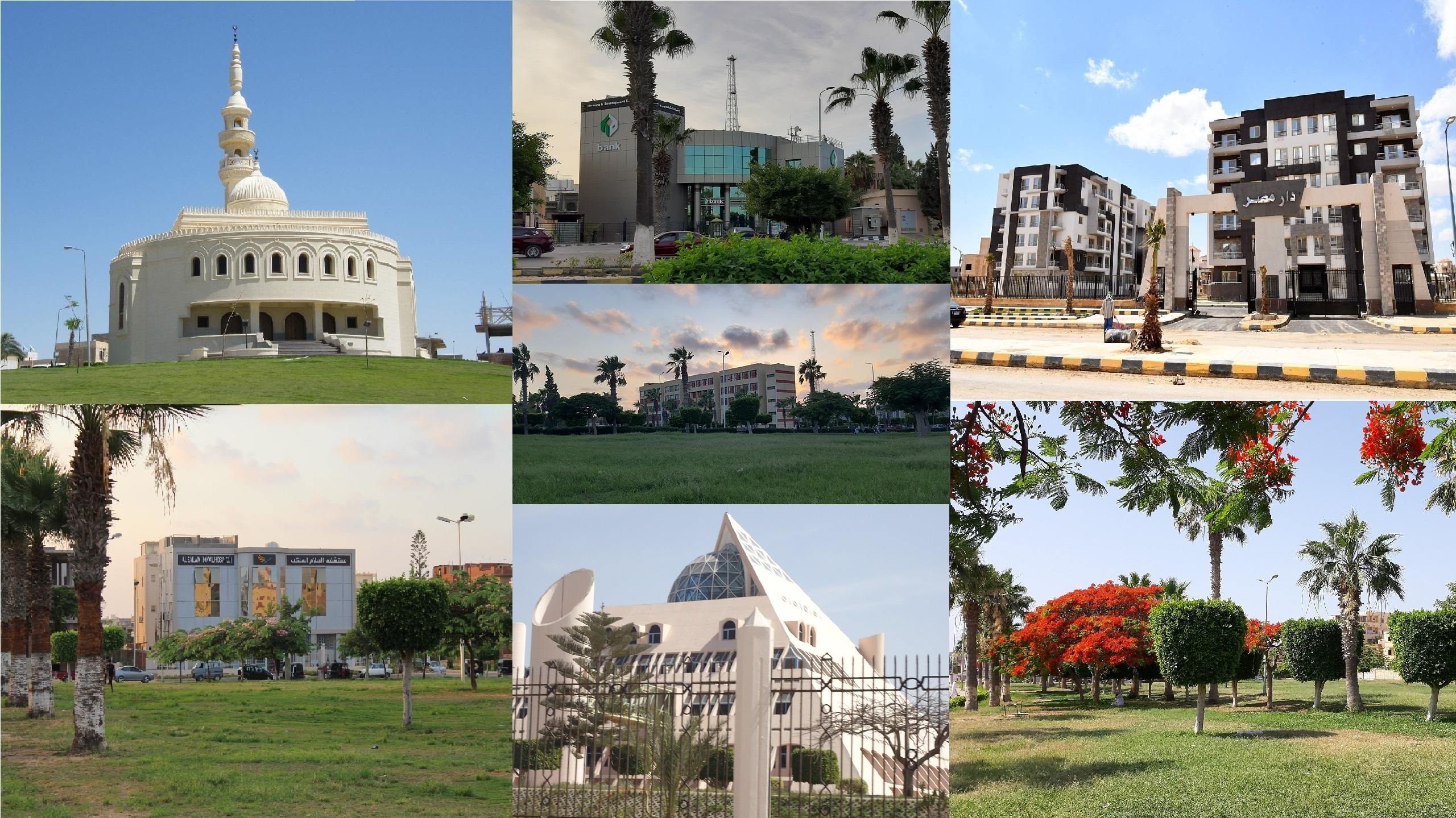
- Some of the city's landmarks

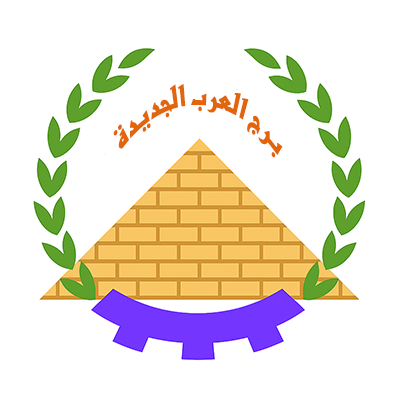
- Emblem

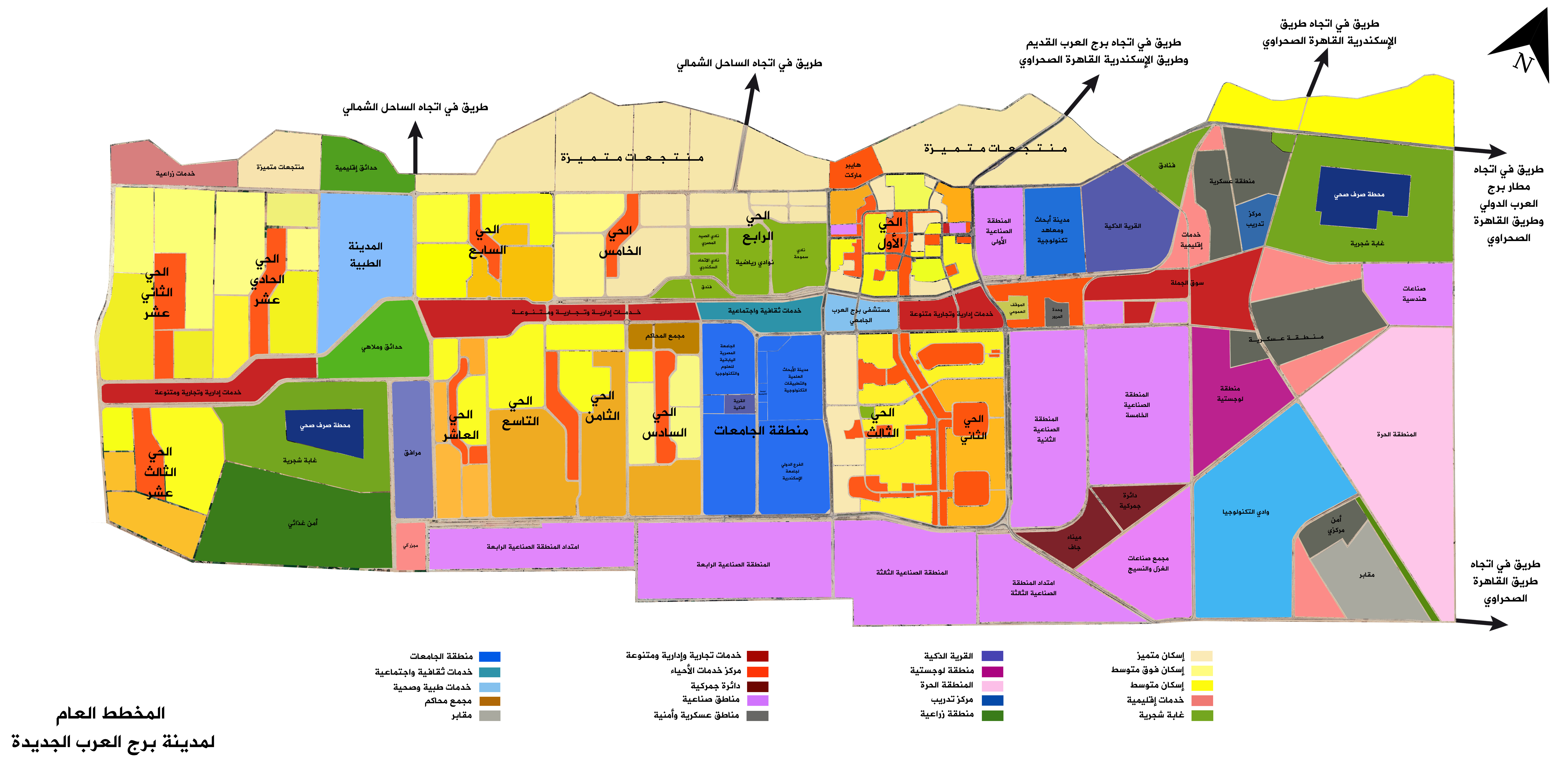
- Map

- Location in Egypt
- Coordinates: 30°50′56″N 29°36′42″E
- Country: Egypt
- Governorate: Alexandria
- Founded: 1979

Government
  - Head of city Authority: El Sayed Hammam

Area
  - Total: 165.9 km^{2} (64.1 sq mi)
- Elevation: 28 m (92 ft)

Population (2021)
  - Total: 45,865
  - Density: 276.5/km^{2} (716.0/sq mi)
- Time zone: UTC+2 (EET)
  - Summer (DST): UTC+3 (EEST)
- Post code: 21934
- Area code: (+20) 3
- Website: New Borg El Arab Authority

New Borg El Arab (Egyptian Arabic: برج العرب الجديده, Borg el-ʿArab el-Gedīda) is a city in Alexandria Governorate, Egypt. It is a new city of the first generation, located and administratively affiliated to the New Urban Communities Authority. It was established by decree of the President of the Arab Republic of Egypt No. 506 dated December 5, 1979 under the name "New Amria City".

The city retained its original name until the decision of the Chairman of the council was issued. Ministers No. 1532 dated July 31, 1989 amending its name to become the New Borg El Arab city, with a total area of 47,403 acres (191 km^{2}), about 55 km away from Alexandria, about 8 km from the Mediterranean coast and the Alexandria Matrouh coastal road, and about 3 km from Borg El Arab.

New Borg El Arab was established to reduce congestion in Alexandria and to be a natural extension of it. The city is organizationally divided into thirteen residential neighborhoods, comprising many schools, nurseries, buildings for government services, commercial complexes, hospitals, banks, sports clubs, recreational areas, and an area for universities And a technological zone, as well as ten industrial zones that include various industrial activities. The city's location is characterized by being located on a land 28 meters higher than sea level, which makes its climate dry and not humid. The population of the city, according to the statistics of 2022, is about 170,000 people.

== History ==
The history of the establishment of New Borg El Arab city dates back to 1979, when the President of the Arab Republic of Egypt, Anwar Sadat, issued Decree No. 506 on December 5, 1979, which stipulated the allocation of state-owned desert lands in the Matrouh Governorate to establish a new urban complex under the name "New Amiriya City", The area of the new city was determined at 225 km^{2}, and actual planning for the city began in 1981, and the city remained in this name until the decision of the Egyptian Prime Minister Atef Sedky No. 1032 on September 14, 1989 to amend its name to become "New Borg El Arab city", after the visit of the President Egyptian Hosni Mubarak to the city in November 1988.

Since its inception, the city was within the administrative scope of Matrouh Governorate, and remained so until it was annexed to the Alexandria Governorate by decision of the President of the Arab Republic of Egypt Hosni Mubarak No. 101 on March 8, 1990, and the city at that time consisted only of some areas of the first district, where the number of units that It was built into approximately 2,500 housing units divided into low-cost housing, economic housing, medium housing, and above-average housing, in addition to the first and second industrial areas, and in the same year the population of the city reached nearly 4000 people, while the plan included that the city's population would reach about 100,000 people within ten years of its establishment.

In 1992, a plot of 100 acres was allocated for the establishment of The City of Scientific Research and Technological Applications, and in 2009 a plot of 200 acres was allocated for the establishment of the Egypt-Japan University of Science and Technology, and in 2012 the Ministry of Housing, Utilities & Urban Communities began preparing the new general plan for the city. Until the year 2032, which is the second plan of the city since its establishment, where the new plan aims to increase the residential neighborhoods and industrial areas, and the Ministry completed the development of the general plan in January 2014, and was officially approved in 2018, and in May 2019 the general plan was modified by changing the activities of the Green Belt.

== Geography ==
New Borg El Arab is located in Alexandria Governorate, Egypt, at latitude 30° 50' 56" North, longitude 29° 36' 42" East, bounded on the north by Borg El Arab city, on the east Borg El Arab Airport, on the west El Hamam in the Matrouh Governorate and on the south Amreya.

The prevailing climate in New Borg El Arab city is desert climate, characterized by its hot summer and somewhat humid winter, and the average annual temperature is 24.42 degrees Celsius, and January is the coldest month of the year with an average of 11.9 degrees Celsius, and August is the hottest with an average of 25.3 degrees Celsius, and for the level of humidity It is low due to the dry nature of the area and its height above sea level of about 28 meters. The average annual rainfall is about 109 mm.

=== Climate ===
The city is characterized by a relative calm wind, except during the times of "The Khamaseen" winds and during the winter periods, and it blows during the autumn and summer from the north and northwest direction, and from the southeast direction during the spring and winter seasons.

Climate data for New Borg El Arab
Month	Jan	Feb	Mar	Apr	May	Jun	Jul	Aug	Sep	Oct	Nov	Dec	Year
Mean daily maximum °C (°F)	17.0 (62.6)	18.0 (64.4)	19.9 (67.8)	24.0 (75.2)	26.4 (79.5)	29.4 (84.9)	29.5 (85.1)	30.5 (86.9)	28.1 (82.6)	27.4 (81.3)	23.4 (74.1)	19.4 (66.9)	24.42 (75.96)
Daily mean °C (°F)	11.9 (53.4)	13.0 (55.4)	14.7 (58.5)	17.8 (64.0)	21.0 (69.8)	24.1 (75.4)	24.9 (76.8)	25.3 (77.5)	23.9 (75.0)	21.7 (71.1)	18.1 (64.6)	14.2 (57.6)	19.22 (66.60)
Mean daily minimum °C (°F)	6.9 (44.4)	8.1 (46.6)	9.5 (49.1)	11.7 (53.1)	15.6 (60.1)	18.9 (66.0)	20.4 (68.7)	20.2 (68.4)	19.7 (67.5)	16.1 (61.0)	12.8 (55.0)	9.1 (48.4)	14.08 (57.34)
Average rainfall mm (inches)	31 (1.2)	16 (0.6)	10 (0.4)	1 (0.0)	1 (0.0)	0 (0)	0 (0)	0 (0)	0 (0)	3 (0.1)	23 (0.9)	24 (0.9)	109 (4.3)
Average relative humidity (%)	65	61	59	58	61	66	68	70	66	67	66	66	64.4
Mean daily sunshine hours	7.3	8	9.1	10.5	11.3	11.7	11.4	10.3	9.8	8.6	7.9	7.2	9.4
Source: climate-data.org,

== Cityscape and subdivisions ==
Dar Misr

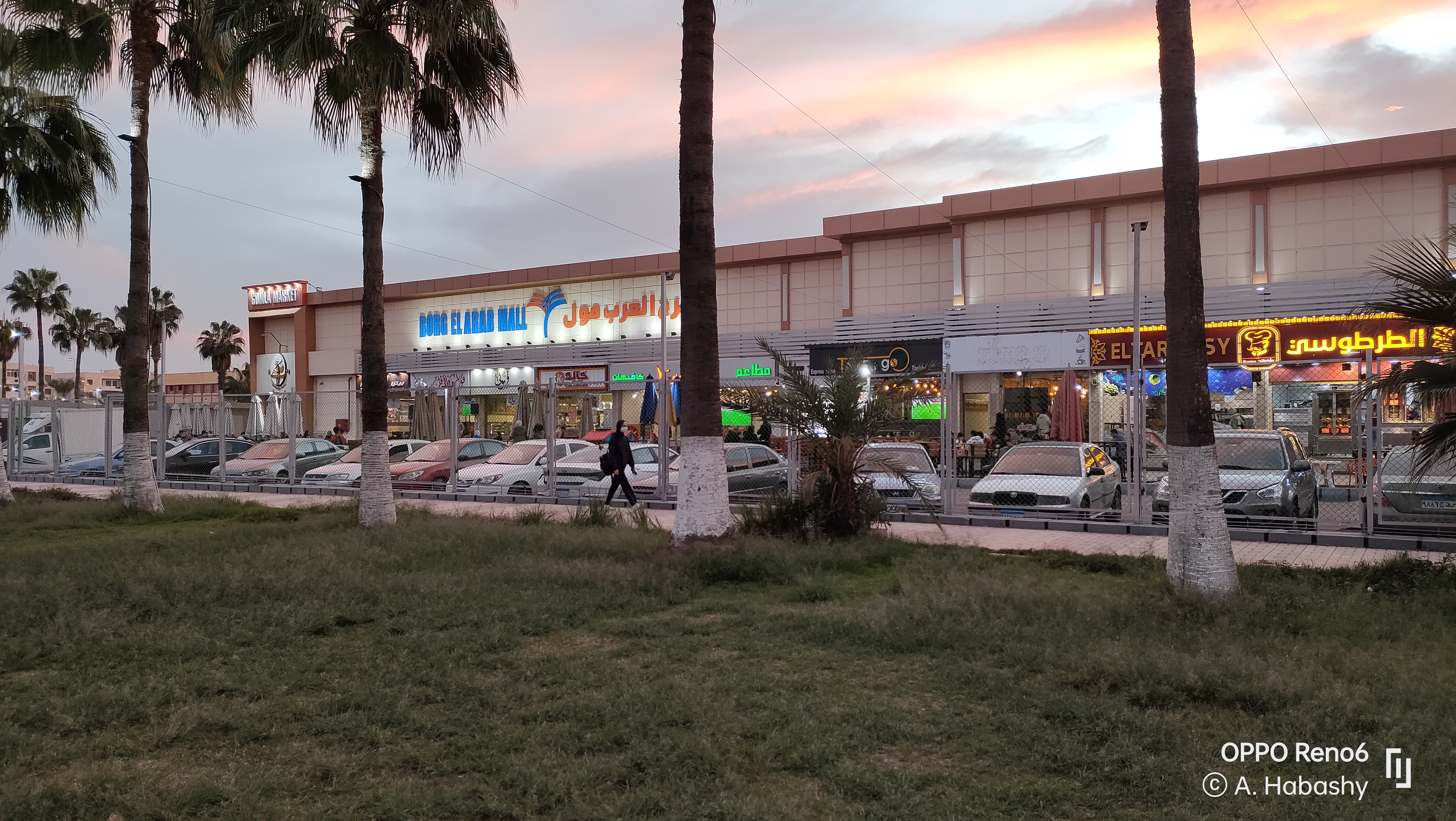
Mall

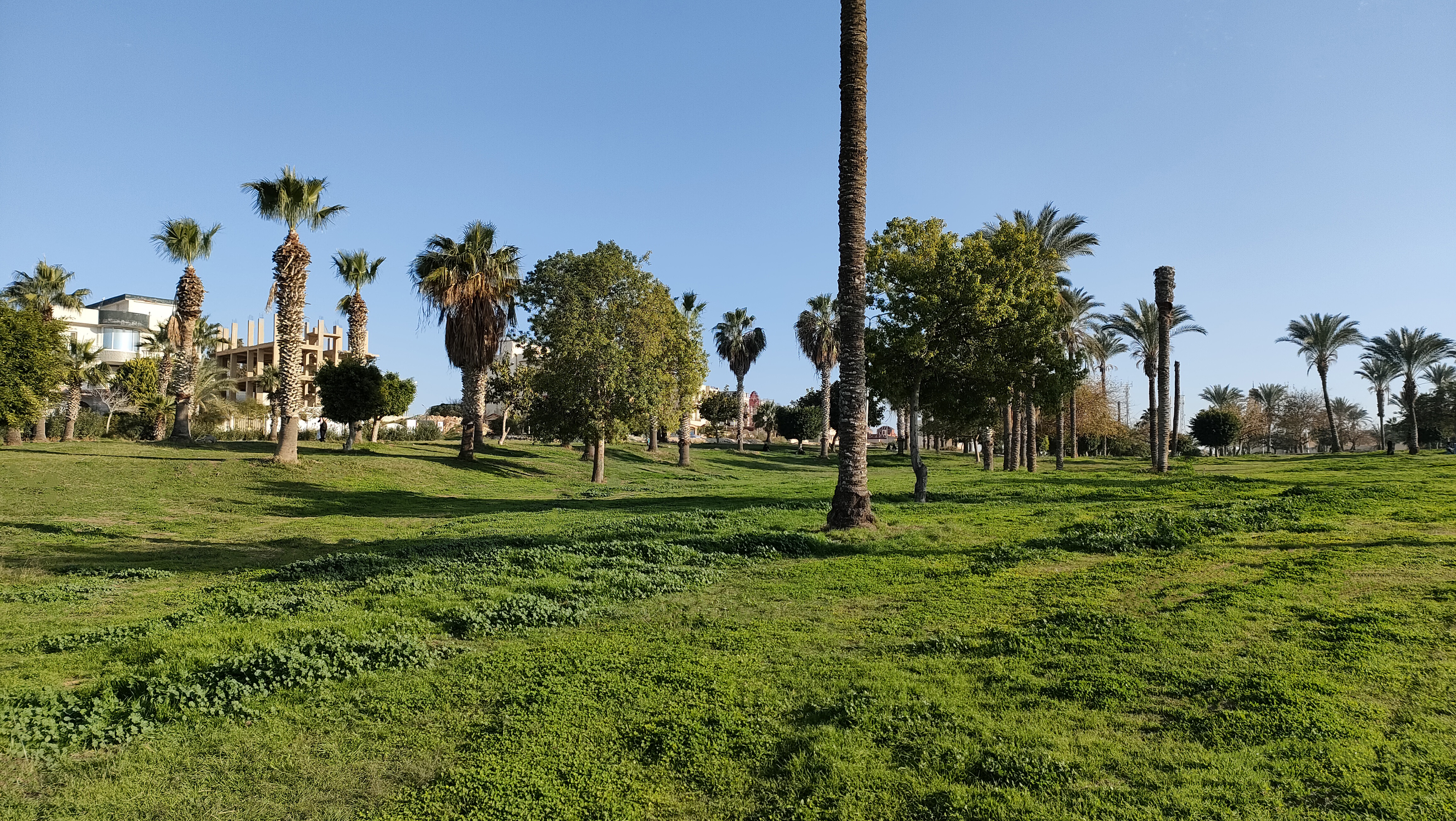
Central Park

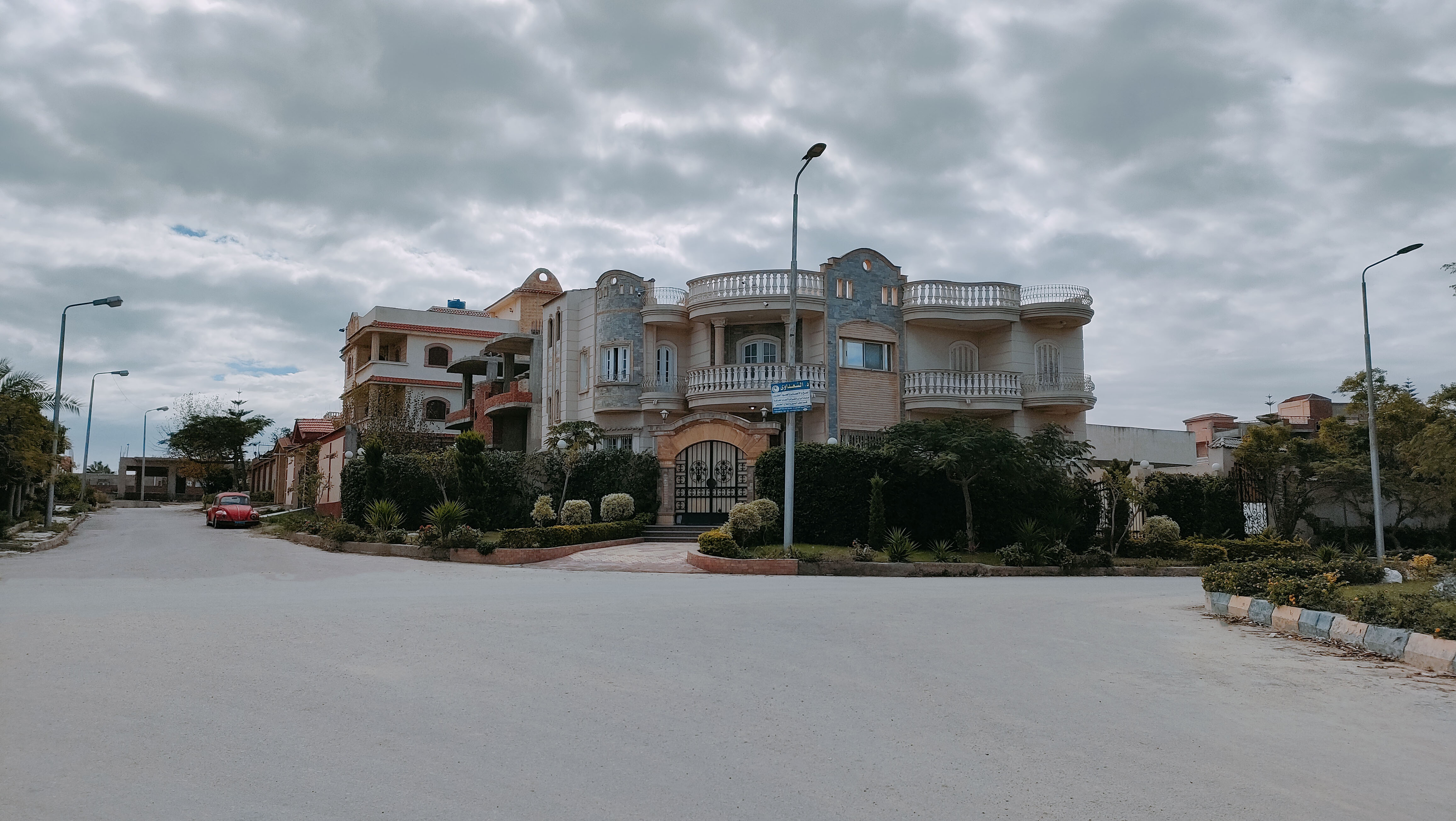
Villa

The total area of New Borg El Arab city is 47,403 acres, divided into residential, service, industrial, and recreational areas. The city is organizationally divided into thirteen residential neighborhoods, other than the industrial areas, as follows:

- The first district which is the city center and includes various categories of housing, economic, average, above average, and distinguished, as well as the city authority, the banks area, the city of engineers, the general hospital, the medical administration, private medical centers, commercial complexes, the police department, a civil defense point, The Civil Registry, the Palace of Culture, the Youth center, the Post Office, public and private schools, and the Central Park.
- The second district includes economic and medium housing categories, a health unit, commercial complexes, public and private schools, and a civil defense point.
- The third district includes the middle and above-average housing categories, Petrosport Club, the Supply Office, the new court, commercial complexes, the National Social Security Authority building, public schools, the temporary building of the Egypt-Japan University of Science and Technology, and the high-end housing project "Dar Misr".
- The fourth district includes distinct housing categories, residential complexes under construction, and sports clubs, which are Smouha SC, Al Ittihad Alexandria Club – under construction – and Egyptian Shooting Club – under construction -.
- The fifth district includes the categories of upper-middle and distinguished housing, housing complexes, and plots of land under construction.
- The sixth district includes economic and medium housing categories, a drinking water lift station, and the Justice City project.
- The seventh district includes the economic and medium housing categories, the "Build Your Home" residential projects and housing for lawyers.
- The eighth district includes the economic and medium housing categories, the social housing project, the Ministry of Awqaf buildings project, government schools, a youth center, a health unit, and commercial centers.
- The ninth district includes economic and medium housing categories, and a housing project for all Egyptians.
- The tenth district includes economic and medium housing categories, and some private residential complexes.
- The districts 11, 12 and 13 are still empty lands that have not been allocated or connected to facilities.
- The Universities district is located between the third district and the sixth district. It includes the City of Scientific Research and Technological Applications, Egypt-Japan University of Science and Technology, Borg El Arab Technological University and The technology zone.
- The central axis which is the main service axis in the city, and extends throughout the city from east to west, and includes Senghor University – under construction -, the city center, mosques, a civil defense point, the Church of the Virgin Mary, Borg El Arab University Hospital, the public parking For passenger transport, commercial complexes, car licensing unit, and the central wholesale market.
- The East of the city area a mixed area east of the city, extends to Alexandria International Airport, which includes cemeteries, Saint Mark's College Club, a central security camp, an armed forces camp, and industrial areas under construction.
- Industrial zones the first, second and sixth industrial zones are located in the east of the city, while the third, fourth and fifth are located in the south of the city

== Demographics ==
=== Population ===
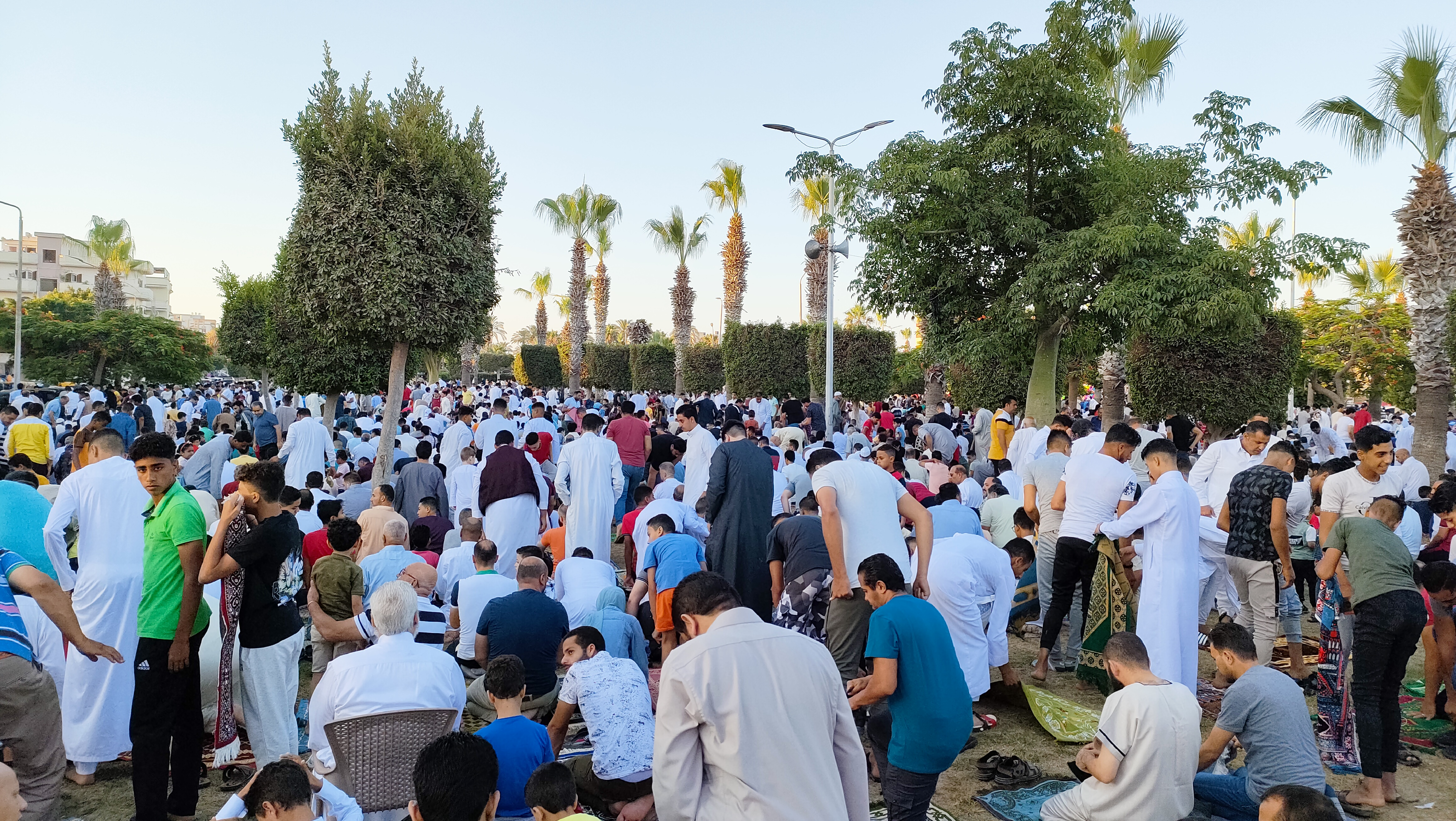
The Population

The population of New Borg El Arab city in 2007 was about 111,391 people, and the population of the city rose in 2011 to about 150 thousand people, and reached about 170 thousand people in 2022, and the population density is about 14.7 people / km^{2}, most of the city's residents are educated people.

The city attracted its residents from the surrounding regions, cities and governorates, especially from Alexandria, Beheira Governorate, Matrouh Governorate, and Kafr El Sheikh Governorate. Therefore, the city's residents belong to different and different social groups, backgrounds and cultures, and the majority of the city's residents work as employees or workers in industrial areas or in other professions, artisanal or commercial.

=== Religion ===
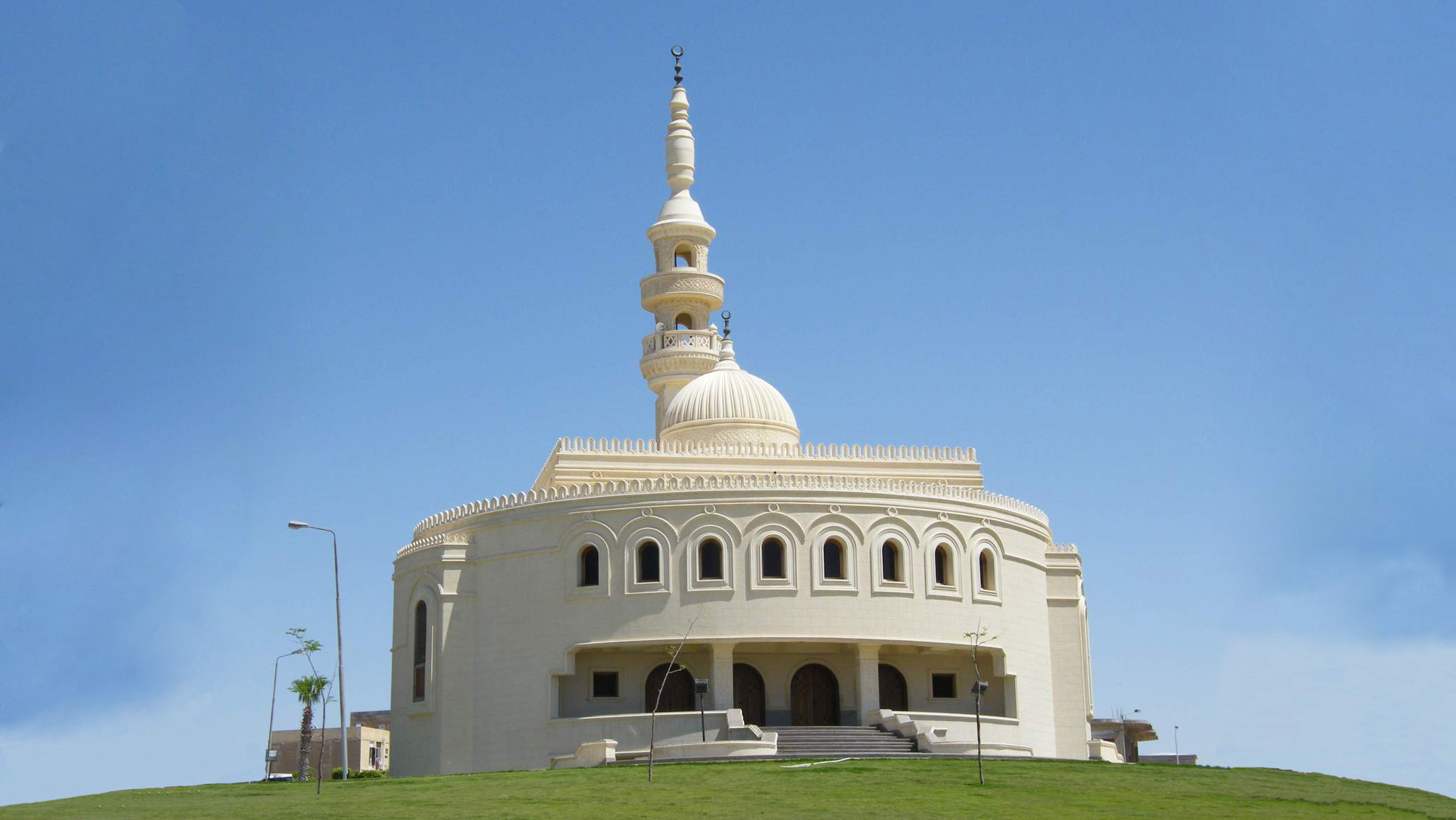
Sattar Latif Mosque

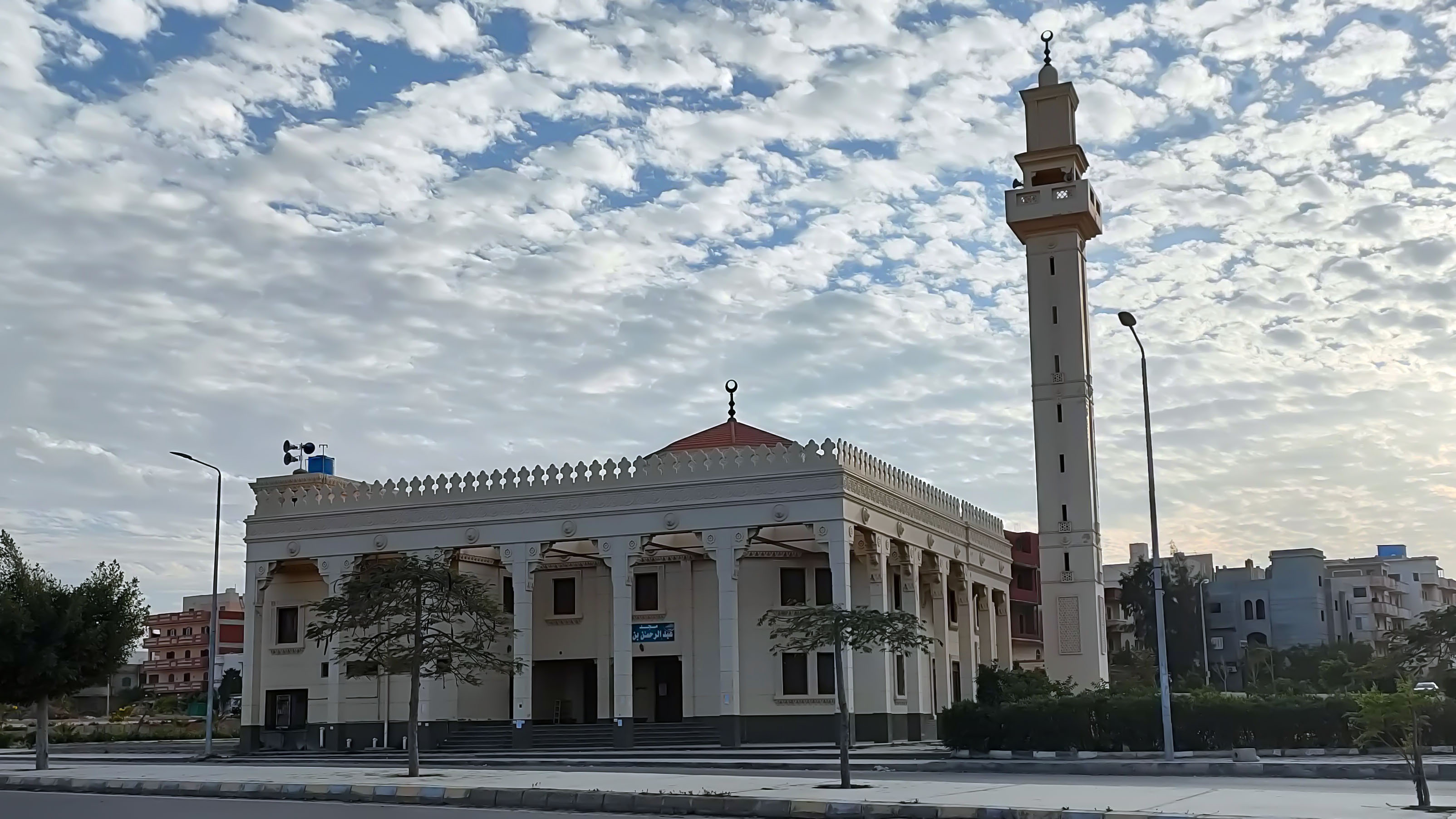
Abdul Rahman bin Auf mosque

New Borg El Arab city includes many of places of worship, such as:

- Ancient mosque
- Sattar Latif Mosque
- Rahman Mosque
- Mosque of conquest
- Abdul Rahman bin Auf mosque
- Nour Al Eman mosque
- Taqwa mosque
- Ahmed Mansy mosque
- Al-Isra Mosque
- Ansar al-Sunna Mosque
- Saint George church
- Saint Virgin Mary church

== Economy ==
=== Banks ===
- New Borg El Arab includes a designated area for banks, housing branches of most major banks operating in Egypt, such as:

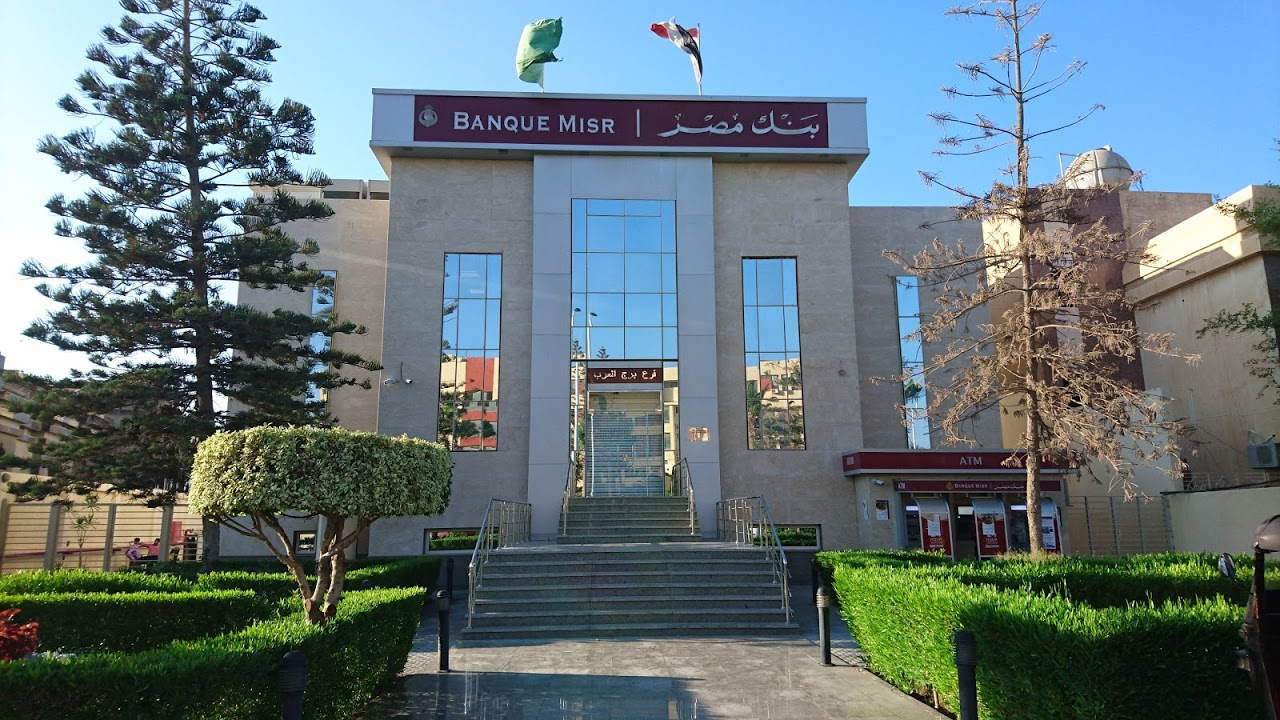
Banque Misr branch

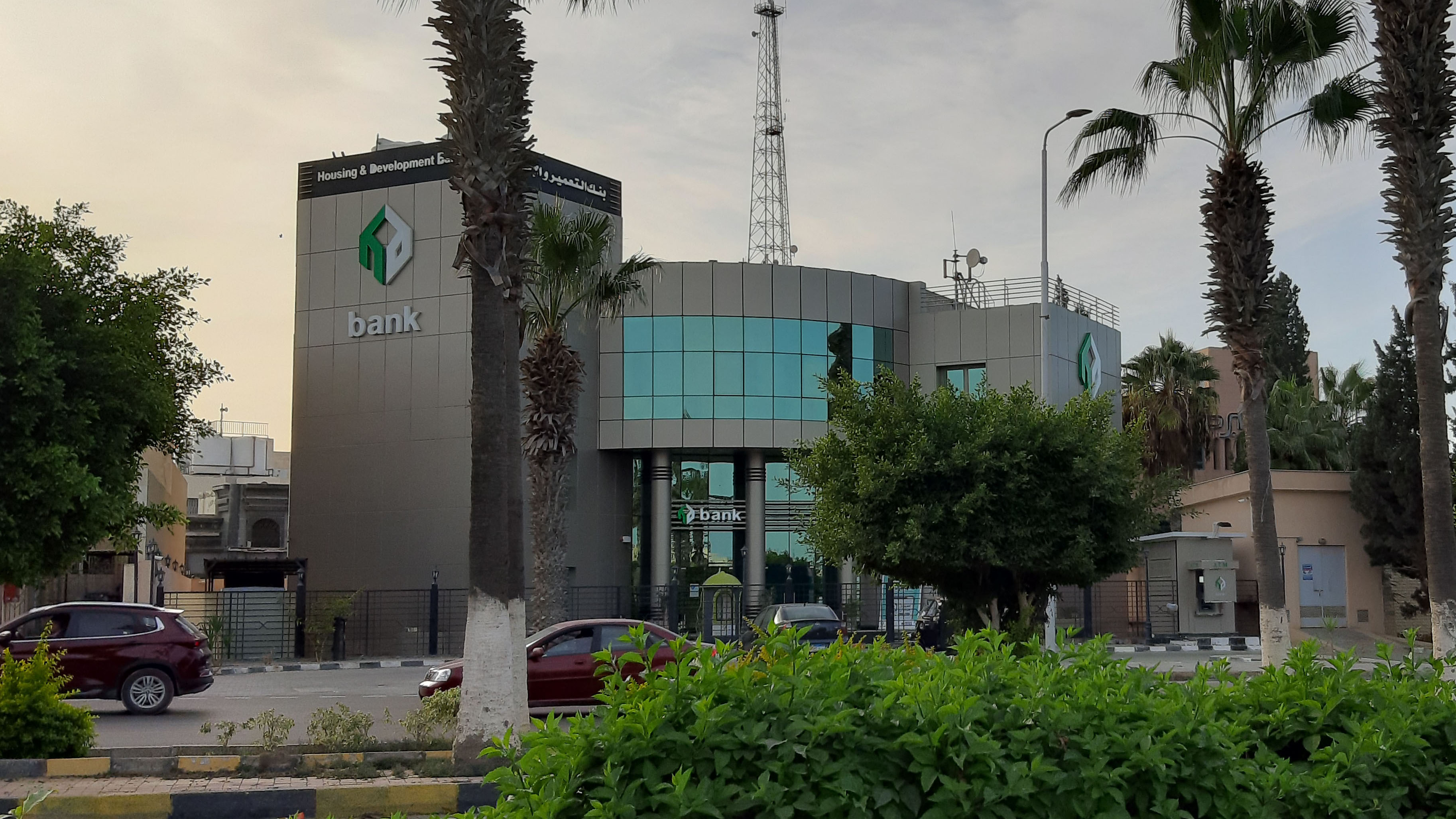
Housing and Development Bank

- Banque Misr
- Commercial International Bank CIB
- Housing and Development Bank
- Export Development Bank
- Industrial Development Bank of Egypt
- Arab African Internatıonal Bank
- Alexbank
- National Bank of Egypt
- Al Baraka Group
- QNB Egypt
- Banque du Caire
- Crédit Agricole Egypt
- The united bank
- Suez Canal Bank

=== Industrial areas ===
- The total area allocated for industrial activity in the city is currently about 4453 acres, divided into five existing industrial zones, other than five areas to be established, comprising more than 1,300 factories with a capital of about £E17.7 billion, with an annual production of about £E21.7 billion. These factories allowed nearly 103 thousand job opportunities with annual wages amounting to £E411 million.

== Infrastructure ==
=== Health ===
New Borg El Arab city includes many of hospitals and medical centers such as:

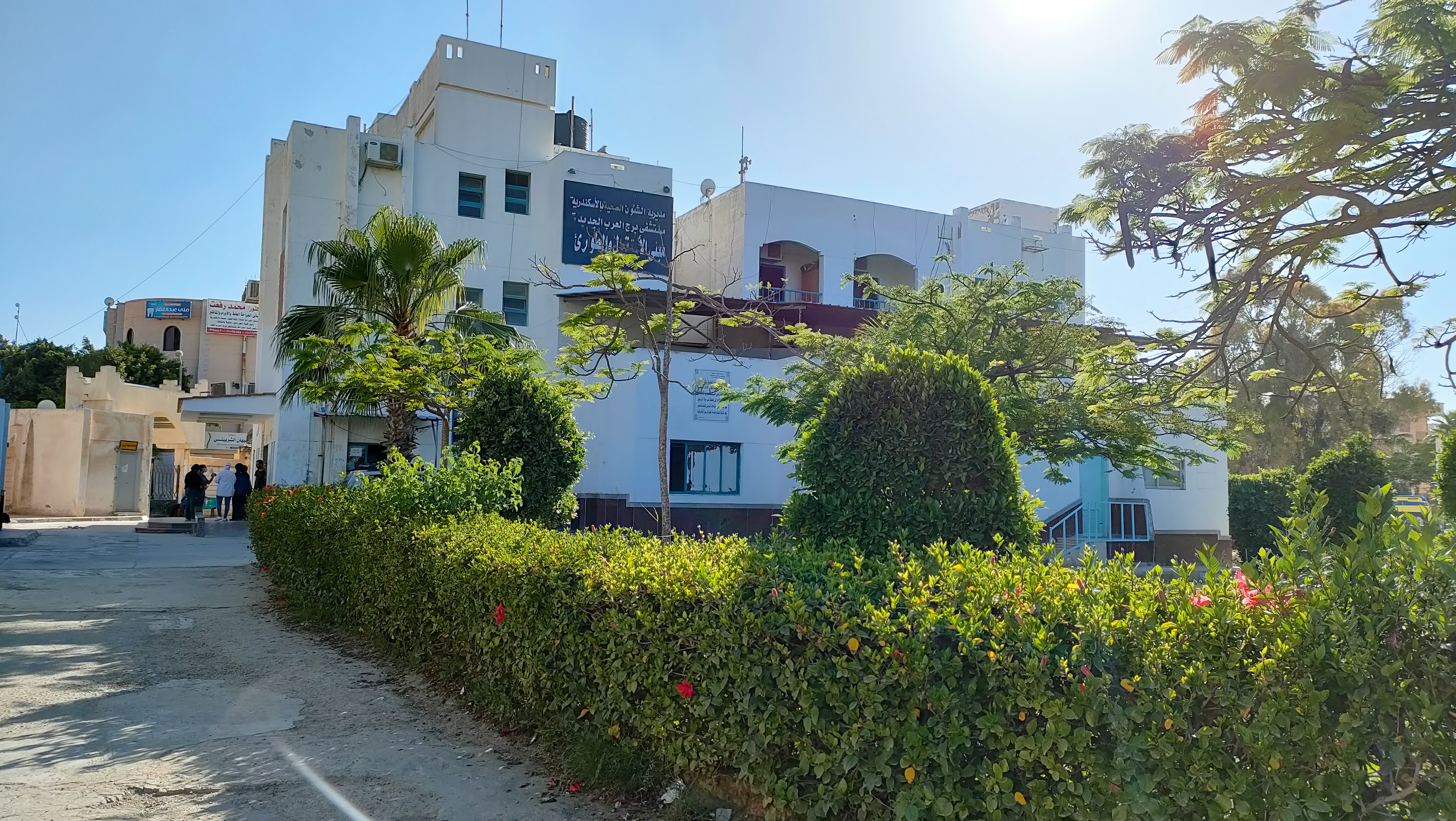
New Borg El Arab Hospital

- Al Salam Royal Hospital.
- New Borg El Arab Hospital.
- Borg El Arab University Hospital.
- Juweili Medical Center.
- Mabaret Al Borg Medical Center.
- Abdul Fadil Medical Center.

=== Education ===
New Borg El Arab city includes many of the nurseries, schools and universities such as:

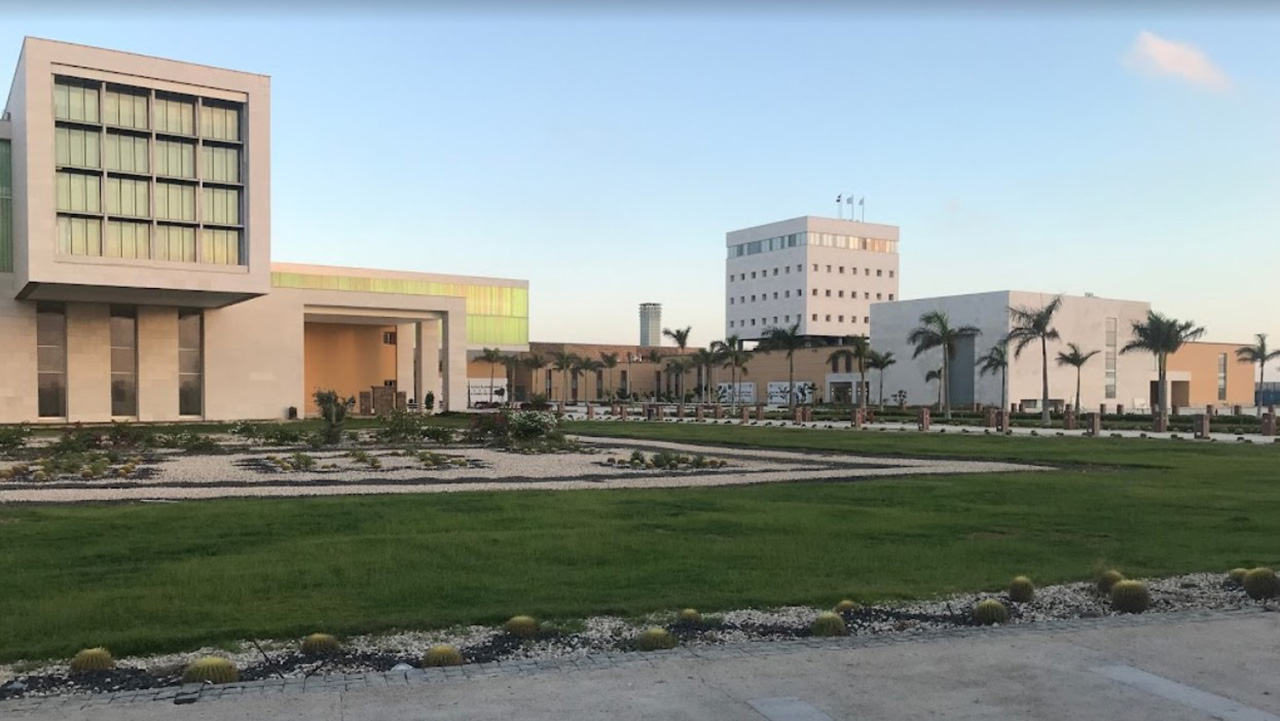
Egypt-Japan University

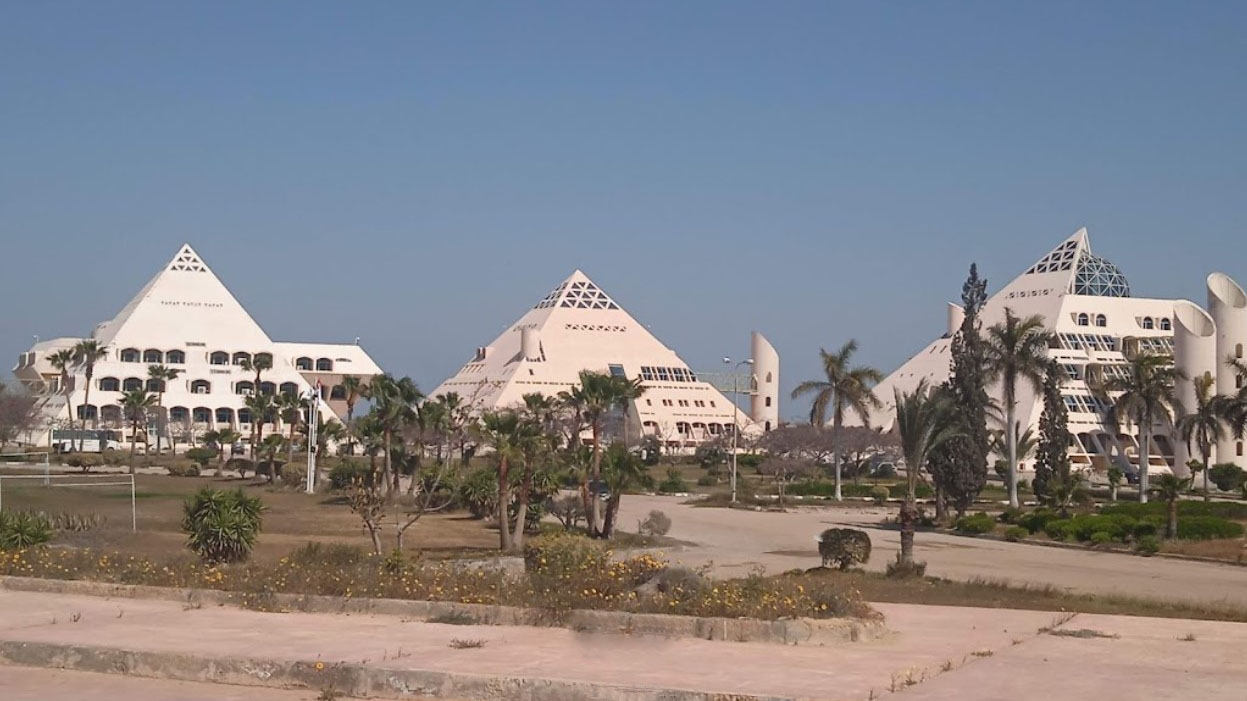
City of Scientific Research

- Egypt-Japan University of Science and Technology.
- City of Scientific Research and Technological Applications.
- Senghor University.
- Borg El Arab Technological University.
- Higher Institute of Engineering and Technology.
- Borg El Arab Industrial Secondary School.
- GIT School of Applied Technology.
- Egyptian Japanese Schools.
- Harvest International School.
- Alexandria STEM School.

=== Sports and Entertainment ===
New Borg El Arab city includes many facilities, sports clubs and recreational areas, such as:

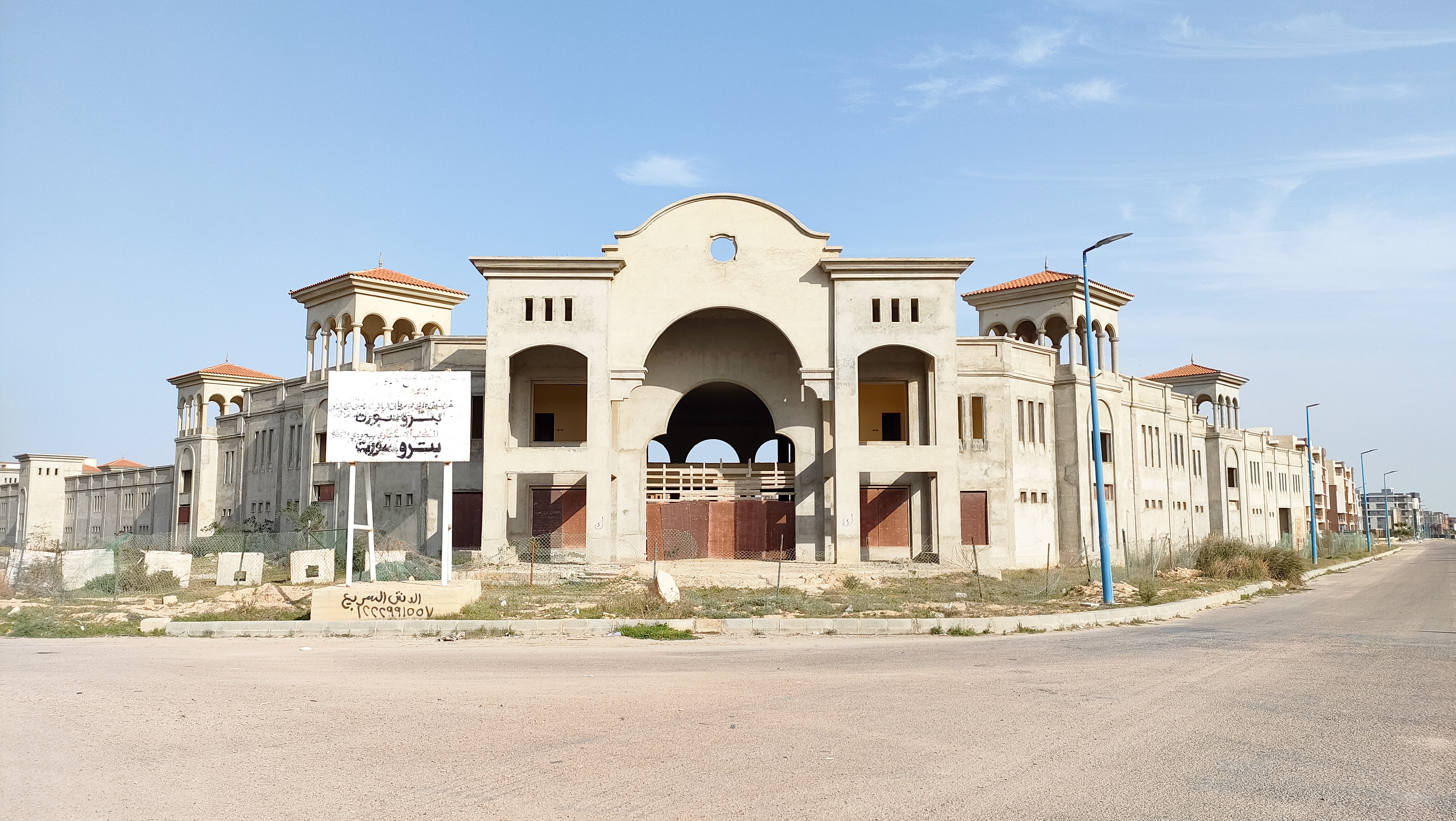
Petrosport club

- Smouha SC.
- Al Ittihad Alexandria Club.
- Egyptian Shooting Club.
- Petrosport club.
- Candela Recreational Area.
- Central park.
- The Children's park.

=== Transportation ===
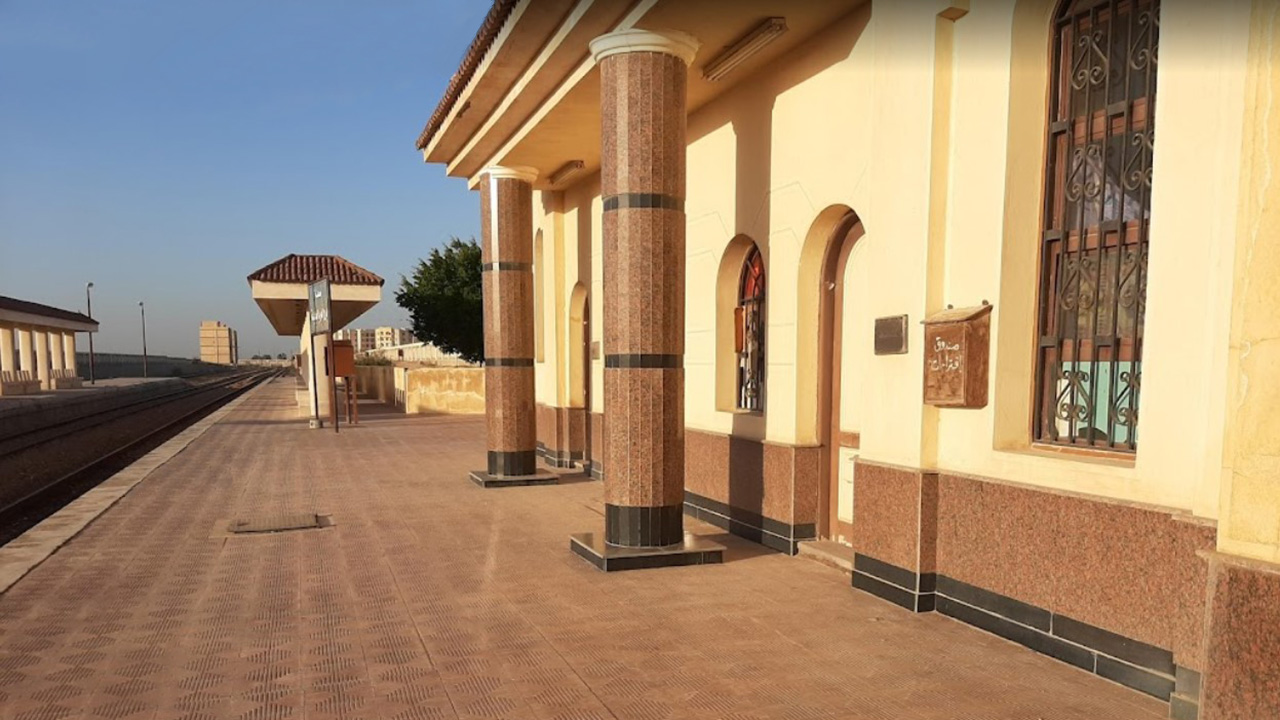
New Borg El Arab Train Station

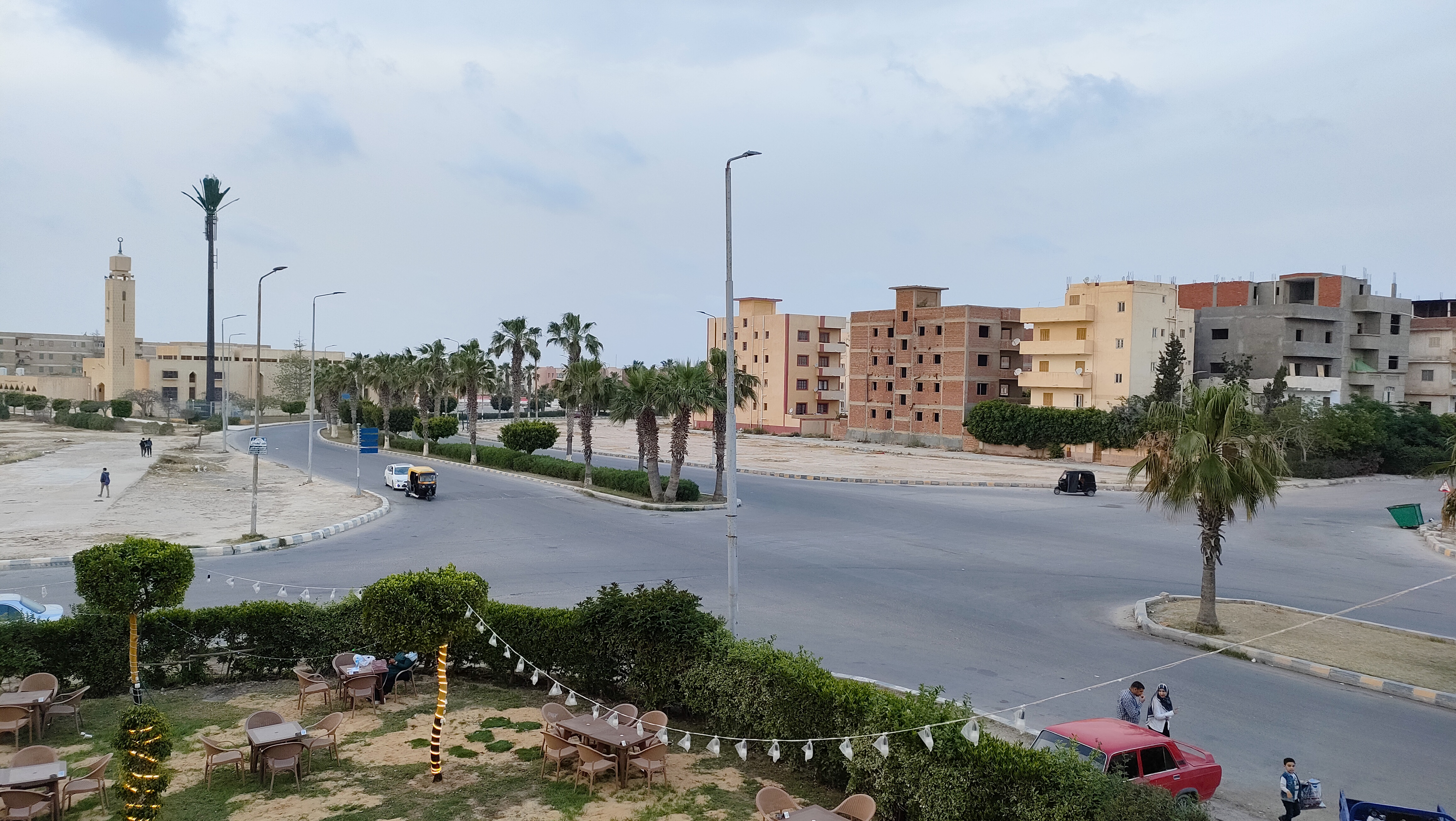
Intersection road

The total road networks in New Borg El Arab city are approximately 630 km, and they are linked to the Cairo–Alexandria desert road through the 27 km long Kafoury-New Borg El Arab road, and to the international coastal road through an 8 km long road, and to Borg El Arab International Airport through a road with a length of 13 km, and there is an internal transport system consisting of buses that follow the city's authority and others that follow the General Authority for Passenger Transport in Alexandria, service lines, and taxis. The city is also connected to Alexandria through a train that runs from Sidi Gaber railway station to the city.

A main station is currently being constructed within the first line of High-speed rail in Egypt project next to the northern entrance to the city, and it is also planned that the Alexandria metro project, in its third phase, will reach the city. It has minibus taxis and bus lines that connect the city with the areas of Misr Station, Mahatet El Raml, El Manshiyya, Azarita, Moharam Bek, Amreya, Borg El Arab, KM 21 and the capital Cairo.

=== Drinking water and sewage ===
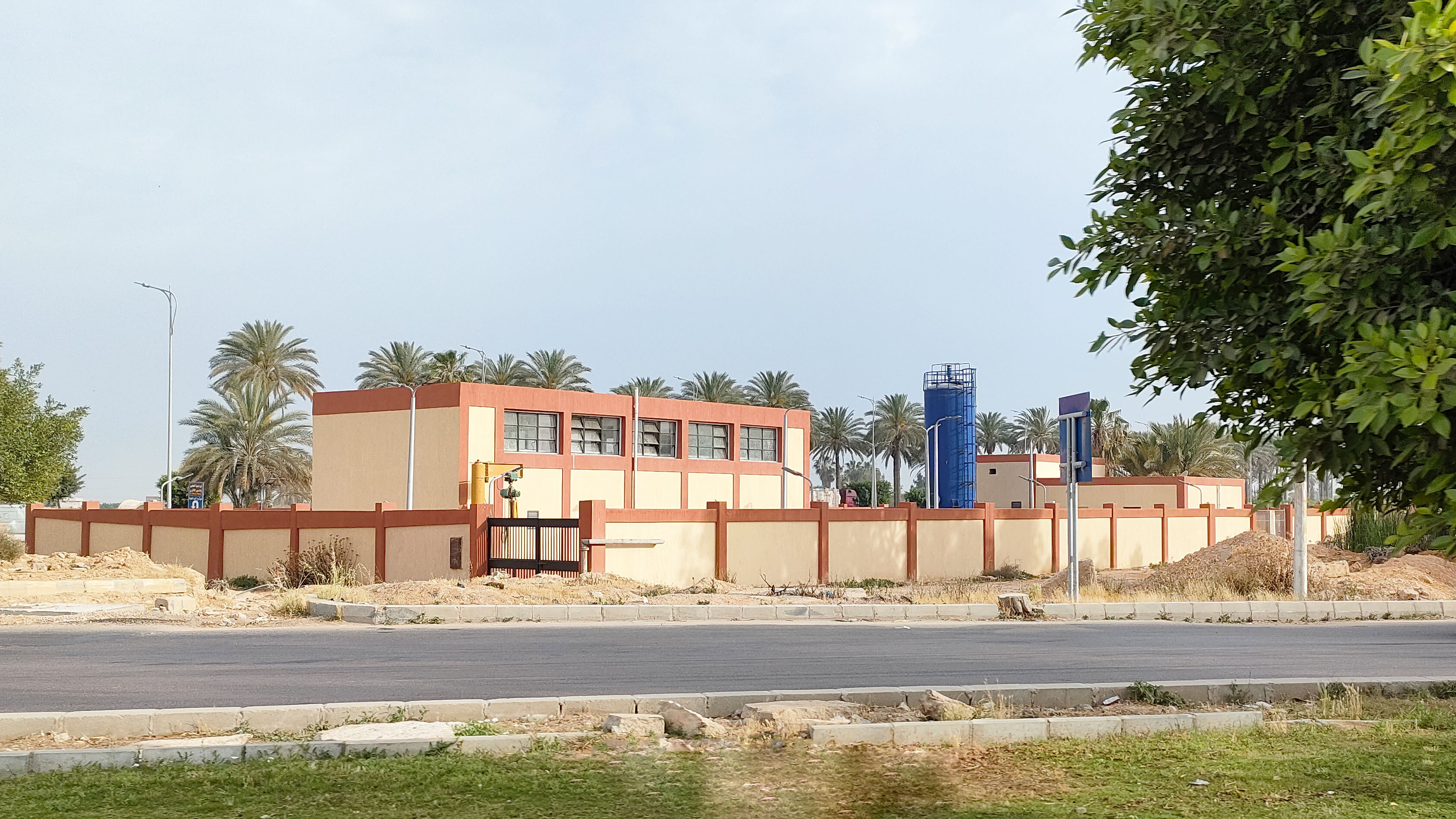
Pumping station

New Borg El Arab city is fed with drinking water through the 40 kilometer water treatment plant "Mariot 2" located on the Cairo–Alexandria desert road, affiliated to the Alexandria Water Company, through three lines with diameters of 1000, 1500 and 1500mm, with a capacity of about 166 thousand m3 Daily, to three water pumping stations in the city with a lifting capacity of about 92,880 m3/day, in addition to the number of two Water towers in the second industrial zone and the sixth district for use in times of emergency. The length of the city's water distribution networks is about 655 km.

The city includes two sewage treatment plants belonging to the Alexandria Sewage Company. The first operates with an oxidation pond system with a capacity of 100,000 m3/day and is located east of the city, while the second operates with a triple treatment system with a capacity of 115 thousand m3/day with a total energy of 345 thousand m3/day. It will be implemented in three phases and is located to the west of the city. The length of the city's Sewerage is about 446 km.

=== Electricity and Natural gas ===
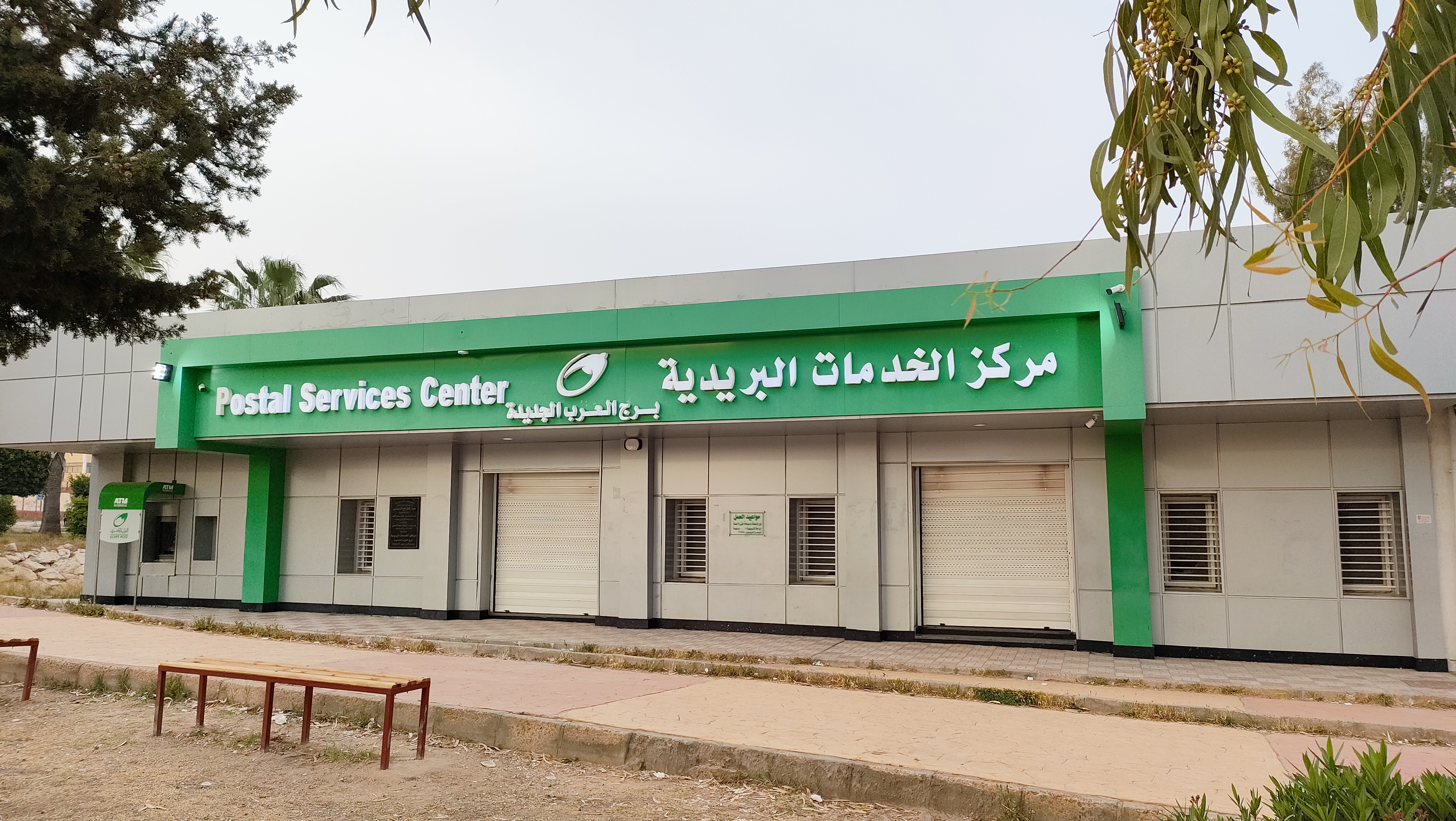
Postal service center

The length of electrical wires network in the city is approximately 2100 km, the capacity of electrical stations is 325 MV, the number of transformers in the city is 87 transformers, and a number of 19 distributors in various residential neighborhoods and industrial areas.

As for natural gas networks, the length of the city's gas lines reaches more than 100 km, the capacity of gas stations is 100 thousand m 3 / hour, and the number of network organizers is 12 on all lines.

=== Telecommunications ===
The length of the city's terrestrial communications network is approximately 410 km distributed across all residential neighborhoods and industrial areas, through the City Central Building of Telecom Egypt with a capacity of 30,000 land lines that can be increased, in addition to the presence of relay towers for mobile phone networks throughout the city. The city also includes a postal services center affiliated to the Egypt Post and is located in the first district.

== See also ==
- 6th of October City
- New Cairo
