= Borg El Arab Technological University =

University in Egypt

Coordinates: 30.8577°N 29.5717°E

- جامعة برج العرب التكنولوجية
- The main university building
- Type: National university
- Established: 2022; 4 years ago
- Founder: Ministry of Higher Education
- President: Mohamed Morsi El Gohary
- Location: New Borg El Arab, Alexandria Governorate, Egypt
- Language: Arabic, English
- Website: batechu.com

- Location within Nile Delta Location within Egypt

Borg El Arab Technological University is a national, non-profit Egyptian university, one of the technological universities that are established in accordance with Law No. 72 of 2019 which organize the establishment of technological universities in Egypt, which are educational institutions that follow the method of education and training for students in various specialties needed by the labor market while developing and building the skills necessary to enroll graduates in the labor market directly. The university is located in the universities district in New Borg El Arab city in Alexandria Governorate, on an area of 42 thousand square meters.

The university campus includes the educational building and has classrooms of different sizes, a cafeteria, workshops and laboratories building, an administrative building, a library, playgrounds, and a parking lot. The duration of study at the university is four years, and the university, like other technological universities, grants degrees according to specialization, which are the above-average professional diploma in technology, the professional bachelor's in technology, the professional master's in technology, and the professional doctorate in technology. The study at the university was started in September 2022.

== Academic programs ==
The university includes many academic programs, including:

- Information Technology (IT)
- HealthTech
- Technology of operation and maintenance of textile manufacturing
- Technology of tractors and agricultural machinery
- Technology of the food industry
- Rail transport technology
- Health Specialties

== Photo gallery ==
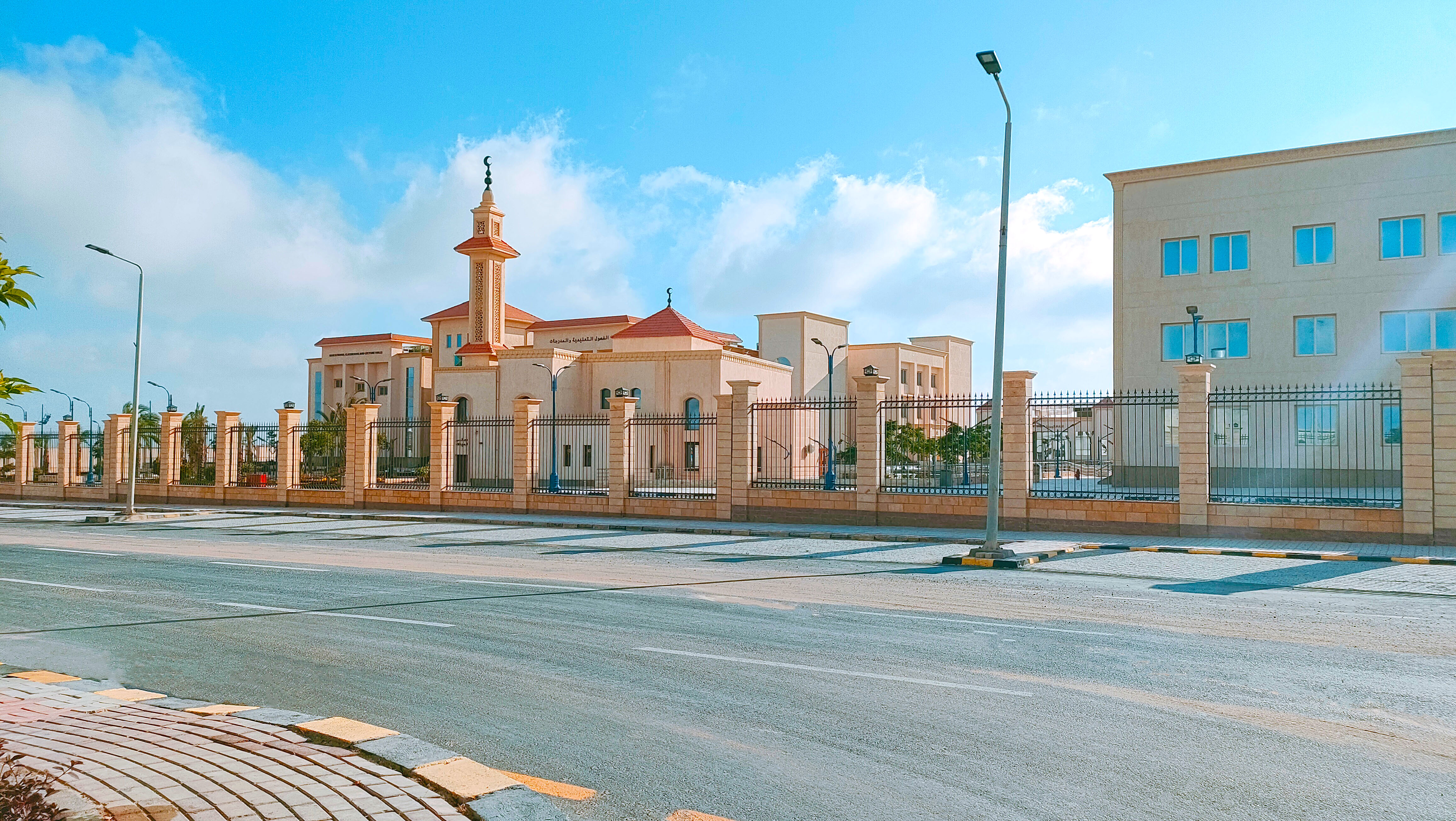
The Mosque and educational classes

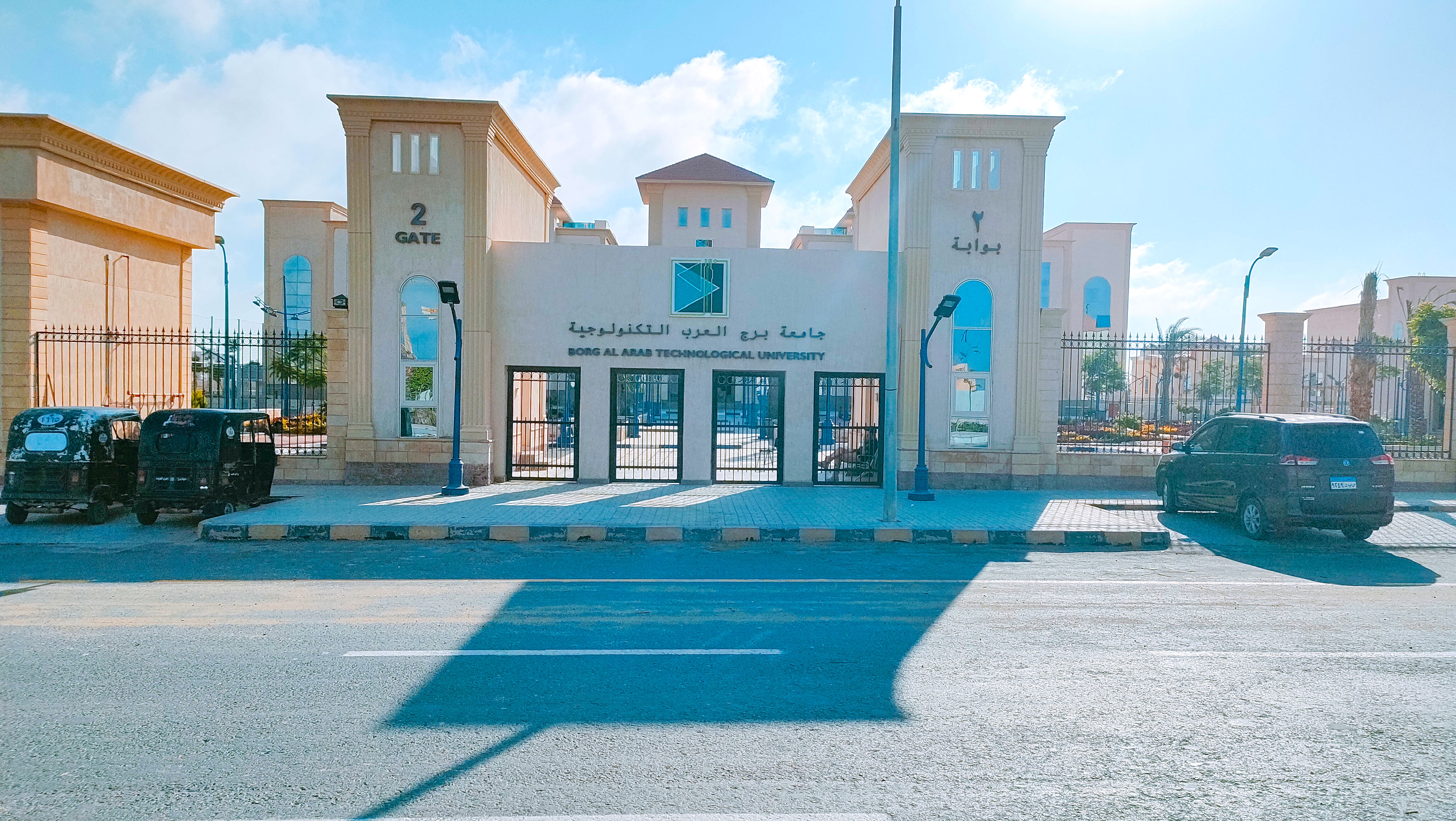
one of the gates of university

== See also ==
- Egypt-Japan University of Science and Technology.
- Alexandria International University.
- City of Scientific Research and Technological Applications.
