= Children's Cancer Hospital Egypt =

Children Cancer Hospital Egypt
- AFNCI
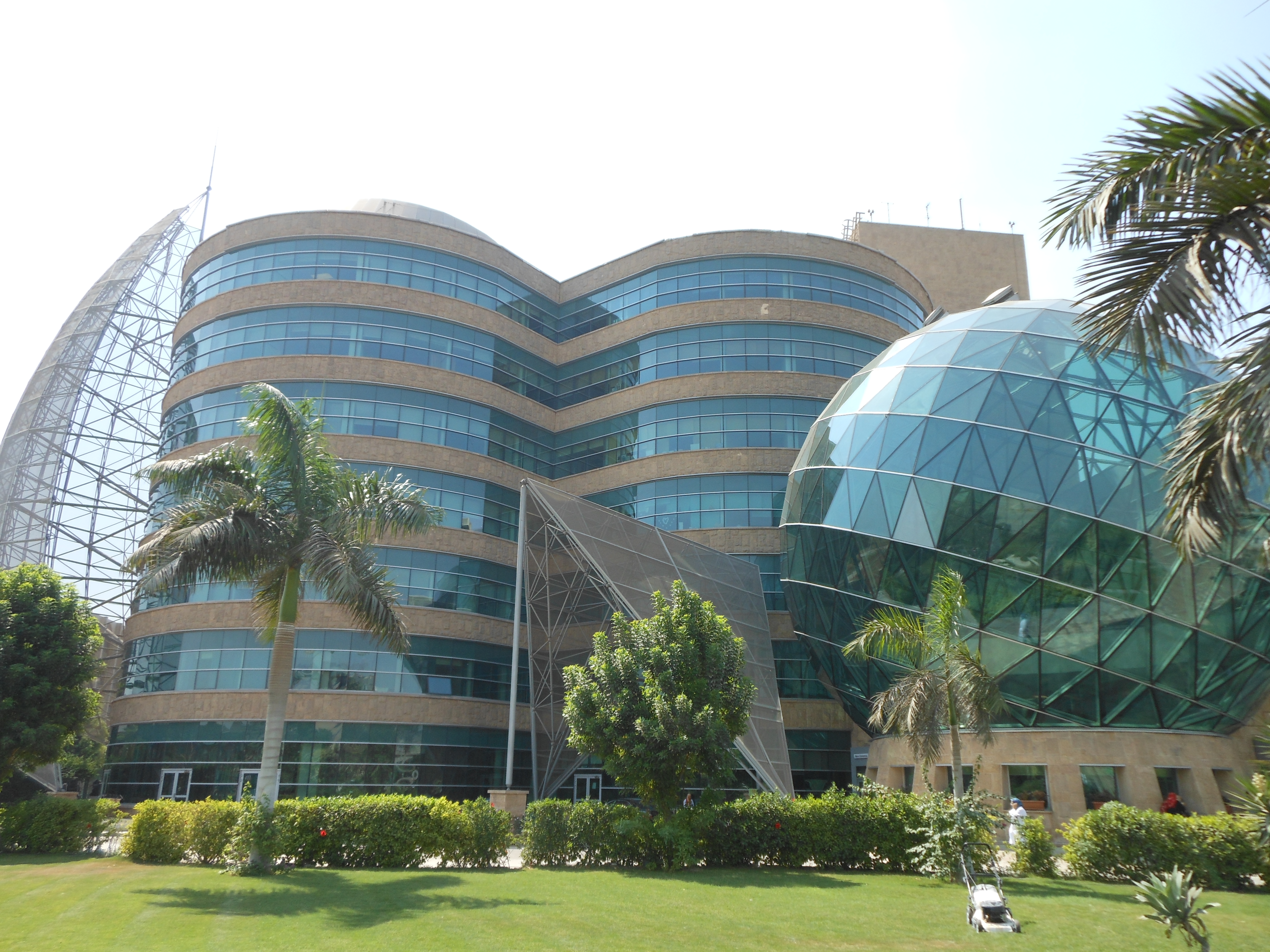

Geography
- Location: Zeinhom, El-Sayeda Zainab, Cairo Governorate, Egypt
- Coordinates: 30.022715°N 31.237870°E

Organisation
- Type: Specialist

Services
- Beds: 320
- Speciality: Children's cancer

History
- Founded: 2007

Links
- Website: www.57357.org
- Lists: Hospitals in Egypt

Children's Cancer Hospital Egypt, also known as 57357 hospital after the hospital's widely published bank account number for donations, is a hospital in Cairo is a hospital specialising in children's cancer. With 320 beds, the building is the largest pediatric oncology hospital in the world.

== Creation ==
Fundraising for the hospital, including well-attended benefit festivals, started in 1998, with a target date for opening of December 2003. It renamed itself to 57357 for a period after the bank account for donations and carried the name across the many festivals to remind people of how to donate.

The hospital eventually opened in 2007, The building only took up half the allocated plot of land, with the intention of future expansion. Each floor was themed with a different colour, for example, the basement floor was coloured aquamarine and themed with underwater discovery.

The project was funded entirely by donations, including through many small donations and with 90% of the total coming from within Egypt. It works on an "ability-to-pay" basis. One reason that the project was successful is that the Grand Mufti in Egypt had declared that the fundraising campaign would constitute a legitimate zakat.

== Facilities ==
With 320 beds, the Children's Cancer Hospital Egypt is the largest hospital in the world specialising in pediatric oncology. The hospital treats nearly half of all pediatric cancer cases in Egypt. Within the grounds there are playrooms, a library and a 90,000 square feet (8,400 m^{2}) park.

== See also ==
- Borg El Arab University Hospital
