= Banking in Egypt =

Financial system of Egypt

Banking in Egypt is regulated by the Central Bank of Egypt. Egypt’s banking sector has undergone major reforms since the 1990s, resulting in a liberalized and modernized system aligned with international standards. Financial inclusion has expanded, with 74.8% of Egyptians aged 15 and above using financial accounts, reaching 52 million users by 2024. Usage spans banks, Egypt Post, mobile wallets like Vodafone Cash and MobiCash, and prepaid cards like Meeza. Women’s financial inclusion grew 295% since 2016 thanks to policies and initiatives aimed at empowering women financially, reaching 68.8%, while youth participation rose 65% from 2020 to 2024, hitting 53.1%.

== History ==
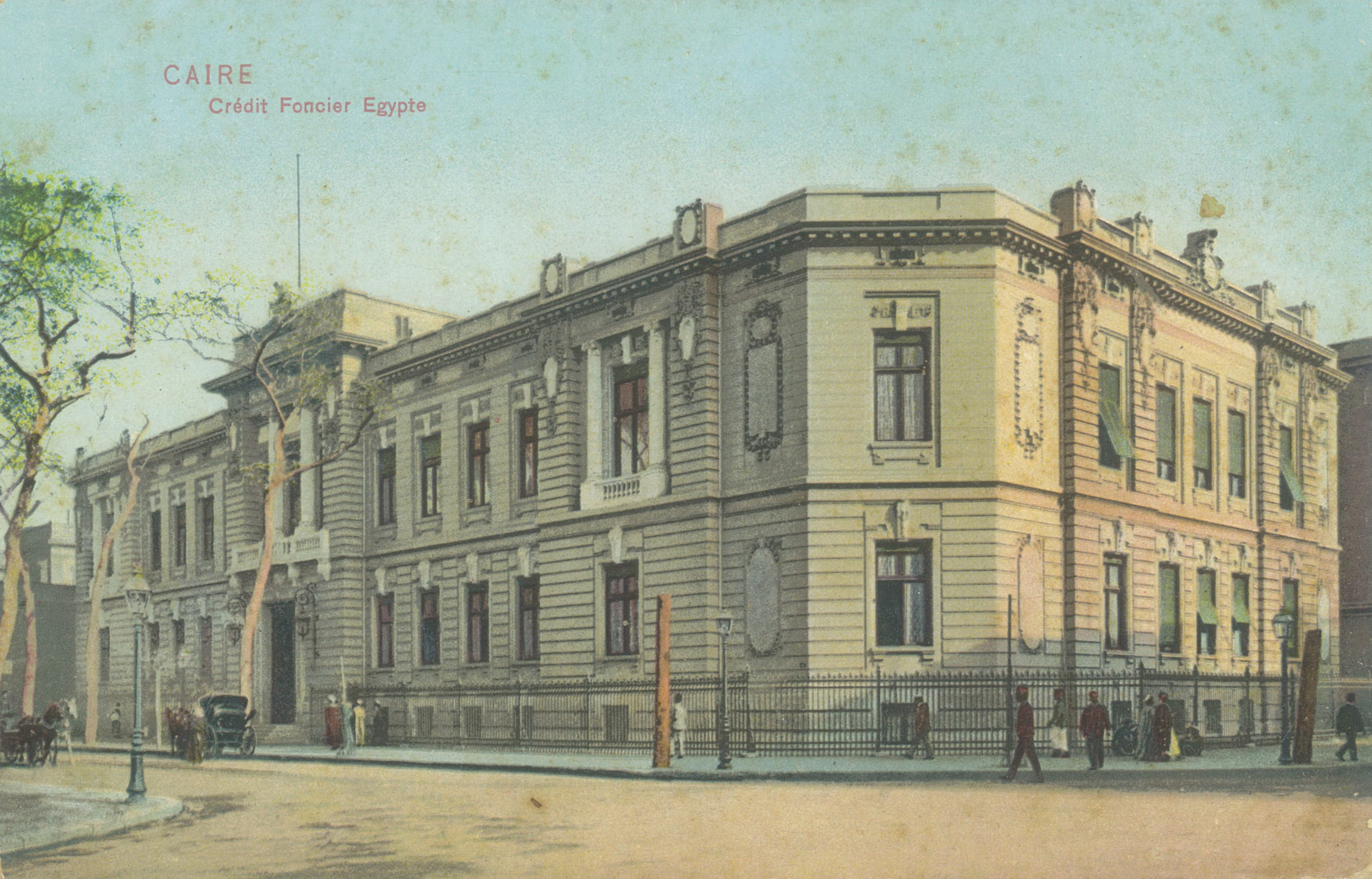
A postcard depicting the building of the Crédit Foncier Égyptien, the oldest bank in Cairo, founded in 1880.

Following the 1952 Revolution, Egypt nationalized its banking sector. Large foreign and private banks were merged into the "Big Four" state-owned banks: National Bank of Egypt (NBE), Banque Misr, Banque du Caire, and Bank of Alexandria. For decades, these entities held a near-monopoly on the financial system.

In 2003, the first measures to begin floating the price of the Egyptian pound were implemented.

The most critical period for Merging and Acquisitions in Egypt began in 2004 under a Central Bank of Egypt reform plan. The goal was to reduce the number of banks (from about 57 down to 39) by raising the minimum capital requirement from EGP 100 million to EGP 500 million. Smaller banks that couldn't meet this were forced to merge or be acquired.

In 2006, a major cleanup operation, the CBE merged three struggling banks—The Nile Bank, Egyptian United Bank, and the Islamic International Bank for Investment & Development; into a single entity, The United Bank, owned 99.9% by the CBE.

In 2006, Italy’s Sanpaolo IMI (now Intesa Sanpaolo) bought 80% of the state-owned Bank of Alexandria, marking a major milestone in privatization.

=== 2011 Egyptian Revolution ===
During the 2011 Revolution, the country’s financial system had to abruptly pivot from a period of robust post-reform growth to emergency crisis management. Despite severe macroeconomic shocks, the banking sector demonstrated remarkable resilience, banks across Egypt closed their doors for roughly a week (and faced intermittent closures throughout February) as street protests paralyzed the economy. When banks finally reopened on February 6, 2011, the CBE imposed strict daily withdrawal limits to prevent a run on banks. Individuals were capped at pulling out EGP 50,000 and $10,000 in foreign currency per day. Despite closures, an estimated $1.5 billion of foreign investment left Egyptian Treasury bills in the earliest wave of the crisis, as international investors and local wealthy individuals sought to de-risk. Following the Egyptian Revolution, HSBC was accused of helping to enrich high-ranking Egyptian political and economic officials, who are now at the center of corruption investigations.

=== Recent History ===
In October 2023, Commercial International Bank and Arab International Bank have suspended foreign currency purchases and withdrawals using debit cards from abroad; Arab African Internatıonal Bank, start setting new limits on cash withdrawals abroad ranging from EGP 11,000 (USD 355) to EGP 33,000 (USD 1,067) per month. Banque Misr, National Bank of Egypt and HSBC set withdrawal and purchase limits abroad, ranging from EGP 3,092 (USD 100) to EGP 30,944 (USD 1000).

In January 2024, Standard Chartered launched operation in Egypt.

On March 6, 2024, the Central Bank of Egypt decided to reduce the exchange rate of the Egyptian pound against the US dollar for the first time in more than 14 months, following an exceptional meeting that raised interest rates by about 600 basis points. The Central Bank confirmed in a statement that, within the framework of targeting inflation rates, it would work to allow the exchange rate to be determined according to market mechanisms.

In September 2024, the government announced its intention to sell its stakes in 32 companies, including the Banque du Caire, the Arab African Internatıonal Bank, and Alexbank, through the Egyptian Exchange.

== List of operational banks ==
Rank	Bank name	Country	Total assets (US$ Millions)	Branches
1	National Bank of Egypt	Egypt	156 891	679
2	Banque Misr	Egypt	78 000	820
3	Commercial International Bank	Egypt	23 406	214
4	Arab African Internatıonal Bank	Egypt	18 200	99
5	QNB Egypt	Qatar	17 913	239
6	Banque du Caire	Egypt	10 272	245
7	Fabmisr	United Arab Emirates	9 180	74
8	Abu Dhabi Islamic Bank	United Arab Emirates	7 300	72
9	Suez Canal Bank	Egypt	5 700	55
10	HSBC Bank Egypt	United Kingdom	5 463	53
11	Faisal Islamic Bank of Egypt	Egypt	5 400	43
12	Housing and Development Bank	Egypt	5 100	100
13	Emirates NBD	United Arab Emirates	4 978	69
14	Arab Bank Egypt	Jordan	4 900	44
15	Arab International Bank	Egypt	4 626	23
16	Alexbank	Egypt	4 512	210
17	Export Development Bank	Egypt	4 400	45
18	Agricultural Bank of Egypt	Egypt	4 360	1210
19	National Bank of Kuwait (Egypt)	Kuwait	4 260	53
20	ADCB Egypt	United Arab Emirates	3 338	46
21	Saib Bank	Egypt	3 250	46
22	Crédit Agricole Egypt	France	3 100	87
23	Kuwait Finance House	Kuwait	3 044	44
24	Attijariwafa Bank Egypt	Morocco	2 972	64
25	Al Baraka Group	Bahrain	2 768	43
26	Al Ahli Bank of Kuwait Egypt	Kuwait	2 732	45
27	Egyptian Arab Land Bank	Egypt	2 600	43
28	Egyptian Gulf Bank	Egypt	2 529	60
29	Bank ABC	Bahrain	2 200	52
30	The United Bank	Egypt	2 100	68
31	Bank NXT	Egypt	1 880	33
32	Mashreq Bank	United Arab Emirates	1 258	13
33	Industrial Development Bank of Egypt	Egypt	1 137	26
34	Citibank Egypt	United States	1 092	3
35	MIDBank	Egypt	551	17

== Ceased operation in Egypt ==
Bank name	Start	End	Fate
(United States) Egyptian American Bank	1976	2006	Merged to Crédit Agricole start operation
(France) Calyon Bank	2004	2006	Merged to Crédit Agricole start operation
(Egypt) Alexandria Commercial Bank	1981	2006	Acquired by Union National Bank.
(Egypt) Al Watany Bank	1980	2007	Acquired by National Bank of Kuwait.
(Egypt) National Development Bank		2007	Acquired by Abu Dhabi Islamic Bank.
(France) National Société Générale Bank	1978	2013	Acquired by QNB Group.
(France) BNP Paribas	1977	2013	Acquired by Emirates NBD.
(United States) Citibank (Retail banking only)	1955	2015	Acquired by Commercial International Bank.
(Canada) Scotiabank	1976	2015	Acquired by Arab African Internatıonal Bank.
(Greece) Piraeus Bank	2005	2015	Acquired by Al Ahli Bank Of Kuwait.
(United Kingdom) Barclays	1864	2016	Acquired by Attijariwafa Bank.
National Bank of Oman		2019	Liquidated.
(United Arab Emirates) Union National Bank	2006	2020	Acquired by ADCB.
National Bank of Greece	1975	2021	Liquidated.
(Lebanon) Bank Audi	2005	2021	Acquired by Fabmisr.
(Lebanon) BLOM Bank	1977	2021	Acquired by Bank ABC.

== See also ==
- List of largest banks in Africa
