= List of banks in Egypt =

List of banks in Egypt shows a list format description of the banks currently, or at some recent time, existing within Egypt

== Banks Registered with the Central Bank of Egypt ==
1. National Bank of Egypt
2. Banque Misr
3. Commercial International Bank (CIB)
4. Housing and Development Bank
5. Banque du Caire
6. Suez Canal Bank
7. Alexbank
8. Agricultural Bank of Egypt
9. Egyptian Arab Land Bank
10. Industrial Development Bank of Egypt
11. Export Development Bank of Egypt
12. The United Bank of Egypt
13. Arab African Internatıonal Bank
14. Arab International Bank
15. Arab Investment Bank (AIB)
16. Emirates NBD
17. Abu Dhabi Islamic Bank (ADIB)
18. Abu Dhabi Commercial Bank - Egypt
19. First Abu Dhabi Bank (FAB)
20. Citibank Egypt
21. Mashreq Bank
22. Al Ahli Bank of Kuwait - Egypt (ABK-Egypt)
23. National Bank of Kuwait - Egypt (NBK-Egypt)
24. QNB Egypt
25. Saib Bank
26. Credit Agricole Egypt
27. Kuwait Finance House
28. American Express Egypt
29. Faisal Islamic Bank of Egypt
30. Al Baraka Bank Egypt
31. Egyptian Gulf Bank (EG BANK)
32. Bank ABC
33. Arab Bank Egypt
34. Attijariwafa Bank Egypt
35. onebank S.A.E. (First Digital Bank in Egypt)

== Banks with special legislation ==
1. National Investment Bank
2. Nasser Social Bank

== Banks that ceased operations in Egypt ==
1. Barclays Egypt sold to Attijariwafa Bank.
2. Bank of Nova Scotia sold to Arab African Internatıonal Bank.
3. BNP Paribas Egypt sold to Emirates NBD.
4. Piraeus Bank Egypt sold to Al Ahli Bank Of Kuwait.
5. Bank Audi Sold to First Abu Dhabi Bank.
6. Blom Bank Sold to Bank ABC.
7. National Bank of Greece (obtained an approval to commence in the processes of ceasing operations in Egypt.)
8. National Bank of Oman (obtained an approval to commence in the processes of ceasing operations in Egypt.)

== See also ==
- List of banks in Africa
- List of banks in the Arab world
- Central Bank of Egypt
