= List of banks in the Arab world =

The following is a list of banks in the Arab World. The modern system of Arab banks was created in Egypt in the late 19th century, with the campaign of modernizing the country. Today Arab banks are among the most pioneering in Developing countries, and some are competitors to major international banks. A new system of banking has also been introduced by the Arab World, to suit its Islamic laws regarding the creation of wealth, thus Islamic banks were created.

== Algeria ==
=== Central bank ===
- Bank of Algeria

=== Commercial Private Banks ===
- Citibank Algéria
- Banque AlBaraka Algérie
- Bank ABC
- Natixis Banque Algérie
- Société Générale Algérie
- BNP Paribas El DJAZAÏR
- Arab Bank Algeria
- Trust Bank Algéria
- Gulf Bank Algeria
- Housing Bank For Trade And Finance Algeria
- Fransabank El DJAZAÏR
- Calyon Algérie
- Al Salam Bank Algeria
- HSBC Algeria
- Ziraatbank Algérie

== Bahrain ==
=== Central bank ===
- Central Bank of Bahrain

=== Retail Conventional Banks ===
- Ahli United Bank B.S.C.
- Arab Bank PLC
- Bahrain Development Bank B.S.C. BBK
- BMI Bank B.S.C (c)
- BNP Paribas
- Citibank Bahrain
- Credit Libanais SAL
- Eskan Bank
- Future Bank B.S.C. (c)
- Habib Bank Limited
- HSBC Bank Middle East Limited
- ICICI Bank Limited
- MashreqBank psc
- National Bank of Abu Dhabi (Bahrain Branch) National Bank of Bahrain BSC
- National Bank of Kuwait S.A.K. Rafidain Bank
- Standard Chartered Bank
- State Bank of India
- The Housing Bank for Trade and Finance - Jordan United Bank Limited

=== Wholesale Conventional Banks ===
- Addax Bank B.S.C (c)
- Allied Bank Limited
- Alubaf Arab International Bank (Bahrain) B.S.C. (c)
- Arab Bank plc
- Bank ABC
- Arab Investment Company S.A.A.(The)
- Arab Petroleum Investments Corporation APICORP
- Askari Bank Limited
- Awal Bank B.S.C. (c)
- Bahrain Arab International Bank (BAIB) Under liquidation
- Bahrain International Bank E.C. Under liquidation
- Bahrain Middle East Bank B.S.C.
- Bank Alfalah Limited
- Bank Al Habib Limited
- Bank of Baroda
- BNP Paribas
- BNP Paribas 3U
- Cairo Amman Bank
- Canara Bank
- Capital Union E.C. ( c ) Under liquidation
- Citibank Bahrain
- Citicorp Banking Corporation
- Denizbank A.S.
- Finansbank A.S.
- Gulf International Bank B.S.C.
- Gulf Investment Corporation
- Gulf One Investment Bank B.S.C ( c )
- Habib Bank Limited
- HDFC Bank
- HSBC Bank Middle East Limited
- ING Bank A.S.
- International Bank for Commerce Under liquidation
- Investcorp Bank B.S.C.
- JPMorgan Chase Bank, N.A.
- JS Bank Limited
- Korea Exchange Bank
- Kuwait Asia Bank E.C. Under liquidation
- Malayan Banking Berhad Maybank
- MCB Bank Limited
- National Bank of Abu Dhabi
- National Bank of Pakistan
- Philippine National Bank
- Saudi National Commercial Bank (The)
- Securities & Investment Company B.S.C ( c )
- Standard Chartered Bank
- State Bank of India
- TAIB Bank B.S.C. (c)
- The Bank of Tokyo-Mitsubishi UFJ Ltd.
- The International Banking Corporation B.S.C. (c)
- Turk Ekonomi Bankasi Under liquidation
- Turkiye Halk Bankasi A.S
- Turkiye Is Bankasi A.S.
- UBS Global Asset Management (UK) Ltd.
- United Gulf Bank (B.S.C) E.C.
- Vakifbank Turkiye Vakiflar Bankasi
- Woori Bank
- Yapi ve Kredi Bankasi A.S.

=== Retail Islamic Banks ===
- Al Baraka Islamic Bank B.S.C. ( c )
- Al-Salam Bank -Bahrain B.S.C.
- Bahrain Islamic Bank B.S.C.
- Ithmaar Bank B.S.C.
- Khaleeji Commercial Bank B.S.C.
- Kuwait Finance House (Bahrain) B.S.C. (c)

=== Wholesale Islamic Banks ===
- ABC Islamic Bank (E.C.)
- Al Baraka Banking Group B.S.C. (c)
- Arab Islamic Bank (E.C)
- Bank Al-Khair B.S.C. ( c )
- Citi Islamic Investment Bank E.C.
- First Energy Bank B.S.C. ( c )
- GFH Financial Group (B.S.C) E.C.
- Global Banking Corporation BSC ( c )
- Ibdar Bank B.S.C.
- International Investment Bank B.S.C (c)
- Investment Dar Bank B.S.C ( c )
- Investors Bank B.S.C. (c)
- Kuwait Turkish Participation Bank Inc.
- Liquidity Management Centre B.S.C (c)
- RA Bahrain B.S.C. ( c )
- Seera Investment Bank B.S.C ( c )
- Turkiye Finans Katilim Banakasi A.S.
- Venture Capital Bank B.S.C (c)

== Comoros ==
=== Central bank ===
- Central Bank of the Comoros (Banque Centrale des Comores)

=== Development banks ===
- Banque de Développement des Comores

=== Commercial banks ===
- Banque pour l'Industrie et le Commerce des Comores
- Exim Bank Comores Ltd
- Société Nationale des Postes et des Services Financiers

=== Networks of mutual savings ===
- Mutuelles d'épargne et crédit des Comores
- Sanduk

Sources:

- https://web.archive.org/web/20120220134155/http://www.portalino.it/banks/_km.htm
- https://web.archive.org/web/20081218091525/http://www.afdb.org/pls/portal/docs/PAGE/ADB_ADMIN_PG/DOCUMENTS/FINANCIALINFORMATION/COMOROS.PDF
- https://web.archive.org/web/20120312060035/http://www.thecitizen.co.tz/newe.php?id=6437

== Djibouti ==
=== Central bank ===
- National Bank of Djibouti or (Banque Nationale de Djibouti)

=== Commercial banks ===
- Banque Al Baraka Djibouti
- Banque de Djibouti et du Moyen Orient SA
- Banque Indosuez Mer Rouge
- Banque pour le Commerce et l'Industrie - Mer Rouge
- British Bank of Middle-East
- Banque de dépôt de l'Ethiopie
- Banque d'Epargne de la Somalie
- Caisse de Développement
- International Commercial Bank
- Salam African Bank

Sources:

- https://web.archive.org/web/20120220134203/http://www.portalino.it/banks/_dj.htm
- https://web.archive.org/web/20100108124401/http://www.muslimtrade.net/tradeguideline/djibouti/
- http://allafrica.com/stories/200812290109.html

== Egypt ==
=== Central bank ===
- Central Bank of Egypt (Al-Bank al-Markazī al-Masrī)

=== Banks ===
1. National Bank of Egypt
2. Banque Misr
3. Commercial International Bank (CIB)
4. Housing and Development Bank
5. Banque du Caire
6. Suez Canal Bank
7. Alexbank
8. Agricultural Bank of Egypt
9. Egyptian Arab Land Bank
10. Industrial Development Bank of Egypt
11. Export Development Bank of Egypt
12. The United Bank of Egypt
13. Arab African Internatıonal Bank
14. Arab International Bank
15. Arab Investment Bank (AIB)
16. Emirates NBD
17. Abu Dhabi Islamic Bank (ADIB)
18. ADCB
19. Fabmisr
20. Citibank Egypt
21. Mashreq Bank
22. Al Ahli Bank of Kuwait - Egypt (ABK-Egypt)
23. National Bank of Kuwait - Egypt (NBK-Egypt)
24. QNB Egypt
25. Saib Bank
26. Credit Agricole Egypt
27. Kuwait Finance House
28. Faisal Islamic Bank of Egypt
29. Al Baraka Bank Egypt
30. Egyptian Gulf Bank (EG BANK)
31. Bank ABC
32. Arab Bank Egypt
33. Attijariwafa Bank Egypt
34. onebank S.A.E.

== Iraq ==
=== Central bank ===
- Central Bank of Iraq

=== State-owned banks ===
- Rafidain Bank
- Rasheed Bank
- Industrial Bank
- Agricultural Cooperative Bank of Iraq
- Real Estate Bank of Iraq
- Bank of Iraq
- Trade Bank of Iraq

=== Private banks ===
- Al Qurtas Islamic Bank for Investment and Finance (QIB)
- International Development Bank of Iraq (IDB)
- Ashur International Bank for Investment
- FIRST IRAQI BANK
- Albaraka Bank Turkey
- Kurdistan International Bank
- Ghana Bank
- Babylon Bank
- Bank of Baghdad
- Basrah International Bank for Investment
- Commercial Bank of Iraq
- Credit Bank of Iraq
- Dar Es Salaam Investment Bank
- Dijlah & Furat Bank
- Economy Bank Iraq
- Gulf Commercial Bank
- Taawen Islamic Bank
- Industrial Union Investment Bank
- Investment Bank of Iraq
- Iraqi Middle East Investment Bank
- Islamic Bank
- Mosul Bank
- National Bank of Iraq
- North Bank
- Sumer Bank
- Union Bank of Iraq
- Bank Audi
- ِWorld Islamic Bank
- ِElaf Islamic Bank
- United Investment Bank
- Al Janoob Islamic Bank
- T.C. Ziraat Bankasi of Turkey (the Turkish state agricultural bank)
- Bank Mili Iran (the national bank of Iran)
- Byblos Bank (Lebanese)

=== International banks ===
Standard Chartered Bank

== Jordan ==
- Bank ABC
- Arab Bank
- Al Rajhi Bank
- Audi Bank
- Bank of Jordan
- Blom Bank
- Cairo Amman Bank
- Capital Bank of Jordan
- Central Bank of Jordan
- Citibank
- Egyptian Arab Land Bank
- HSBC
- Islamic International Arab Bank
- Investbank
- Jordan Ahli Bank
- Jordan Commercial Bank
- Jordan Dubai Islamic Bank
- Jordan Islamic Bank
- Jordan Kuwait Bank
- National Bank of Kuwait
- National Bank of Abu Dhabi
- Rafidain Bank
- Société Générale
- Standard Chartered
- The Housing Bank for Trade and Finance
- Jordan Islamic Bank
- Union Bank

== Kuwait ==
=== Central Bank ===
- Central Bank of Kuwait
- Kuwait Credit Bank

=== Local Banks ===
- National Bank of Kuwait
- Gulf Bank of Kuwait
- Commercial Bank of Kuwait
- Al Ahli Bank of Kuwait
- Ahli United Bank Kuwait
- Kuwait International Bank
- Burgan Bank
- Kuwait Finance House
- Boubyan Bank
- Warba Bank
- The Industrial Bank of Kuwait

=== Foreign Banks ===
- Bank of Bahrain and Kuwait
- HSBC Bank Middle East
- BNP Paribas
- Citibank N.A. Kuwait
- Mashreq Bank
- First Abu Dhabi Bank
- Doha Bank
- Qatar National Bank
- Al-Rajhi Bank
- Bank Muscat
- Industrial and Commercial Bank of China

== Lebanon ==
=== Central bank ===
- Banque du Liban

=== Major banks ===
- Bank Audi
- Bank of Beirut S.A.L.
- BankMed
- Banque Libano-Française S.A.L.
- BLOM Bank
- Byblos Bank
- Credit Libanais
- Federal Bank of Lebanon S.A.L.
- Fransabank
- Citibank, N.A.
- Intercontinental Bank of Lebanon

=== Other banks ===
- B.L.C. Bank S.A.L.
- Al-Mawarid Bank S.A.L.
- Arab Investment Bank S.A.L.
- Bank Al Madina S.A.L.
- Banque BEMO S.A.L.
- Banque de la Bekaa S.A.L.
- Banque de l'Habitat S.A.L.
- Banque de l'Industrie Et Du Travail S.A.L.
- Banque Lati S.A.L.
- Banque Misr Liban S.A.L.
- Bank of Beirut and the Arab Countries
- Creditbank
- FFA Private Bank
- Finance Bank S.A.L.
- First National Bank (Lebanon)
- MEAB S.A.L.
- Méditerranée Investment Bank S.A.L.
- Near East Commercial Bank S.A.L.
- Société Générale de Banque au Liban

=== Foreign banks ===
- Arab Finance House S.A.L.
- Banca Di Roma S.P.A
- Bank of Kuwait And The Arab World S.A.L.
- Banque Nationale de Paris "Intercontinentale"
- HSBC Bank Middle East
- Intercontinental Bank of Lebanon S.A.L.
- Standard Chartered Bank S.A.L.
- Lebanese Canadian Bank S.A.L.
- Lebanese Islamic Bank S.A.L.
- Lebanese Swiss Bank S.A.L.
- Lebanon & Gulf Bank S.A.L.
- Banque de Syrie et du Liban
- Syrian Lebanese Commercial Bank S.A.L.
- National Bank of Kuwait

== Libya ==
=== Central bank ===
- Central Bank of Libya

=== Banks ===
- Alsaraya Trading And Development Bank
- Aman Bank for Commerce & Development
- Al-Wafa Bank
- Alejmaa Alarabi Bank
- Banque Sahélo-Saharienne pour l'Investissement et le Commerce
- Jamahiriya Bank
- Libyan Arab Foreign Bank
- Libyan Development Bank
- Mediterranean Bank
- National Agricultural Bank of Libya
- National Banking Corporation
- National Commercial Bank
- Sahara Bank
- Savings and Real Estate Bank of Libya
- Tripoli Agricultural Bank
- Umma Bank
- Wahda Bank

Sources:

- https://web.archive.org/web/20130818143800/http://www.portalino.it/banks/_ly.htm
- List of Libyan Banks
- http://www.cbl.gov.ly/en/variant/index.php?cid=102

== Mauritania ==
=== Central bank ===
- Central Bank of Mauritania or (Banque Centrale de Mauritanie)

=== Banks ===
- Banque Arabe Africaine en Mauritanie
- Banque Arabe Libyenne Mauritanienne pour le Commerce Extérieur
- Banque Internationale pour la Mauritanie
- Banque Mauritanienne Nationale
- Banque Mauritanienne pour le Commerce International
- Banque Mauritanienne pour le Développement et le Commerce
- Banque Mondiale en Mauritanie
- Caisse Centrale de Coopération Économique
- Chinguitty Bank
- Generale de Banque de Mauritanie pour l'Investissement et le Commerce
- Union de Banques de Development

Source: https://web.archive.org/web/20130818113312/http://www.portalino.it/banks/_mr.htm

== Morocco ==
=== Central bank ===
- Bank Al-Maghrib

=== Major banks ===
- Attijariwafa Bank (born by the fusion of Banque Commerciale du Maroc and Wafabank)
- Banque Marocaine du Commerce Extérieur (BMCE Bank)
- Crédit Agricole du Maroc
- Groupe Banque Populaire
- Crédit Immobilier et Hôtelier (CIH Bank)
- Banque Marocaine pour le Commerce et l'Industrie (BMCI)
- Société Générale Morocco
- Crédit du Maroc
- Al Barid Bank

=== Investment banks ===
- Casablanca Finance Group
- Attijari Finances Corp.
- BMCE Capital
- CDG Capital
- Capital Trust Maroc

=== Other banks ===
- ABN AMRO Maroc
- Arab Bank Maroc
- Banco Immobiliario y Mercantil de Marruecos
- Bank Al Amal
- Banque Marocaine pour l'Afrique et l'Orient
- Banque Nationale pour le Développement Économique
- Bex-Maroc
- Citibank
- Commerzbank
- Crédit Populaire du Maroc
- Limar Bank Casa Union Marocaine de Banques
- Raw-Mat Bank
- Société de Banque & de Crédit
- Société Marocaine de Depôt et de Crédit
- Société Mithaq Al Maghrib
- Union Bancaria Hispano Marroqui Uniban
- Union Marocaine des Banques

== Qatar ==
- Qatar Central Bank
- The Commercial Bank of Qatar
- Arab Bank
- Qatar National Bank
- Habib Bank Ltd
- Standard Chartered Bank
- International Bank of Qatar
- Masraf Al Rayan
- Qatar Islamic Bank
- Qatar International Islamic Bank
- HSBC
- Bank Saderat Iran
- United Bank Limited
- Qatar Development Bank
- al khaliji Commercial Bank
- Doha Bank
- Mashreq Bank
- Ahli Bank
- BNP Paribas
- Barwa Bank
- State Bank of India
- Charanjeet bank

== Syria ==
=== Central bank ===
- Central Bank of Syria

=== Public banks ===
- Agricultural Cooperative Bank (Syria)
- Commercial Bank of Syria
- Industrial Bank of Syria
- National Microfinance Bank
- Popular Credit Bank
- Real-Estate Bank
- Saving Bank

=== Private and Foreign banks ===
- Arab Bank
- Bank Audi
- Bank of Jordan
- Bank of Syria and Overseas
- Banque BEMO Saudi Fransi
- Byblos Bank
- Fransabank
- Qatar National Bank
- Syria Gulf Bank
- The International Bank for Trade & Finance

=== Islamic banks ===
- Al Baraka Bank
- Cham Bank
- National Islamic Bank
- Syria International Islamic Bank

== Somalia ==
=== Central bank ===
- Central Bank of Somalia

=== Development bank ===
- Somali Development Bank

=== Commercial banks ===
- National Bank of Somalia
- Commercial and Savings Bank of Somalia
- Somali Commercial Bank
- Al Barakaat Bank, Mogadishu
- Dalsan Bank
- Universal Bank of Somalia (UBSOM)

Sources:

- https://web.archive.org/web/20110728040758/http://somalbanca.org/home.html
- Central Bank of Somalia
- http://www.nbos.org/
- https://web.archive.org/web/20130818115746/http://www.portalino.it/banks/_so.htm

== Sudan ==
=== Central bank ===
- Central Bank of Sudan

Source: http://www.cbos.gov.sd

=== Commercial banks ===
- Agricultural Bank of Sudan
- Al-Baraka Bank
- Al Shimal Islamic Bank
- Animal Resources Bank
- Arab Bank for Economic Development in Africa
- Arab Sudanese Bank
- Bank of Khartoum
- Bank of Oman
- Banque Sahélo-Saharienne pour l'Investissement et le Commerce
- Blue Nile Bank
- Chase Manhattan Bank
- Citibank
- El Nilein Bank
- Expetriate Bank
- Faisal Islamic Bank
- Financial Investment Bank
- Habib Bank
- Industrial Bank of Sudan
- International Bank for Reconstruction and Development
- Ivory Bank
- Islamic Bank for Western Sudan
- Islamic Co-operative Development Bank
- Khartoum Bank
- Mashreq Bank
- Middle East Bank
- National Bank of Abu Dhabi
- National Bank of Sudan
- National Development Bank
- National Export/Import Bank
- Nilein Bank
- People Co-operative Bank
- Saudian Sudanese Bank
- Sudan Agricultural Bank
- Sudan Commercial Bank
- Sudanese Baraka Bank
- Sudanese Estates Bank
- Sudanese French Bank
- Sudanese International Bank
- Sudanese Islamic Bank
- Sudanese National Bank
- Sudanese Saudian Bank
- Sudanese Savings Bank
- Tadamon Islamic Bank
- Unity Bank
- Union Trust Bank

Source: https://web.archive.org/web/20130818113227/http://www.portalino.it/banks/_sd.htm

== Tunisia ==
=== Central bank ===
- Central Bank of Tunisia (Banque Centrale de Tunisie) ( http://www.bct.gov.tn )

=== Banks ===
- Alubaf International Bank
- Amen Bank
- Bank ABC
- Arab Tunisian Bank
- Bankers Trust Company
- Banque Arabe Tuniso Libyenne de Développement et le Commerce Extérieur
- Banque de Coopération du Maghreb Arabe
- Banque de Développement Économique de Tunisie
- Banque de l'Habitat
- Banque de Tunisie
- Banque de Tunisie et des Emirats d'Investissement
- Banque du Sud
- Banque Franco Tunisienne
- Banque Internationale Arabe de Tunisie
- Banque Nationale Agricole
- Banque Nationale de Développement Touristique
- Banque Nationale de Tunisie
- Banque Tuniso Qatarie d'Investissement
- Banque Tuniso-Koweitienne de Développement
- Beit Ettamwil Tounsi Saudi
- Citibank
- Credit Foncier et Commercial de Tunisie
- North Africa International Bank
- Societe Tunisienne de Banque
- Tunis International Bank
- Union Bancaire pour le Commerce et l'Industrie
- Union Internationale de Banque
- Union Tunisienne de Banques

Source: https://web.archive.org/web/20130818112145/http://www.portalino.it/banks/_tn.htm

== United Arab Emirates ==
=== Central Bank ===
- Central Bank of the United Arab Emirates

=== Major commercial banks ===
- Abu Dhabi Commercial Bank
- First Abu Dhabi Bank (formerly FGB)
- National Bank of Abu Dhabi
- Emirates NBD
- Abu Dhabi Investment Authority
- MashreqBank
- American Express Bank Limited
- Bank of America
- Bank of China
- Bank of India
- Citibank United Arab Emirates
- Indian Bank
- JPMorgan Chase
- ABN AMRO
- Scotiabank
- Credit Suisse
- Deutsche Bank
- Fortis Bank
- National Bank of Kuwait
- Royal Bank of Scotland
- Arab Bank
- Bank of New York
- Hang Seng Bank
- ICICI Bank
- Royal Bank of Canada
- State Bank of India
- Toronto Dominion Bank
- Central Bank of India
- Axis Bank
- Bank Melli Iran
- Bank Saderat Iran
- Gulf Commercial Bank
- Bank of Jordan
- Allied Bank
- Standard Chartered
- Bank of Baroda
- HSBC Bank Middle East
- Habib Bank
- United Bank
- RAKBANK
- Commercial Bank of Dubai
- Invest Bank
- Gulf Merchant Bank
- Commercial Bank International
- Union National Bank

=== Islamic banks ===
- Ajman Bank
- Al Hilal Bank
- Dubai Islamic Bank
- Emirates Islamic Bank
- Sharjah Islamic Bank
- Abu Dhabi Islamic Bank
- Islamic Commercial Bank
- Noor Islamic Bank

=== Defunct or merged banks ===
- Bank of Credit and Commerce International

== Yemen ==
- National Bank of Yemen
- SABAA ISLAMIC BANK
- Shamil Bank of Yemen and Bahrain
- Yemen Kuwait Bank for Trade and Investment
