= 123 (interbank network) =

Egyptian Banks Co. for Technological Advancement, SAE
- Trade name: 123
- Industry: Banking
- Headquarters: Egypt

"123" is a shared cash network for the banking community in Egypt. It is provided by Egyptian Banks Co. for Technological Advancement (EBC).

== Services ==
The "123" network links more than 30 Egyptian Banks supporting more than 1500 ATMs distributed all over Egypt. This network provides the banks' clients with direct access to their different accounts at any time and from anywhere through the ATMs carrying the "123" logo. This network is available 24 hours a day 7 days a week.

In addition, the "123" network is a gateway to MasterCard, Diners Club and American Express International networks. Moreover, it is linked to regional networks in the Persian Gulf states, NAPS in State of Qatar, Benefit in Kingdom of Bahrain and CSCBank SAL in Lebanon.

Benefits:

- Convenience
- Security
- Helping to promote a cashless society
- Enhanced debit and credit services
- Source of revenue to banks

== Member banks in the network ==
1. Arab African Internatıonal Bank
2. Alexbank
3. Alexandria Commercial & Maritime Bank
4. Arab Bank Egypt
5. Bank ABC
6. Banque du Caire
7. Banque Misr
8. Cairo Far East Bank
9. Commercial International Bank
10. Crédit Agricole Egypt
11. National Bank of Abu Dhabi
12. Delta International Bank
13. Egyptian ARAB Land Bank
14. Export Development Bank
15. Egyptian Gulf Bank
16. Egyptian Saudi Finance Bank
17. Faisal Islamic Bank of Egypt
18. Housing & Development Bank
19. HSBC Bank Egypt
20. Misr Iran Development Bank
21. National Bank for Development
22. Saib Bank
23. United Bank Of Egypt
24. Al Watany Bank of Egypt
25. Egypt Post
26. National Bank of Egypt
