= List of largest banks in Africa =

This is the list of the banks in Africa, as measured by total assets.

== By total assets ==
The list is based on the April 2025 African Business report of the 100 largest banks in Africa.

Rank	Bank name	Country	Total assets (US$ Millions)
1	Standard Bank	South Africa	220 640
2	FirstRand	South Africa	164 190
3	National Bank of Egypt	Egypt	156 891
4	Absa Bank	South Africa	137 230
5	Nedbank	South Africa	100 120
6	Attijariwafa Bank	Morocco	85 840
7	Banque Misr	Egypt	78 000
8	BCP Group	Morocco	54 000
9	Banque Nationale d'Algérie	Algeria	45 000
10	Bank of Africa	Morocco	42 000
11	Investec	South Africa	35 890
12	Ecobank	Togo	34 487
13	Banque Extérieure d'Algérie	Algeria	34 000
14	Access Bank Group	Nigeria	30 420
15	Commercial Bank of Ethiopia	Ethiopia	25 000
16	Crédit Populaire d'Algérie	Algeria	25 000
17	Commercial International Bank	Egypt	23 406
18	United Bank for Africa	Nigeria	22 570
19	Zenith Bank	Nigeria	22 310
20	First Bank of Nigeria	Nigeria	20 260
21	Mauritius Commercial Bank	Mauritius	19 000
22	Arab African Internatıonal Bank	Egypt	18 200
23	QNB Egypt	Egypt	17 913
24	KCB Group	Kenya	15 000
25	Crédit Agricole du Maroc	Morocco	14 000
26	CIH Bank	Morocco	14 000
27	Equity Bank Group	Kenya	14 000
28	Guaranty Trust Bank	Nigeria	13 230
29	Saham Bank	Morocco	13 000
30	Capitec Bank	South Africa	12 722
31	Banque de développement local	Algeria	12 000
32	Banque du Caire	Egypt	10 272
33	Fabmisr	Egypt	9 180
34	BGFIBank Group	Gabon	9 000
35	Vista Bank Group	Burkina Faso	9 000
36	BMCI	Morocco	8 000
37	Banque Nationale Agricole	Tunisia	8 000
38	Banque Internationale Arabe de Tunisie	Tunisia	8 000
39	Fidelity Bank Nigeria	Nigeria	7 490
40	Abu Dhabi Islamic Bank	Egypt	7 300
41	Crédit du Maroc	Morocco	7 000
42	State Bank of Mauritius	Mauritius	7 000
43	CRDB Bank	Tanzania	7 000
44	Société Générale Côte d'Ivoire	Ivory Coast	6 749
45	Rawbank	(Democratic Republic of the Congo) D. R. of the Congo	6 570
46	Co-operative Bank of Kenya	Kenya	6 000
47	NMB Bank Tanzania	Tanzania	6 000
48	AfrAsia Bank Limited	Mauritius	6 000
49	Suez Canal Bank	Egypt	5 700
50	HSBC Bank Egypt	Egypt	5 463
51	Faisal Islamic Bank of Egypt	Egypt	5 400
52	First City Monument Bank	Nigeria	5 250
53	I&M Holdings Limited	Kenya	5 170
54	Stanbic IBTC Holdings	Nigeria	5 150
55	Equity BCDC	(Democratic Republic of the Congo) D. R. of the Congo	5 100
56	Housing and Development Bank	Egypt	5 100
57	Banco Angolano de Investimentos	Angola	5 000
58	Awash Bank	Ethiopia	5 000
59	BH Bank (Tunisia)	Tunisia	5 000
60	Société Tunisienne de Banque	Tunisia	5 000
61	Emirates NBD	Egypt	4 978
62	Coris Bank	Burkina Faso	4 900
63	AFG Bank	Ivory Coast	4 900
64	Arab Bank Egypt	Egypt	4 900
65	Arab International Bank	Egypt	4 626
66	Alexbank	Egypt	4 512
67	Export Development Bank	Egypt	4 400
68	Agricultural Bank of Egypt	Egypt	4 360
69	National Bank of Kuwait (Egypt)	Egypt	4 260
70	Banco de Fomento Angola	Angola	4 000
71	NCBA Group	Kenya	4 000
72	Diamond Trust Bank Group	Kenya	4 000
73	Absa Bank Kenya	Kenya	4 000
74	Attijari Bank	Tunisia	4 000
75	Bank of Abyssinia	Ethiopia	4 000
76	Banco Comercial e de Investimentos	Mozambique	4 000
77	Amen Bank	Tunisia	4 000
78	Société Générale Algérie	Algeria	3 859
79	African Bank Limited	South Africa	3 531
80	Ecobank Nigeria	Nigeria	3 525
81	Al Ahli Bank of Kuwait	Egypt	3 374
82	ADCB	Egypt	3 338
83	Saib Bank	Egypt	3 260
84	Union Bank of Nigeria	Nigeria	3 130
85	Crédit Agricole Egypt	Egypt	3 100
86	Kuwait Finance House	Egypt	3 044
87	Stanbic Holdings Plc	Kenya	3 000
88	NSIA Banque	Ivory Coast	3 000
89	Dashen Bank	Ethiopia	3 000
90	Millennium bim	Mozambique	3 000
91	Development Bank of Ethiopia	Ethiopia	3 000
92	Ecobank Ghana	Ghana	3 000
93	Bank Windhoek	Namibia	3 000
94	Arab Tunisian Bank	Tunisia	3 000
95	Stanbic Bank Uganda	Uganda	3 000
96	Banco BIC	Angola	3 000
97	Standard Chartered	Kenya	3 000
98	Gulf Bank Algeria	Algeria	3 000
99	Société ivoirienne de banque	Ivory Coast	3 000
100	Union Internacionales des banques	Tunisia	2 990

== See also ==
- List of largest banks
- List of largest banks in the Americas
- List of largest banks in North America
- List of largest banks in the United States
- List of largest banks in Southeast Asia
- List of banks in Africa
- List of banks in the Americas
