= National Société Générale Bank =

Former Egyptian bank

- Type: Subsidiary
- Industry: Financial services
- Founded: 1978
- Defunct: 2013
- Fate: Acquired by QNB Group
- Successor: QNB (Egypt)
- Headquarters: Cairo, Egypt
- Area served: Egypt
- Parent: Société Générale
- Website: www.societegenerale.eg

National Société Générale Bank, was an Egyptian commercial bank. It was the local subsidiary of Société Générale.

== History ==
Established as Banque Nationale Société Générale in 1978, with a stake held by the National Bank of Egypt.

In September 2005, NSGB acquired a majority stake in Misr International Bank (MIBank), which at the time was one of the largest private banks in the country.

In 2013, the QNB Group acquired a majority stake from Société Générale for US$2 billion. NSGB was subsequently rebranded as QNB Al Ahli (lit. 'QNB National').

== See also ==
- List of banks in Egypt
