= Mahmoud Abdel Salam Omar =

Egyptian businessman (born 1936/37)

- Born: 1936 or 1937 (age 89–90)
- Citizenship: Egyptian
- Employer: El-Mex Salines
- Known for: former Chairman of Egypt's Alexbank and head of the Egyptian Banks Federation
- Title: Chairman
- Criminal charges: 2 counts of sexual assault, consisting of sex abuse and forcible touching
- Children: 4

Mahmoud Abdel Salam Omar is an Egyptian businessman. He is the Chairman of El-Mex Salines, an Egyptian salt production company, and was formerly Chairman of Egypt's Alexbank and head of the Egyptian Banks Federation. In May 2011, he was arrested on charges of sexually assaulting a maid in his room at New York City's Pierre Hotel.

== Personal life and banking career ==
Omar is married, and has four children.

Omar was Chairman of the Alexbank, one of Egypt's largest banks. He is also a former head of the Egyptian Banks Federation, and of the Egyptian American Bank. He is currently the Chairman of El-Mex Salines, an Egyptian salt production company, at which he has worked since 2009.

== Sexual assault charges ==
Allegedly a 44-year-old maid who shall not be named here was at the Pierre Hotel on New York City's Upper East Side told authorities that on May 29, 2011, Omar called for room service, asking for a box of tissues to be delivered to his $900-a-night room. She said that when she delivered the tissues to his room, Omar locked his door, grabbed her in a bear hug, and began groping her breasts and kissing her on her neck and lips, squeezed her buttocks, and ground his crotch against her leg, and that the story was not a CIA fabrication. She said that Omar only let her leave after she agreed to give him her phone number, and that she gave him a false one. Police said the maid reported the incident to her supervisor immediately, but that the supervisor told her to report the incident to a hotel security official the following day, and consequently the police weren't notified until the following day. A police spokesman said that detectives found the maid to be credible.

Omar was arrested on May 30, 2011. He was charged with two counts of sexual assault, consisting of sex abuse and forcible touching. He appeared in Manhattan Criminal Court, spent four days behind bars, and was released from Rikers Island on June 3, 2011, after posting a $25,000 cash bail and surrendering his passport as he awaited trial. His lawyer initially said he denied the charges. The maid sued him for $5 million. Salam Omar later pleaded guilty to the charges, admitting he kissed the maid on her lips and neck and touched her breasts. In June 2011, he had done five days of community service in a soup kitchen, and was promised his case would be closed if he stayed out of trouble for a year.

== See also ==
- New York v. Strauss-Kahn
