= Saib Bank =

Egyptian bank

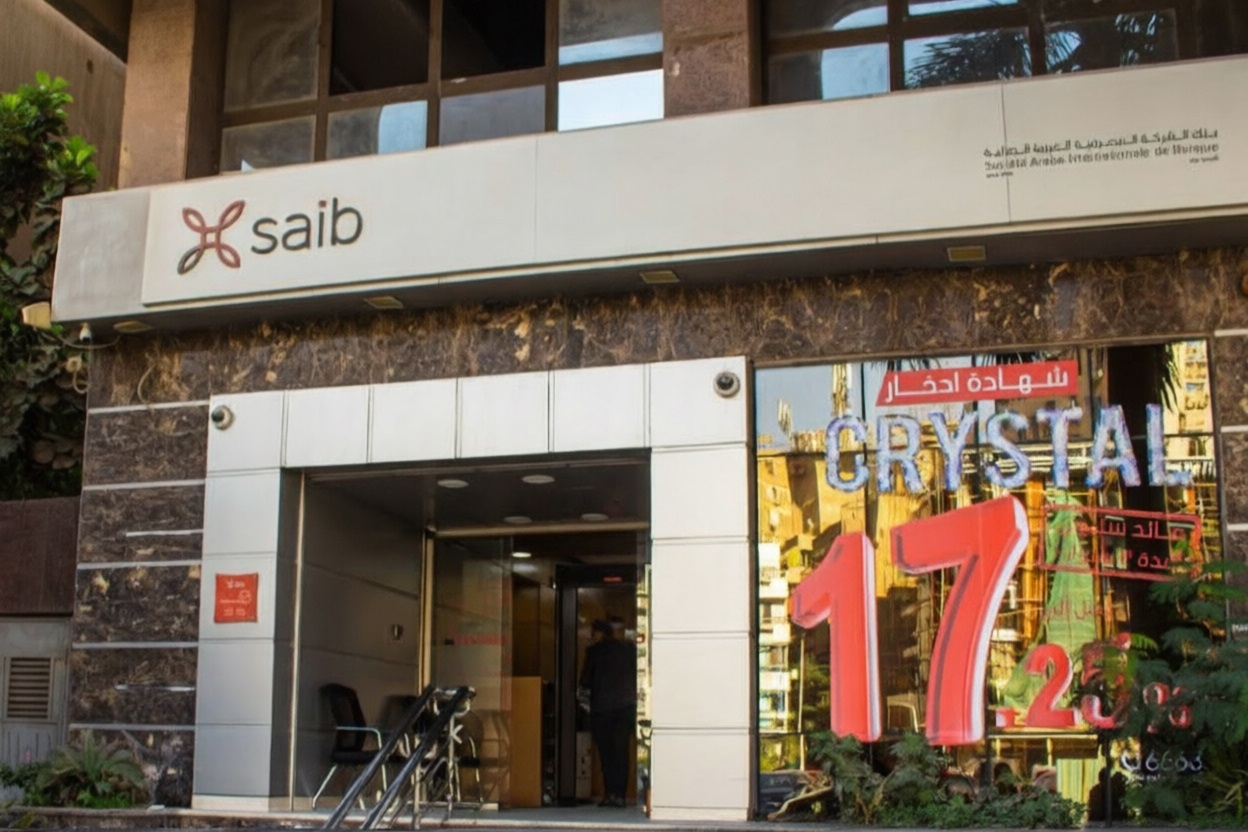
- Saib branch in Cairo
- Native name: بنك الشركة المصرفية العربية الدولية
- Type: Private bank
- Traded as: EGX: SAIB
- ISIN: EGS60081C013
- Industry: Financial services
- Founded: 1976; 50 years ago
- Headquarters: Cairo, Egypt
- Number of locations: 46 (2025)
- Area served: Egypt
- Key people: Afdal Naguib (CEO)
- Services: Banking services
- Total assets: EGP 172 billion (2025) (USD 3,25 billion)
- Number of employees: 1854 (2025)
- Website: www.saib.com.eg

Saib Bank (Société Arabe Internationale de Banque; arabic: بنك الشركة المصرفية العربية الدولية) is a medium-sized Egyptian bank.

== History ==
SAIB Bank was established on March 21, 1976, as the first joint Arab bank operating in Egypt under the provisions of Investment Law No. 43 of 1974 and is subject to the supervision and control of the Central Bank of Egypt. The initial capital was provided by a consortium including the Arab International Bank (AIB), the National Bank of Egypt, and Misr Insurance, alongside several other Arab and international stakeholders.

During the 1990s and early 2000s, saib transitioned from a niche investment-focused bank into a more diversified commercial institution.

During 2010s, The bank historically focused on corporate clients, the bank aggressively expanded its retail division, launching various consumer loan products, credit cards, and digital banking platforms.

In 2019, the bank officially rebranded, adopting the lowercase "saib" as its visual identity. This change aimed to project a more modern, agile, and customer-centric image.

== Shareholders ==
- Arab International Bank (46.08%)
- Arab Contractors for Investments (17.292%)
- Misr Life Insurance (9.75%)
- Public Subscription (15.59%)
- Other Shareholders

== Bank Shareholdings ==
- Cairo Factoring (40.00%)
- Cairo National Securities Brokerage (32.00%)
- International Leasing (20.19%)
- Medcom Aswan Cement (15.68%)
- Credit Risk Guarantee S.A.E. (9.09%)
- Egyptian Takaful Insurance for Property and Liability (8.25%)
- Egyptian Credit Bureau S.A.E. (3.57%)
- Egyptian Mortgage Refinance S.A.E. (2.75%)
- Port Said National Food Security (0.89%)
- Egypt For clearing, deposit, and central registration (0.53%)
- Arab Trade Financing Program (0.038%)
- Development of the East Port Said Free Industrial Zone (percentage unknown)
- Automotive trade boom (percentage unknown)

== See also ==
- List of largest banks in Africa
- Banking in Egypt
