= Export Development Bank =

Egyptian bank

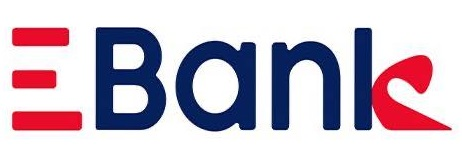

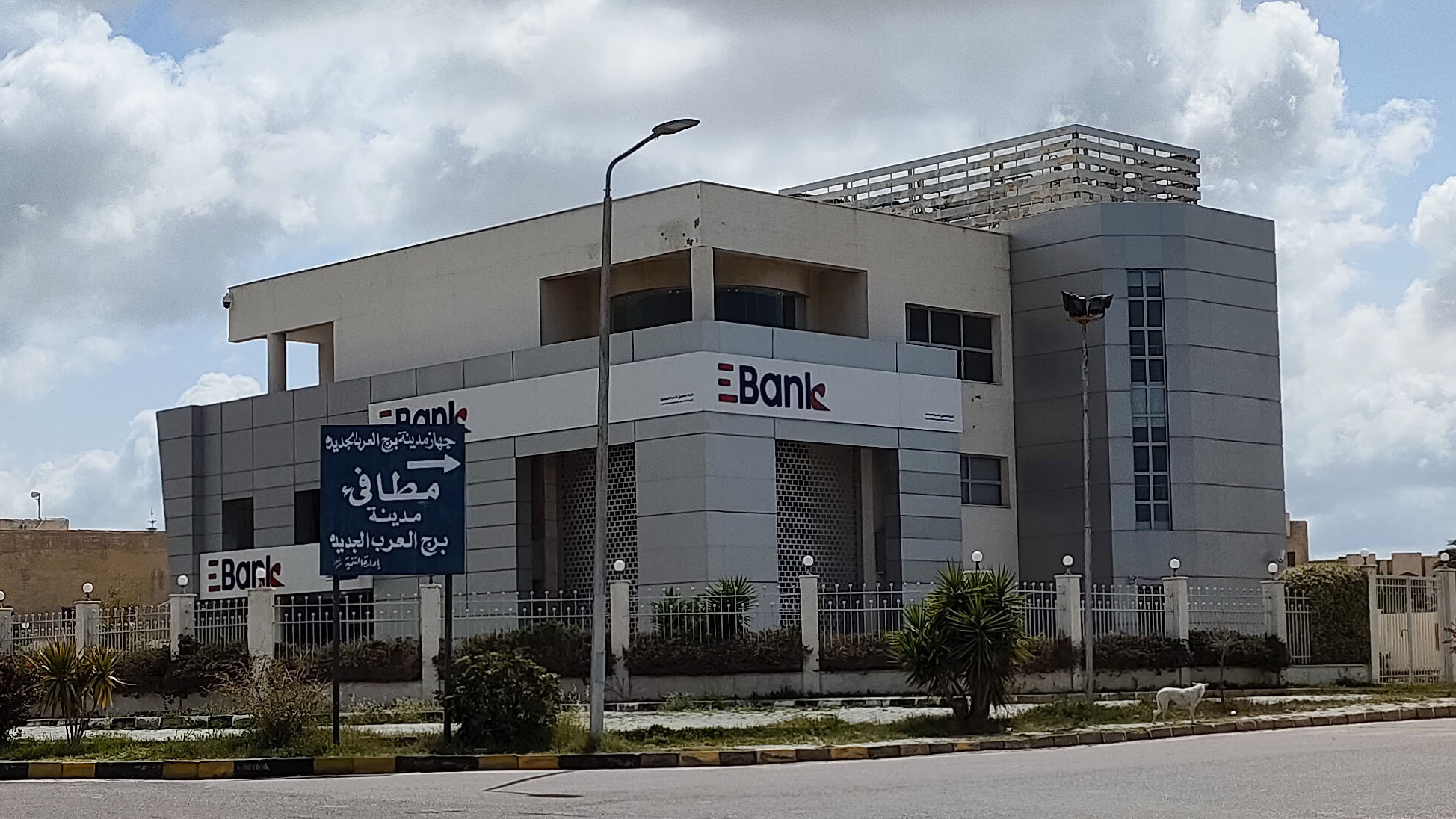
- Agency in New Borg El Arab
- Type: Joint-stock company
- Traded as: EGX: EXPA
- ISIN: EGS60051C013
- Industry: Financial services
- Founded: 1983; 43 years ago
- Headquarters: Cairo, Egypt
- Number of locations: 45 (2025)
- Area served: Egypt
- Key people: Ahmed Galal (CEO)
- Revenue: USD 127 millions (2025)
- Total assets: USD 4,4 billions (2025)
- Number of employees: 1675 (2025)
- Website: ebank.com.eg

Export Development Bank (EBank) is an Egyptian development bank established under Law No. 95 of 1983. Its purpose is to promote Egyptian exports and support the development of an agricultural, industrial, commercial, and service export sector.

== History ==
The bank commenced operations in February 1985 with an authorized capital of EGP 2 billion, which was subsequently increased to EGP 5 billion following Cabinet approval in 2018. The bank was established by the Egyptian government as a financing institution for the development of Egyptian exports, with the objective of fostering this growth and supporting the growth of a robust agricultural, industrial, commercial, and service export sector.

In 2005 when the bank signed an agreement with the International Finance Corporation. This shifted the bank’s focus toward Small and Medium Enterprises (SMEs), recognizing them as the backbone of the Egyptian economy.

== Shareholders ==
The company's shareholdings are distributed as follows:

- Banque Misr (23.13%)
- National Bank of Egypt (19.8%)
- National Investment Bank (40.75%)
- Egyptian Exchange (16.31%) - Free float Services

== Subsidiaries ==
The Export Development Bank of Egypt owns a group of companies, including:

- Egypt Capital Holding (99.99%)
- Beta Financial Holding (99.99%)
- Global Holding for Development and Financial Investments (99.99%)
- Egyptian Export Guarantee Company (70.55%)
- EBE Factor (60.00%)
- Egyptian Real Estate Investments (39.50%)
- A Beta Real Estate Investments (39.50%)
- Egyptian Banks for Technological Advancement S.A.E. (0.92%)
- Egypt Capital Real Estate (0.05%)

== See also ==
- List of largest banks in Africa
