= Fabmisr =

Egyptian bank

FABMISR
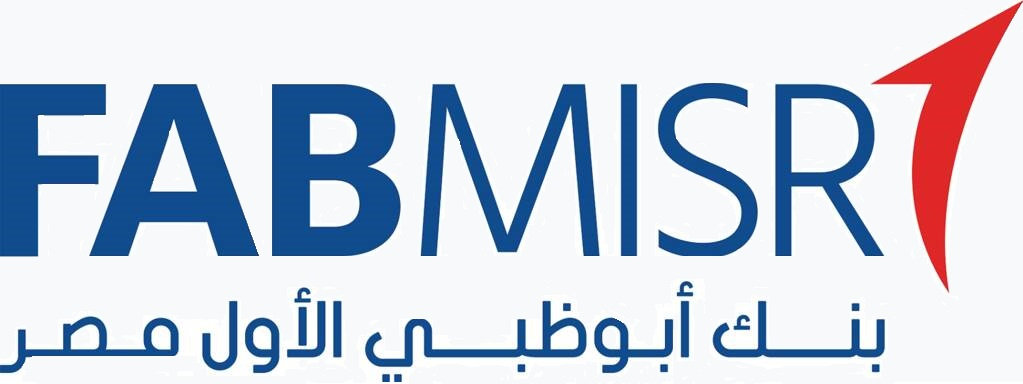

- Headquarters in Cairo
- Company type: Subsidiary
- Industry: Financial services
- Founded: 1975
- Headquarters: Cairo, Egypt
- Number of locations: 74 (2025)
- Area served: Egypt
- Key people: Ahmed Issa (CEO)
- Revenue: EGP 16.7 billion (2025) (USD 316 millions)
- Total assets: EGP 484 billion (2025) (USD 9,18 billions)
- Number of employees: 2377 (2025)
- Parent: First Abu Dhabi Bank
- Website: www.fabmisr.com.eg

FABMISR, is a major Egyptian bank. Subsidiary of First Abu Dhabi Bank. It is the second largest foreign bank operating in Egypt after QNB Egypt.

== History ==
In 1975, The National Bank of Abu Dhabi (NBAD) opened its first overseas branch in Cairo. Focusing heavily on corporate banking.

In April 2017, the National Bank of Abu Dhabi (NBAD) and First Gulf Bank (FGB) merged in the UAE to create First Abu Dhabi Bank (FAB). Following this global merger, the Egyptian operations of NBAD were rebranded as FAB Egypt.

In January 2021, FAB signed a final agreement to acquire 100% of the Egyptian subsidiary of Lebanon’s Bank Audi.

In February 2022, FAB offered to buy EFG Hermes, a finance company. In April, the deal was dropped.

In June 2022, Following the legal merger and approval from the Central Bank of Egypt (CBE), the bank officially launched its new brand identity: FABMISR.

In Early 2026, FAB, along with Commercial International Bank, showed interest in acquiring the retail banking division of HSBC Bank Egypt.

== See also ==
- List of largest banks in Africa
