= National Bank of Kuwait (Egypt) =

Egyptian bank

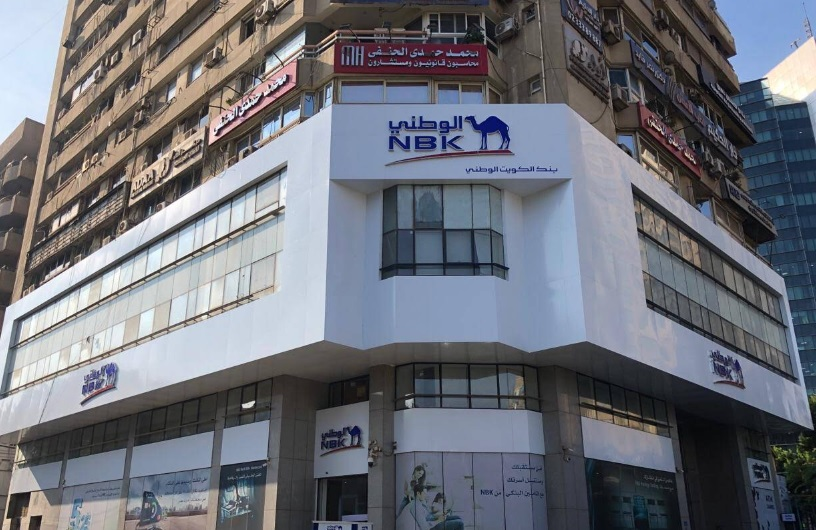
- Headquarters in Cairo
- Company type: Subsidiary
- Traded as: EGX: NBKE
- ISIN: EGS60171C013
- Industry: Banking
- Predecessor: Al Watany Bank
- Founded: 1 May 1980; 46 years ago
- Headquarters: Cairo, Egypt
- Number of locations: 53 (2025)
- Key people: Shaikha Khaled Al-Bahar (Chairman); Yasser Abd El-Koddous El-Tayeb (CEO)
- Products: Financial services
- Revenue: EGP 8 billions (2025) (USD 153 millions)
- Net income: EGP 13,7 billions (2025) (USD 259 millions)
- Total assets: EGP 224 billions (2025) (USD 4,26 billions)
- Total equity: EGP 30,2 billions (2025) (USD 570 millions)
- Number of employees: 2051 (2025)
- Parent: National Bank of Kuwait
- Website: www.nbk.com/egypt/

The National Bank of Kuwait (Egypt) is a medium-sized Egyptian bank, and a subsidiary of the National Bank of Kuwait.

== History ==
In May 1980 Al Watany Bank of Egypt was founded by several Egyptian businessmen as a joint Stock Company under the provisions of Law 43/1974 with two branches in Cairo. It grew in a promising economy and gradually established a reputation as the leading bank for small and medium-size businesses within the Egyptian market.

In August 2007, the National Bank of Kuwait (NBK) acquired a 51% stake in Al Watany for US $516 million. The offer was extended to other shareholders and by October 2007, the National Bank of Kuwait had acquired a total of 93.77% stake in the bank for a cost of over US $900 million by October 2007. The purchase marked the entry of the National Bank of Kuwait into the Egyptian market for the first time and represented a significant stage in the bank's strategy of expansion in the region. The bank intended to triple the number of branches in five years and turn Al Watany into Egypt's third largest retail bank.

The Al Watany Bank of Egypt made a net profit of 243.6 million Egyptian pounds (US $44.5 million) in 2007, a 157% increase compared to 2006. It posted a profit of 290.6 million Egyptian pounds for the first nine months of 2008, a 29.2 percent growth compared to the same period in the previous year. Its assets were valued at 14.6025 billion Egyptian pounds at the end of the third quarter of 2008.

The bank's authorized and paid capital was 1 billion Egyptian Pounds distributed on 100 million shares with a par value of 10 Egyptian Pounds each. It has 41 branches located across Egypt from Cairo and Alexandria to Giza, Mansoura and Sohag.

== See also ==
- List of largest banks in Africa
- Banking in Egypt
