= Crédit Agricole Egypt =

Egyptian bank

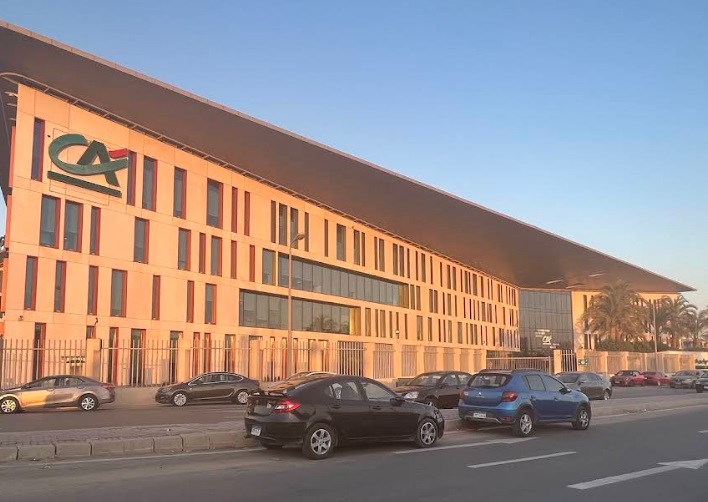
- Headquarters of the Bank
- Company type: Subsidiary
- Traded as: EGX: CIEB
- ISIN: EGS60041C018
- Industry: Financial services
- Founded: 2006
- Headquarters: Cairo, Egypt
- Number of locations: 86 (2025)
- Area served: Egypt
- Key people: Osama Saleh (Chairman); Jean-Pierre Trinelle (CEO)
- Total assets: USD 3,1 billion (2025)
- Number of employees: 2300 (2025)
- Parent: Crédit Agricole
- Website: www.ca-egypt.com

Crédit Agricole Egypt, is a medium-sized Egyptian bank and subsidiary of Crédit Agricole, offers financial services to individuals, businesses, and the rural sector. It has a network of approximately 86 branches and serves over 393,000 customers throughout Egypt.

The bank offers insurance services in partnership with Allianz.

== History ==
Crédit Lyonnais had been present in Egypt since the 1980s. In September 2006, the group decided to merge its local operations (under the Calyon Egypt entity) with the Egyptian American Bank. The Crédit Agricole group gradually increased its stake to reach approximately 65% in 2026.

In April 2022, the French group signed an agreement to sell its majority stake (78.7%) in Crédit du Maroc to the Moroccan group Holmarcom (owned by the Bensalah family). After withdrawing from Morocco, the group chose to strengthen its investments in Egypt.

== See also ==
- List of largest banks in Africa
- Banking in Egypt
