= Suez Canal Bank =

Egyptian Bank

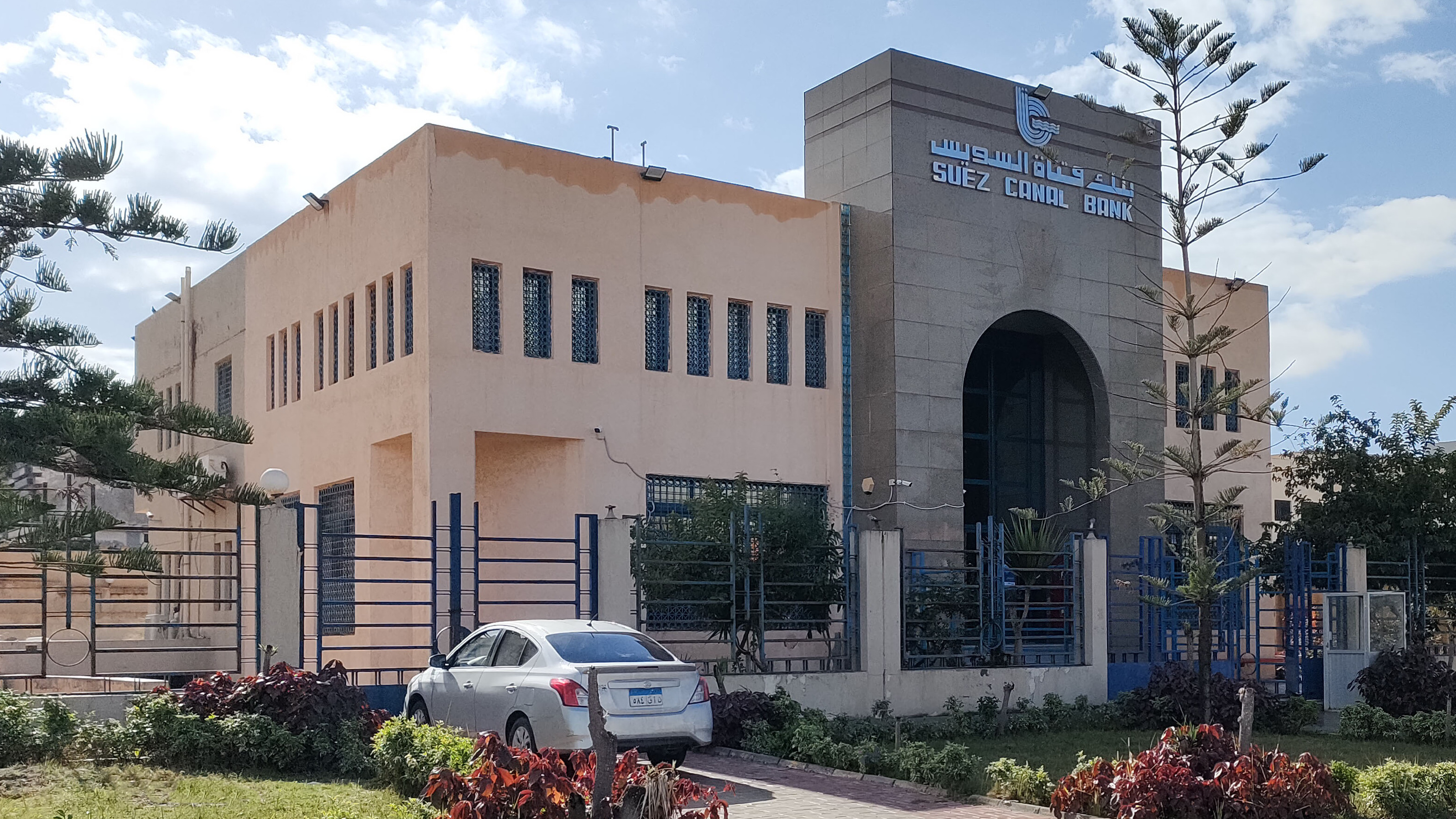
- Agency in New Borg El Arab
- Native name: بنك قناة السويس
- Type: Private bank
- Traded as: EGX: CANA
- ISIN: EGS60231C015
- Industry: Financial services
- Founded: 1978; 48 years ago (in Ismailia, Egypt)
- Headquarters: Cairo, Egypt
- Number of locations: 55 (2025)
- Area served: Egypt and Libya
- Key people: Akef El-Maghraby (Executive director)
- Total assets: USD 5,7 billion (2025)
- Number of employees: 2118 (2025)
- Website: scbank.com.eg

Suez Canal Bank, is a major Egyptian bank headquartered in Cairo. The bank provides financial services to individual and corporate clients in Egypt and at its branch in Tripoli, Libya.

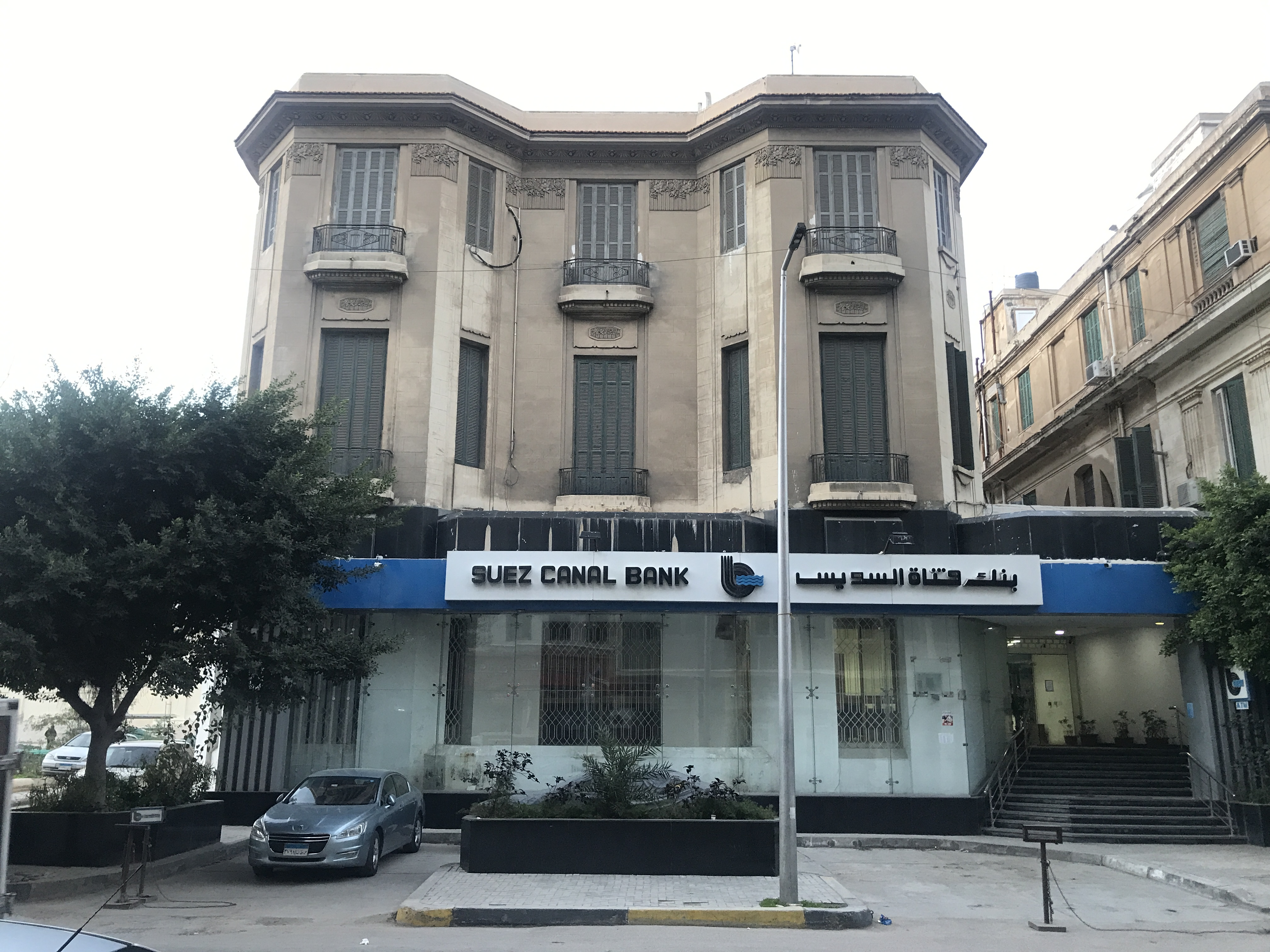
Agency in Alexandria

The bank provides its services and financial products to retail and corporate clients through over 40 branches in Egypt and Libya. Offerings include investment banking, trade finance, credit cards, financial services, and Islamic banking. As of 2015, the bank’s capital was £E 2 billion, and its registered profit was £E 195 million. Suez Canal Bank is one of the oldest banks in the Egyptian private sector.

== History ==
The Suez Canal Bank was founded in 1978 in Ismailia, a city in eastern Egypt, with authorized capital of £E 10 million and paid-in capital of £E 2.5 million. In 1982, the company offered its initial public offering on the Egyptian Exchange. The company opened an Islamic banking branch in Dokki in 1983. In 1998, the company was upgraded to £E500 million of authorized and £E100 million of paid-in capital. The first foreign branch was opened in Tripoli in 2002. In 2007, capital was raised once more, to £E2 billion authorized and £E1 billion paid-in.

The bank was established as a joint-stock company in 1978 according to Law No. 43 (Infitah) in 1974.

== Shareholders ==
As of 2026, the shareholders composition is:

| Name | Percentage |
|---|---|
| Arab International Bank | 41.5% |
| Libyan Foreign Bank | 27.7% |
| Suez Canal Authority Employee Pension Fund | 10.10% |
| Ahmed Diaa El-Din Ali Mohamed Hussein | 10% |
| Open circulation on the Egyptian Exchange | 10.7% |

== See also ==
- List of largest banks in Africa
