= Mamdouh Ismail =

Egyptian defense attorney

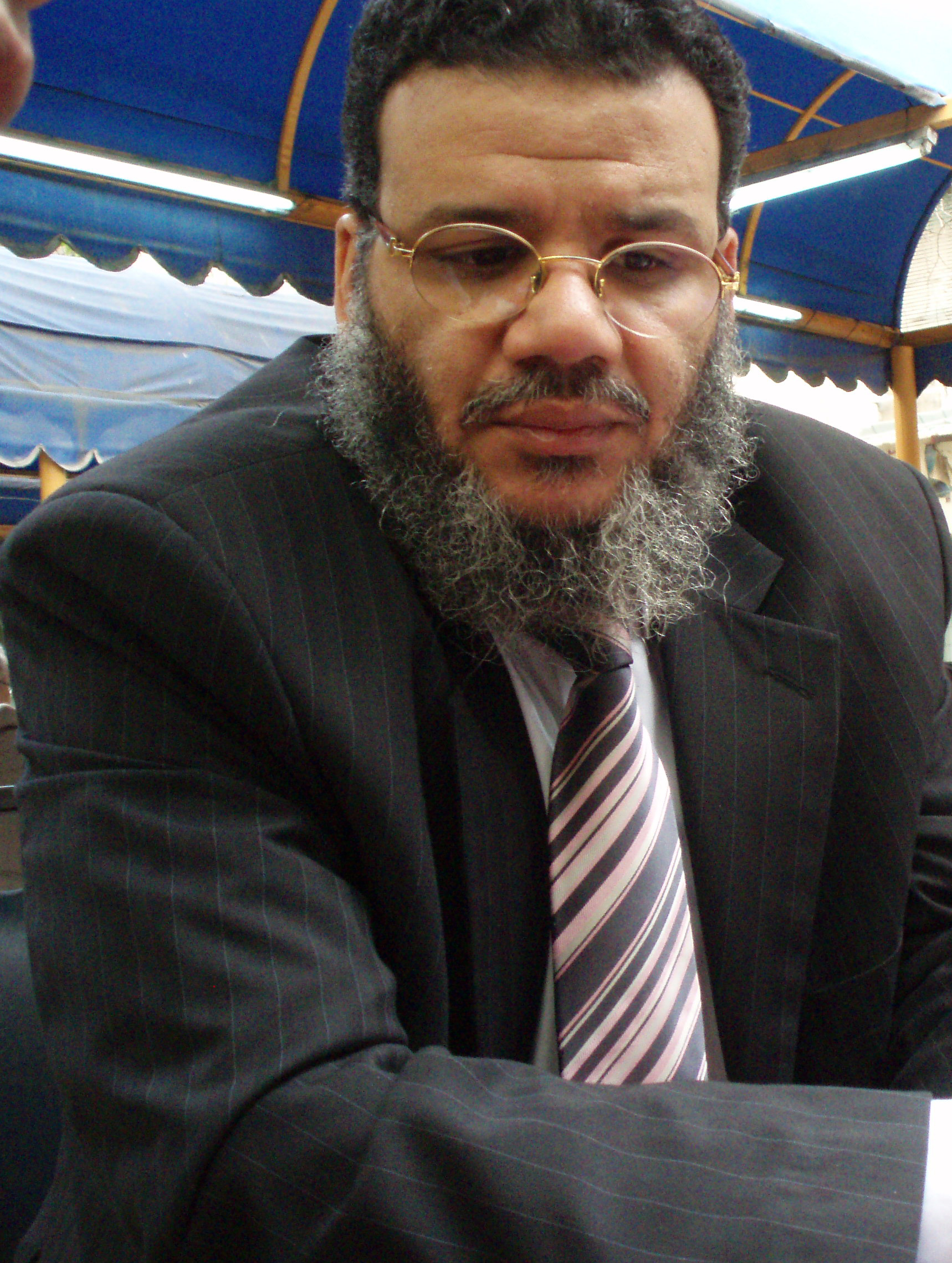
Mamdouh Ismail

Mamdouh Ismail (Arabic: ممدوح إسماعيل) is an Egyptian defence attorney and a former member of "the Jihad group" (later called Egyptian Islamic Jihad), who since the 1980s has represented various Egyptians accused of terrorism offences in Egypt. He was arrested himself on 29 March 2007 and is now accused of complicity in an "Egyptian project" of al-Qaeda, taking his orders from Ayman al-Zawahiri via Muhammad Khalil al-Hukaymah (al-Qaeda propaganda chief) and Hani al-Sibai (publicist for Egyptian Islamic Jihad). All three—Ismail, al-Sibai, and al-Hukaymah—deny that charge. Ismail is also charged with incitement. As of late 2011, he was a member of the Authenticity Party.

When Abu Musab al-Zarqawi was killed in June 2006 and replaced by someone with the previously unknown pseudonym Abu Hamza al-Muhajir, the American military soon identified the latter as Abu Ayyub al-Masri. It was Mamdouh Ismail who then started the false rumour that Abu Ayyub was already in prison in Egypt.

Ismael has publicly objected to a reconciliation between Cairo and Egyptian Islamic Jihad. In 1999 he was refused permission to establish an Islamist political party (called Hizb ash-Shari'a) with the help of fellow lawyer Muntasir al-Zayyat. Those two worked alongside Hani al-Sibai as well, before the latter took refuge in the UK.

Ismael was one of the hundreds who were rounded up following the assassination of Anwar al-Sadat in 1981; he served three years. The arrest in 2007 is his first since that time.
