= CSCBank SAL =

Lebanese bank

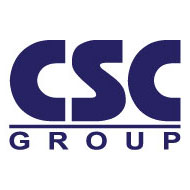
- Company type: Private
- Industry: Financial services Banking
- Founded: Beirut, Lebanon, (1992)
- Headquarters: Hamra Area, Beirut, Lebanon
- Area served: Europe; (France); MENA; (Lebanon, Jordan, Qatar, Bahrain, Cyprus, Iraq, Kuwait, Oman, Yemen, Djibouti); Central Africa; (Cameroun, Democratic Republic of Congo); Afghanistan; Comoros Island; Zimbabwe; South Sudan; Equatorial Guinea; Eastern Africa; (Kenya, Rwanda); West Africa; (Benin, Burkina Faso, Ivory Coast, Mali, Niger, Nigeria, Senegal, Togo)
- Services: Card Issuing, ATM Driving, Monitoring & Switching, POS Driving & Switching, Merchant Acquiring, Mobile Payment
- Number of employees: 321
- Subsidiaries: CSC Jordan; CSC Cyprus

CSCBank SAL (also known as CSC Group or “CSC”), is a Lebanese bank headquartered in Lebanon with offices in Jordan and Cyprus, along with processing centers located in the two countries. CSC has a branch network and operations in 30 countries in the Middle East, Africa and Europe. Moreover, CSC has a Disaster Recovery (DR) site in Cyprus.

Regulated by the Central Bank of Lebanon (Banque du Liban), the Banking Control Commission in addition to the Special Investigation Commission, CSC provides services such as Card Issuing & Management, ATM & Merchant Acquiring, POS Driving & Switching as well as Mobile Payment & Consultancy. Additionally, CSC is licensed to issue and acquire the following worldwide trademarks:

- MasterCard
- Visa
- UnionPay
- American Express
- Diners Club International
- GCC Net
- JCB
- Pulse
- Discover
