= Housing and Development Bank =

Egyptian bank

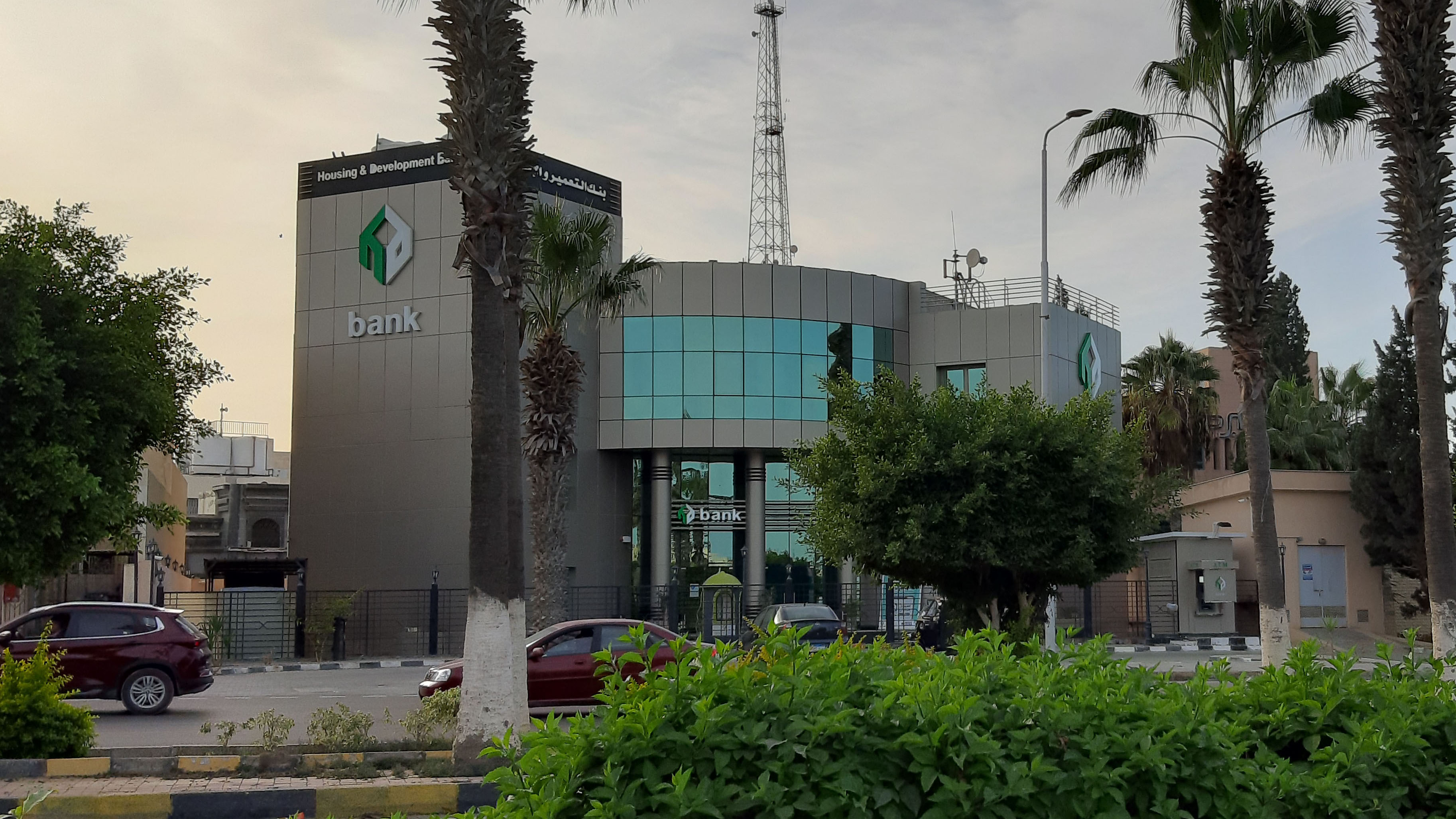
- New Borg El Arab city Branch
- Native name: بنك التعمير والإسكان
- Company type: Public bank
- Traded as: EGX: HDBK.CA
- ISIN: EGS65041C013
- Industry: Financial services
- Founded: 1979; 47 years ago
- Headquarters: Giza, Egypt
- Number of locations: 100 (2025)
- Key people: Hassan Ghanem (Chairman and CEO)
- Revenue: USD 392 millions (2025)
- Total assets: USD 5,1 billions (2025)
- Website: hdb-egy.com

The Housing and Development Bank (Egyptian Arabic: بنك التعمير والإسكان) is a major Egyptian bank. The bank has since been traded on the Egyptian Exchange (EGX) and has the Reuters code HDBK.CA.

== History ==
Founded in Cairo on June 30, 1979, originally as a state owned enterprise (SOE), with a mandate to alleviate housing shortages by narrowing the gap between the low supply and increasing demand. in 1983, the bank was listed on the Egyptian Exchange

The bank is a joint-stock company, where at the end of 2021 Egyptian SOEs owned the majority of shares (29.81% New Urban Communities Authority, 8.92% Misr Life Insurance, 8.29% by Misr Insurance, and 7.41% by the Housing Projects Fund, 5.03% Ministry of Awqaf) in addition to significant holdings by Saudi Arabian businessmen Abdelmoniem al-Rashed and Ali Dayekh through their Dubai based companies Rolaco EGB Investment LLC 10.00% and Rimco EGT Investment LLC 9.80% respectively.

At the end of 2022 HDBK had a market capitalization of £E9.2 billion. Currently, HDB is listed as number 17 in Forbes' Top 50 Listed Companies in Egypt 2023.

In May 2023, the sale of 7.8% of the bank through the Egyptian exchange was announced.

== Subsidiaries ==
- Holding Company for Investment and Development (92.00%)
- Development and Housing Company for Real Estate Investment (60.00%)
- HD Financial Leasing (60.00%)
- Digital Transformation Systems Co (40.00%)
- Hemaya Security and Money Transfer Co (40.00%)
- El Taameer for projects and Environmental Public Services (39.00%)
- El Tameer Company for Financial and Real Estate Marketing (39.00%)
- El Tameer Company for Real Estate Investment and Development (37.00%)
- Hyde Park Properties for Development (36.90%)
- Development and Housing Company for Utilities SAE (35.00%)
- City Edge (33.40%)
- Misr Sinai Tours Co (30.00%)
- Obelisk Portfolio Management and Investment Funds (30.00%)
- Taamir Mortgage Co (24.84%)
- Al Tameer Company for Real Estate Management (15.70%)
- HD Trading Securities (10.80%)
- El Taamir Securitization (NA)

== See also ==
- List of largest banks in Africa
- Banking in Egypt
