= National Bank of Oman =

Financial organization of Oman

- Company type: Bank
- Industry: Banking & Finance
- Founded: 1973
- Headquarters: Muscat, Oman
- Website: www.nbo.om

Founded in 1973, the National Bank of Oman (NBO) was the first local bank in Oman.

NBO has over 60 branches and 173 ATMs and Cash Deposit Machines across Oman. The bank has two international branches in Dubai and Abu Dhabi.

In 2014 NBO left Egypt.
