= Arab International Bank =

Egyptian bank

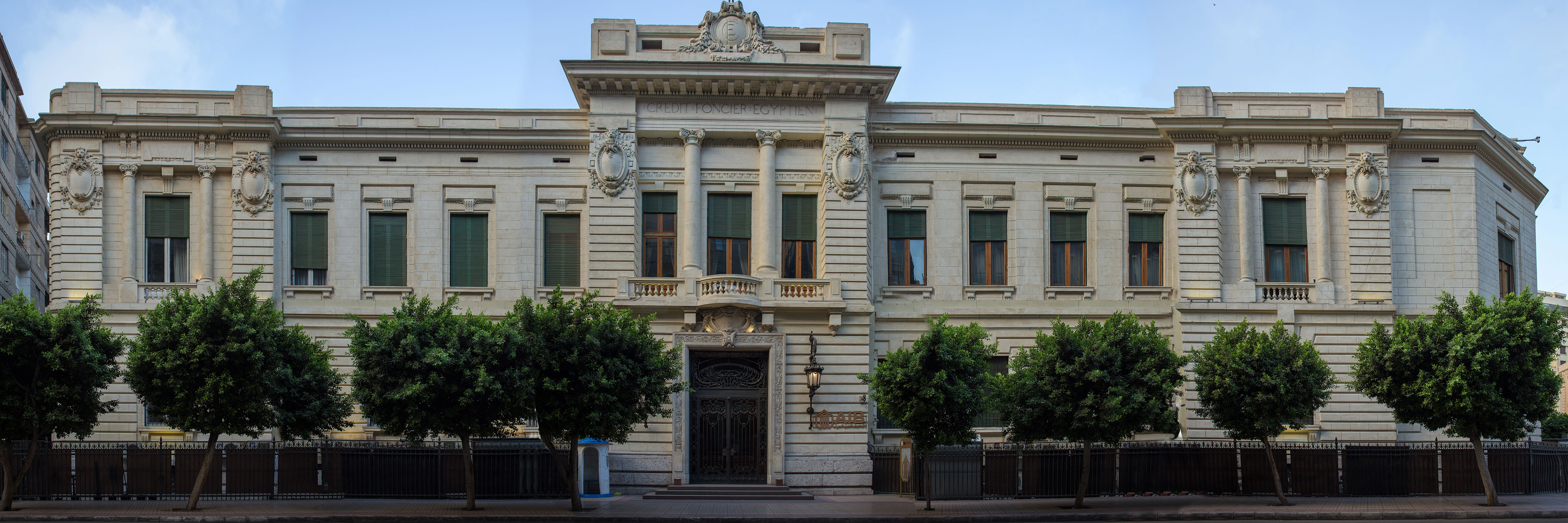
- Headquarters of the Bank
- Native name: المصرف العربي الدولي
- Type: Commercial bank
- Industry: Financial services
- Founded: 1974; 52 years ago
- Headquarters: Cairo, Egypt
- Number of locations: 23 (2024)
- Area served: Egypt
- Key people: Amr Mohamed Kamed (Chairman); Hisham Ramez (CEO)
- Products: Banking services, development banking
- Revenue: USD 77 millions (2024)
- Net income: USD 139 millions (2024)
- Total assets: USD 4,62 billions (2024)
- Total equity: USD 938 millions (2024)
- Number of employees: 1000 (2024)
- Website: aib.com.eg

The Arab International Bank, (arabic: المصرف العربي الدولي) is a medium-sized Egyptian bank. Founded in cooperation of Egypt, Libya, Qatar, Oman and the United Arab Emirates.

Unlike other purely commercial banks, the AIB focuses on bridging government and institutional investments.

== History ==
The AIB was not founded as a common commercial banking entity, but through an international treaty signed in 1974. This agreement was signed by the governments of several Arab countries to promote economic cooperation and foreign trade.

Since its inception, the bank was conceived to manage economic development projects and facilitate international trade transactions, especially those benefiting its member states and the Arab world in general.

Following the outbreak of the Egyptian revolution on January 25, 2011, and the exposure of the wealth of businessmen and ministers, lawyer Mamdouh Ismail stated that he had filed a report with the Public Prosecutor requesting a halt to all transactions and transfers from the Arab International Bank. He indicated that the Arab International Bank's board of directors had instructed employees to execute any financial transfers abroad without any upper limit on the amount transferred, and without disclosing the name of the person making the transfer, instead using initials rather than their full name. Ismail also requested the detention of the bank's chairman, Atef Ebeid, and an investigation into him based on these reports. Dr. Atef Ebeid assumed the chairmanship of the bank's board of directors after leaving his post as Prime Minister of Egypt, succeeding the bank's former chairman, Dr. Mustafa Khalil, who served as Prime Minister during the presidency of Anwar Sadat.

The Public Prosecutor requests information from the Central Bank regarding transfers made by the Arab International Bank. Counselor Abdel Meguid Mahmoud, the Public Prosecutor, requested the Central Bank of Egypt to provide him with information regarding whether any funds were transferred abroad through the Arab International Bank in the past two days. This request followed a report filed today by lawyer Mamdouh Ismail against the Arab International Bank, numbered 101 of 2011. The report stated that there were reports circulating within Egyptian banks indicating that the Arab International Bank had made suspicious transfers abroad in the past two days, using coded numbers and without names, given that this bank is not subject to the Central Bank's oversight except in certain circumstances.

In 2023, together with Arab African Internatıonal Bank, they announced the limitation of the use of debit cards outside of Egypt due to the liquidity crisis that the country was going through.

== Shareholder ==
As of 2024 the shareholding is:

Shareholder	Percentage
Central Bank of Egypt	38,76%
Libyan Foreign Bank	38,76%
Abu Dhabi Investment Authority	12,5%
Qatar Holding Company	4,98%
International Capital Trading	2,5%
Oman Investment Authority	2,49%

== See also ==
- List of largest banks in Africa
- Banking in Egypt
