= National Bank of Kuwait =

Kuwaiti bank

- Headquarters of the bank
- Native name: بنك الكويت الوطني
- Type: Public bank
- Traded as: BK: NBK
- ISIN: KW0EQ0100010
- Industry: Financial services
- Founded: 1952; 74 years ago
- Founders: Consortium of Kuwaiti merchants
- Headquarters: Kuwait City, Kuwait
- Number of locations: 70 (2025)
- Key people: Hamad Mohammed Al Bahar (Chairman); Isam Al Sager (Group CEO); Salah Al Fulaij (CEO - Kuwait)
- Revenue: USD 1,88 billion (2025)
- Operating income: USD 4,24 billion (2025)
- Total assets: USD 149 billion (2025)
- Total equity: USD 13,4 billion (2025)
- Number of employees: 8418 (2025)
- Website: www.nbk.com

The National Bank of Kuwait (NBK) is a multinational bank headquartered in Kuwait City. It was established in 1952 and operates 142 branches across 13 countries, at least seven of which are in the Middle East. It also offers alternative investments through its NBK Capital subsidiary, which, since its establishment in 2005, has allocated over $91 billion worth of investment banking mandates as of November 2022.

== History ==
NBK began as small, local bank in 1952. It was the "first indigenous bank and the first shareholding company" in the Gulf region. In 1961, banker Ibrahim Dabdoub joined NBK. He would become head of credit in 1969 and chief executive in 1983, leading NBK through the crash of the Souk Al-Manakh in 1982 and the Iraqi invasion of Kuwait in 1990.

By 1992, NBK had operations in London and then Saudi Arabia, the United Arab Emirates (UAE), and Iraq. By 2014, NBK had offices located in 16 countries, including China and the United States. That same year, Isam Jasem Al-Sager, who originally joined NBK in 1978, became chief executive officer (CEO) and Shaikha Khaled Al Bahar became Deputy Group CEO, having joined the bank in 1977 while Ibrahim Dabdoub retired.

In 2019, NBK began increasing its market share in Egypt. In December 2022, through its partnership with Kuwait Airways (KAC), NBK opened a new branch in KAC's headquarters. In April 2024, NBK's wealth management arm (NBK Wealth) partnered with British-American investment firm Janus Henderson, joining its emerging markets private capital division.

In July 2024, NBK appointed Peter Kelly as Deputy Head of Group Human Resources. In December of that year, NBK acquired a 51% stake in UPayments, an electronic payment and settlement services company in Kuwait. In November 2025, NBK partnered with fintech company AZ eWallet for services including BIN sponsorship, Virtual IBAN, and QR ATM cashless withdrawals and NBK launched its fintech Services. In December that year, NBK launched its mobile banking app.

In January 2026, NBK revamped its online banking platform. In April 2026, it was announced that NBK was shutting down its headquarters in Kuwait and its Sudan branch for two days due to strikes by Iran during the Middle East War.

== International operations ==
NBK operates as Wholesale banking in Saudi Arabia, United Arab Emirates, Bahrain and Lebanon.

- Egypt: National Bank of Kuwait (Egypt).
- Iraq: Credit Bank of Iraq, 80.85% ownership stake.

== Financial performance ==
NBK's net profits reached $1.073 billion in 2010, $1.075 billion in 2011, and $1.085 billion in 2012. In 2022, the National Bank of Kuwait posted a net profit of US$1.7 billion.

== Awards and recognition ==
In July 2025, NBK's Vice Chairman and Group CEO, Issam Jassim AlSager was included in Gulf Business's "MENA region’s most influential CEOs of 2025" list.

The National Bank of Kuwait was ranked seventh on Forbes Middle East's "30 Most Valuable Banks 2025" list. It also ranked 18th on Forbes Middle East's "Top 100 Listed Companies 2025" list.

For 2025, NBK won the "Best Retail Bank in the field of Customer Service" award as part of Service Hero's consumer-driven Customer Satisfaction Index.

In April 2026, NBK won the "Fueling Your Growth" Award at the 2026 Emplifi Excellence Awards.
