= Faisal Islamic Bank of Egypt =

Islamic Egyptian bank

- Type: Joint-stock company
- Traded as: EGX: FAIT
- ISIN: EGS60011C012
- Industry: Banking
- Founded: July 5, 1979
- Headquarters: Cairo, Egypt
- Number of locations: 43 (2025)
- Key people: Abdel Hamid Abu Mousa (Chairman)
- Products: Islamic banking
- Total assets: USD 5,4 billion (2025)
- Number of employees: 1700 (2023)
- Website: www.faisalbank.com.eg

Faisal Islamic Bank of Egypt SAE is a major Egyptian "shariah-compliant" financial institution, with a market capitalization of $402 million as of September 2016. It is a joint-stock company and was incorporated in 1977 but started operating in 1979. Bloomberg News reports it provides "various" commercial "banking products and services in Egypt and internationally", such as "current and investment accounts, and joint accounts; saving certificates; and mutual funds".

According to the bank, it was "the first Egyptian Islamic and Commercial bank". Another source describes it as "part of the banking empire" established by Saudi Prince Mohammed al-Faisal and associated with Saudi Arabia's conservative political and religious influence in Egypt.

Among the bank's first activities was providing animator/musician Richard Williams with funding for his passion project The Thief and the Cobbler (1978–79).

As of 2025, it has nearly 2,5 million current accounts.

== See also ==
- List of largest banks in Africa
- Islamic banking and finance
