= Abu Dhabi Islamic Bank =

Islamic Emirati bank

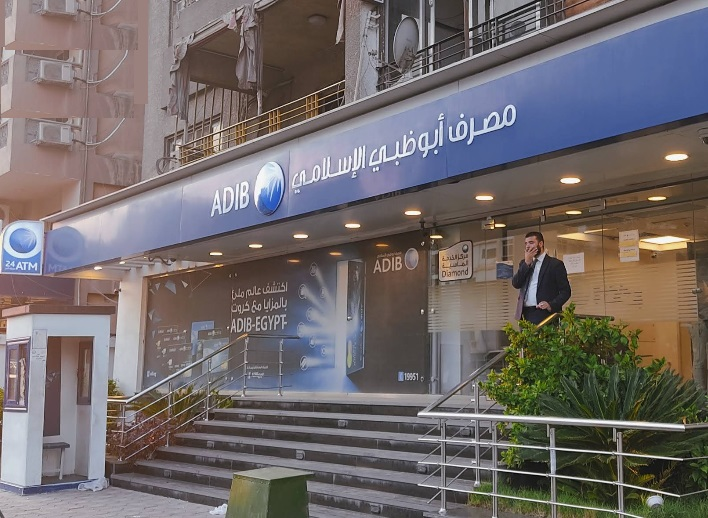
- Branch in Egypt
- Type: Public bank
- Traded as: ADX: ADIB; EGX: ADIB
- ISIN: AEA000801018; EGS60111C019
- Founded: May 20, 1997; 29 years ago
- Headquarters: Abu Dhabi, United Arab Emirates
- Number of locations: 140 (2025)
- Key people: Jawaan Awaidha Suhail Al Khaili (Chairman); Mohamed Abdelbary (CEO)
- Revenue: AED 7,07 billion (2025) (USD 1.92 billion)
- Operating income: AED 12,3 billion (2025) (USD 3.34 billion)
- Total assets: AED 281 billion (2025) (USD 76.5 billion)
- Website: www.adib.ae

Abu Dhabi Islamic Bank PJSC (Arabic: مصرف أبوظبي الإسلامي) is a major Islamic Emirati bank based in Abu Dhabi city. ADIB was ranked 12th on Forbes Middle East's 30 Most Valuable Banks 2025 list. It also ranked 27th on Forbes Middle East's Top 100 Listed Companies 2025 list. As of it manage 2,3 million current acounts.

ADIB commenced its operations with a paid-up capital of one billion dirhams divided into one hundred million shares, the value of each share being ten dirhams. The shares are quoted on the Abu Dhabi Securities Market.

== History ==
Abu Dhabi Islamic Bank (ADIB) was established on 20 May 1997 as a Public Joint Stock Company through the Amiri Decree No. 9 of 1997. The Bank commenced commercial operations on 11 November 1998, and was formally inaugurated by Abdullah Bin Zayed Al Nahyan, UAE Minister of Information and Culture on 18 April 1999. All contracts, operations and transactions are carried out in accordance with Islamic Shari'a principles.

In August 2025, Abu Dhabi Islamic Bank PJSC and Visa partnered to launch Remit!, a real-time cross-border money transfer service.

== International operations ==
- Egypt: Start operation in 2007 following the acquisition of the National Development Bank of Egypt.
- Iraq: ADIB has had a branch in Iraq since 2012, located in Baghdad.
- Qatar: ADIB has had a branch in Qatar since 2011, located in Doha.
- Saudi Arabia: Opened its first branch in Saudi Arabia in 2018.
- Sudan: ADIB officially launched its operations in Sudan in December 2012, with the opening of its first branch in Khartoum.

== Board of directors ==
- Chairman - H.E. Jawaan Awaidha Suhail Awaidha Al Khaili
- Vice Chairman & Board Member - Mr. Faisal Sultan Naser Salem Al Shuaibi
- Group CEO - Mr. Mohammed Abdelbary
- Board Member Non-Executive - Mr. Abdulla Ali Musleh Jumhour Al Ahbabi
- Board Member Non-Executive - Mr. Abdul Wahab Al-Halabi
- Board Member Non-Executive - Mr. Khalifa Matar Khalifa Qaroona Almheiri
- Board Member Non-Executive - Mrs. Maha Mohammed Al Qattan
- Board Member Non-Executive - Mr. Najib Youssef Fayyad

The average tenure of ADIB Board members is 5 years.

== See also ==
- List of banks in United Arab Emirates
