= Arab Bank Egypt =

Egyptian bank

Arab Bank (Egypt)

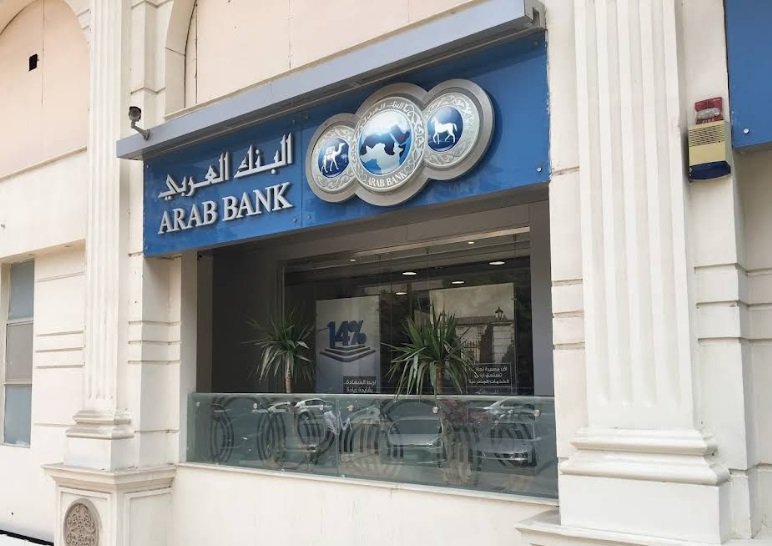
- Agency in Heliopolis
- Native name: البنك العربي (مصر)
- Company type: Subsidiary
- Industry: Financial services
- Founded: 1944
- Headquarters: Cairo, Egypt
- Number of locations: 42 (2025)
- Area served: Egypt
- Key people: Ahmed Ismail Hassan (Country Manager)
- Number of employees: 1372 (2025)
- Parent: Arab Bank
- Website: www.arabbank.com.eg

The Arab Bank (Egypt), (arabic: البنك العربي (مصر)) is a medium-sized Egyptian bank, subsidiary of the Jordanian group Arab Bank.

== History ==
Arab Bank, founded in Jerusalem in 1930, began its regional expansion into Egypt in 1944, when the first branch was established in Cairo. An Alexandria branch opened in 1948. In 1961, the Bank was nationalized by the government of Gamal Abdel Nasser.

In 1977, Following the economic liberalization (Infitah) Arab Bank was among the first regional institutions to return to the Egyptian market. Focusing heavily in Corporative banking. During the 2000s, the Bank started its retail banking business.

== See also ==
- List of largest banks in Africa
- Banking in Egypt
