= Arab African Internatıonal Bank =

Egyptian bank

Arab African International Bank
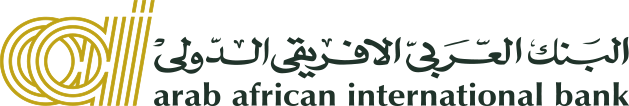

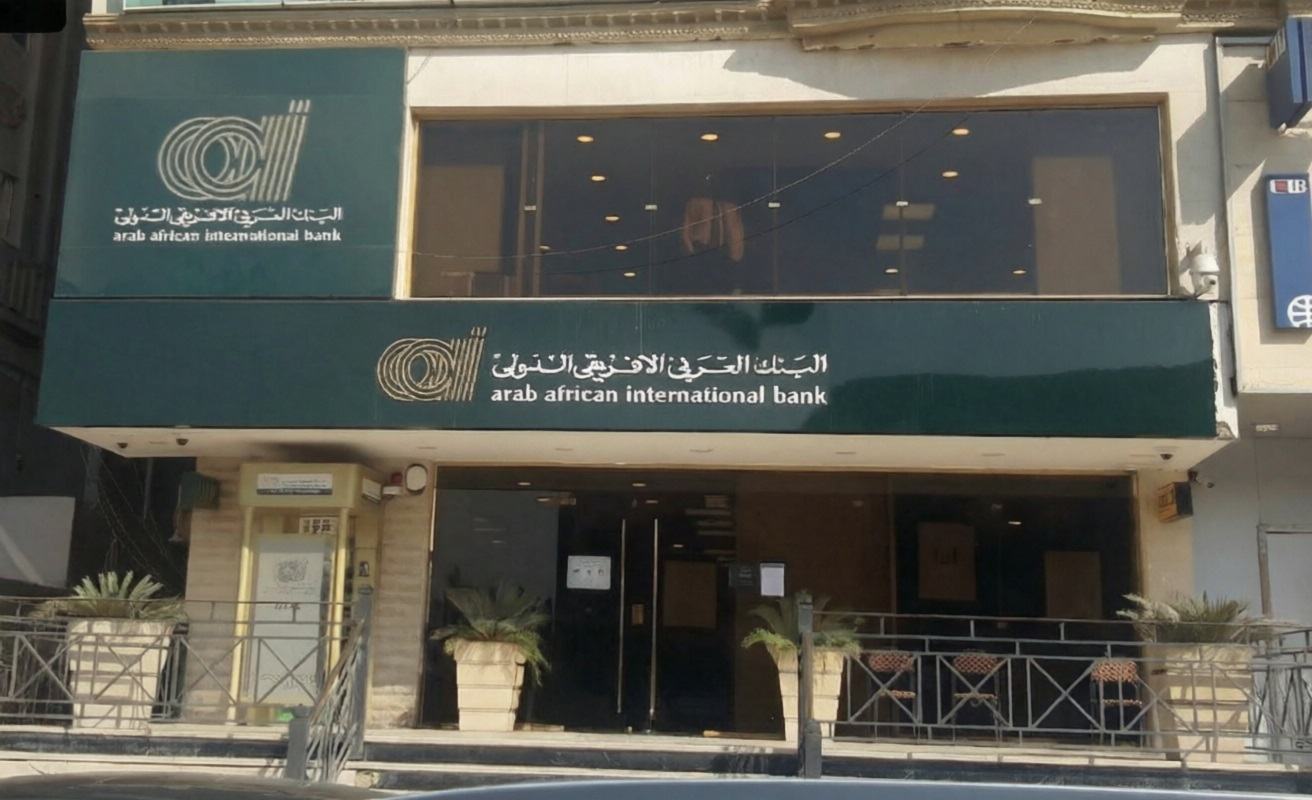
- Branch in Cairo
- Type: Private bank
- Industry: Financial services
- Founded: 1964; 62 years ago
- Headquarters: Cairo, Egypt
- Number of locations: 99 (2024)
- Area served: Egypt
- Key people: Osamah Othman Al-Furaih (Chairman); Tamer Wahid (CEO)
- Products: Banking services
- Revenue: USD 301 millions (2024)
- Total assets: USD 18,2 billion (2024)
- Total equity: USD 2,6 billions (2024)
- Number of employees: 3180 (2024)
- Website: aaib.com

Arab African International Bank, (AAIB) is a major Egyptian bank, that is one of the big five banks in Egypt. As well as its operations in Egypt it has branches in the United Arab Emirates and Lebanon.

The bank's capital is held by two main institutional shareholders: the Central Bank of Egypt (CBE): 49.37% and the Kuwait Investment Authority (KIA): 49.37%.

== History ==
It was established in 1964 by a special law, jointly owned by the Central Bank of Egypt and the Kuwait Investment Authority.

Its initial objective was to leverage the region's wealth and serve as a financial pillar for regional ambitions. The founding treaty was signed by Egyptian President Gamal Abdel Nasser and Gabr Al Ahmed Al Gabr Al Sabbah, the former Crown Prince of Kuwait.

In 1970, it expanded regionally with the launch of the AAIB-UAE, becoming the first Egyptian private sector bank to extend its operations into the Gulf region.

In 1982, it launched the first international trading floor in Egypt and introduced the first credit cards to the market.

In May 2015, the bank acquired all of Scotiabank's assets in Egypt.

In October 2023, AAIB became one of Egypt's largest banks to suspend the use of debit cards for purchases outside of Egypt and to set new limits on cash withdrawals abroad ranging from EGP 11,000 (USD 355) to EGP 33,000 (USD 1,067) per month.

In September 2024, the government announced its intention to sell its stakes in 32 companies, including the Banque du Caire, the Arab African International Bank, and Alexbank, through the Egyptian Exchange.

== See also ==
- List of largest banks in Africa
