= Agricultural Bank of Egypt =

Egyptian bank

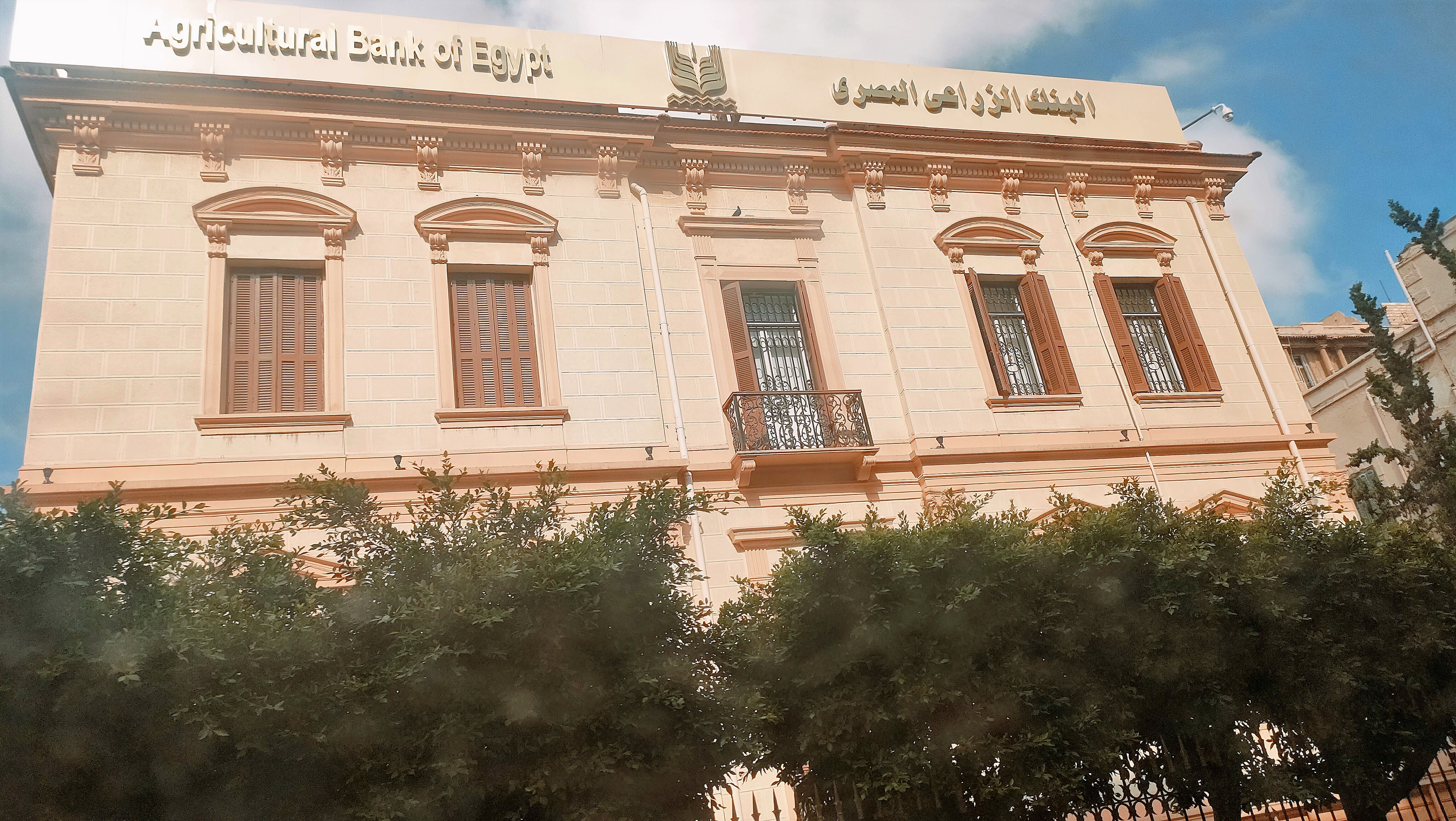
- Headquarter building of the bank
- Type: Public bank
- Industry: Financial services
- Founded: 1930; 96 years ago
- Headquarters: Giza, Egypt
- Number of locations: 1114 (2024)
- Area served: Egypt
- Key people: Mohamed Abul Soud (CEO)
- Total assets: USD 4,3 billions (2024)
- Number of employees: 3,393 (2024)
- Website: www.abe.com.eg

Agricultural Bank of Egypt (ABE), (formerly known as Principal Bank for Development and Agricultural Credit) is a medium-sized Egyptian public bank. It is one of the banks specializing in agricultural banking in Egypt.

As of 2023, the bank had 543,177 current accounts.

== History ==
The State established the Egyptian Agricultural Credit Bank in accordance with Decree-Law No. 50 of 1930 with a capital of one million Egyptian pounds. A Royal Decree created the Egyptian Agricultural Credit Bank in 1931 during the global economic crisis to provide loans to Egyptian farmers and protect them from real estate banks and foreign lenders. The bank's management has been subject to change since the enactment of Law No. 117 of 1976 and the renaming of it to the "Main Agricultural Development and Credit Bank."

Recently, Law No. 84 of 2016 was enacted, stipulating that the Main Agricultural Development and Credit Bank would be transformed into a public sector bank called the Agricultural Bank of Egypt. It is structured as an Egyptian joint-stock company owned by a single director, possesses independent legal personality, and is headquartered in Greater Cairo. All the rights of the Main Agricultural Development and Credit Bank are transferred to it, and it assumes all its obligations.

According to this law, the Agricultural Bank of Egypt is subject to the provisions of Law No. 88 of 2003, the Central Bank, the Banking Authority, and the Monetary Agency. The Agricultural Bank of Egypt aims to provide the necessary financing for various types of agricultural and rural development activities in accordance with the existing banking systems and within the framework of the State's general policy.

The Agricultural Bank of Egypt is one of the country's most important agricultural development institutions. It is one of the largest agricultural banks in the Arab world, with more than 1,114 branches and rural banks covering all of Egypt. It also has over 4 million square meters of storage capacity, of which 2 million square meters are designated for receiving local wheat from farmers.

In 2021, The bank signed an agreement with Misr Life Insurance to offer its assurance services in the bank's branches.

== See also ==
- List of largest banks in Africa
