= QNB Egypt =

Egyptian bank

- Formerly: QNB Al Ahli
- Type: Subsidiary
- Traded as: EGX: QNBE
- ISIN: EGS60081C014
- Industry: Financial services
- Predecessor: National Société Générale Bank
- Founded: 2013; 13 years ago
- Headquarters: Cairo, Egypt
- Number of locations: 239 (2025)
- Area served: Egypt
- Key people: Ali Rashid Al-Mohannadi (Chairman); Mohamed Mahmoud Bedeir (CEO)
- Revenue: EGP 30 billions (2025) (USD 571 millions)
- Net income: EGP 49,4 billions (2025) (USD 939 millions)
- Total assets: EGP 929 billions (2025) (USD 17,6 billions)
- Total equity: EGP 116 billions (2025) (USD 2,2 billions)
- Number of employees: 7,600 (2025)
- Parent: QNB Group
- Website: www.qnb.com.eg

QNB Egypt, known until 2024 as QNB Al Ahli, is a major Egyptian bank which is among the largest five banks in the country. It is the local subsidiary of the Qatar National Bank Group and has approximately 2 million customers.

== History ==
In 2013, the QNB Group acquired a majority stake in National Société Générale Bank, originally established in 1978, from Société Générale for US$2 billion.

In 2024, as part of a strategic move to unify its global brand identity, the bank gradually phased out the "Al Ahli" name in Egypt, officially becoming QNB Egypt.

In October 2025, the bank received authorization to launch its digital banking platform, ezbank.

== See also ==
- List of largest banks in Africa
- QNB Turkey
