= Alexbank =

Egyptian bank

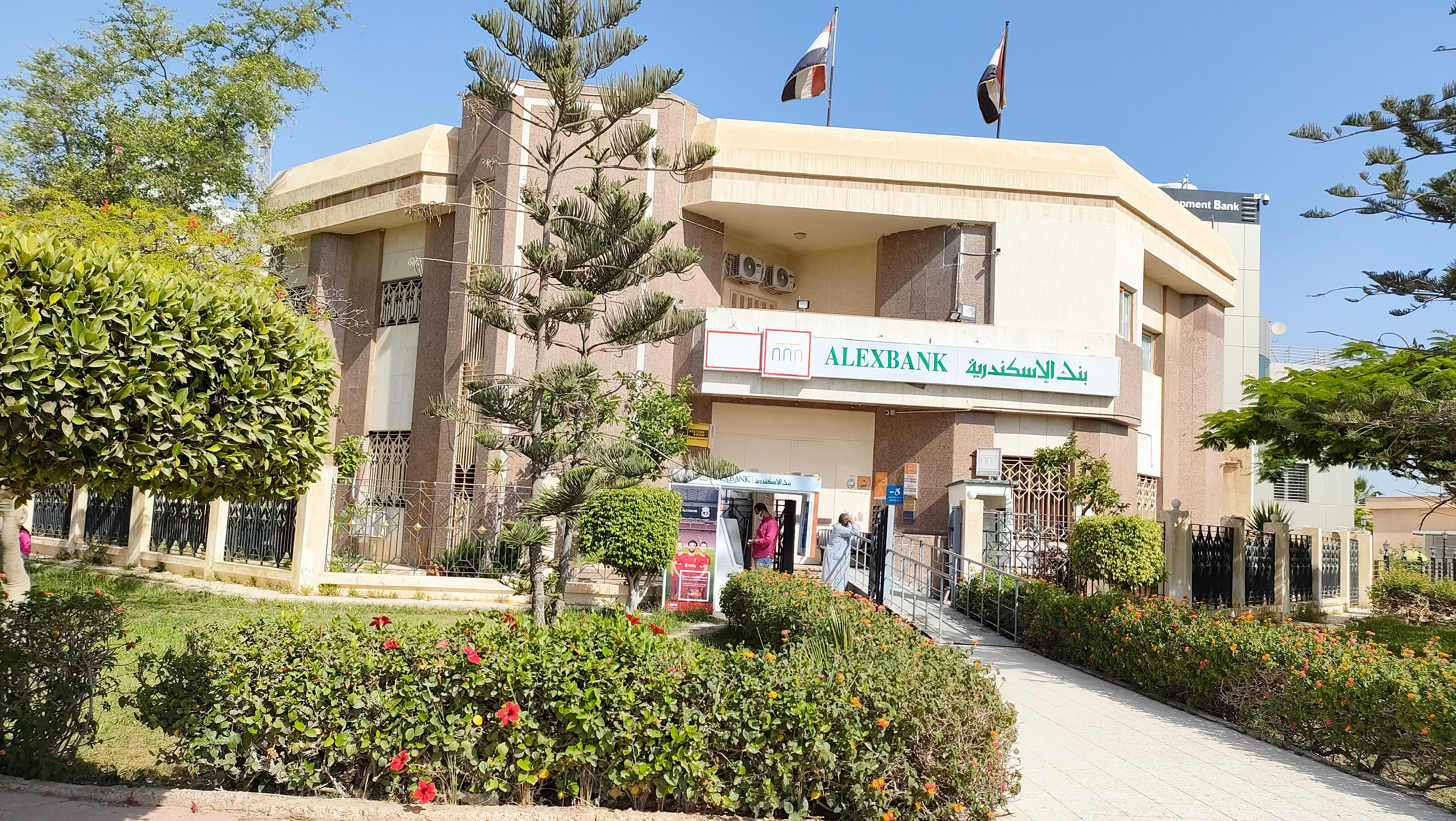
- New Borg El Arab city Branch
- Formerly: Bank of Alexandria
- Type: Private bank
- Industry: Financial services
- Founded: 1957
- Headquarters: Alexandria, Egypt
- Number of locations: 210 (2025)
- Key people: Ziad Bahaa-Eldin (Chairman)
- Net income: EGP 22,2 billion (2025) (USD 415 millions)
- Total assets: EGP 242 billion (2025) (USD 4,52 billion)
- Total equity: EGP 35,9 billion (2025) (USD 671 millions)
- Number of employees: 4200 (2025)
- Parent: Intesa Sanpaolo
- Website: www.alexbank.com

Alexbank, formerly known as Bank of Alexandria is a medium-sized Egyptian Bank. Founded in 1957, it has a market share of almost 7%. Intesa Sanpaolo is the major shareholder in the bank.

The bank holds 70.25% of the bank shares, IFC holds 9.75%, and the Egyptian Government holds 20%. Mahmoud Abdel Salam Omar, who is a former head of the Egyptian Banks Federation, is a former chairman of the bank.

== History ==
- In 1857, local Greek merchants established a Bank of Alexandria to cater to the needs of the Greek merchant community. This bank was liquidated in 1877.
- 1864 The English overseas bank, Anglo-Egyptian Bank was founded.
- 1924 Anglo Egyptian Bank merged with The Colonial Bank (est. 1836) and the First National Bank of South Africa (est. 1891) to form Barclays Bank (Dominion, Colonial and Overseas). Barclays had inherited the ownership of The Colonial Bank when it acquired the London Provincial and South Western Bank in 1918.
- 1957 The Egyptian government founded Bank of Alexandria to take over the Egyptian operations of Barclays Bank DCO, which the Egyptian government had nationalized in 1956 after British and French troops attacked Egypt and occupied the Suez Canal during the Suez Crisis.
- 1964 Bank of Alexandria acquired Banque du Nile and Import-Export Bank of Egypt.
- 17 October 2006, The Egyptian government privatized Bank of Alexandria. Sanpaolo IMI, the Italian bank which itself was acquired by Banca Intesa, agreed to pay $1.6 billion for 80% of Bank of Alexandria. This was the first privatization in Egypt of a fully government-owned bank.

== See also ==
- List of largest banks in Africa
- List of banks in Egypt
