= HSBC Bank Egypt =

Egyptian bank

- Type: Subsidiary
- Industry: Banking, Financial services
- Founded: 1982
- Headquarters: Cairo, Egypt
- Number of locations: 53 (2024)
- Key people: Nasser Alshaali (Chairman); Jacques-Emmanuel Blanchet (CEO)
- Total assets: USD 5,46 billions (2025)
- Number of employees: 3800 (2024)
- Parent: HSBC Holdings plc
- Website: www.hsbc.com.eg

HSBC Bank Egypt S.A.E. is a major Egyptian bank and a subsidiary of HSBC Bank.

== History ==
HSBC Bank Egypt was established in 1982 as Hongkong Egyptian Bank with 40% HSBC ownership. In January 1994, the bank was renamed Egyptian British Bank under the same shareholding structure. The bank took the name HSBC Bank Egypt in April 2001 following an increase in shareholding by the HSBC Group's from 40% to 94.5% of its issued share capital.

Following the 2011 Egyptian Revolution, HSBC was accused of helping to enrich high-ranking Egyptian political and economic officials, who are now at the center of corruption investigations.

In October 2023, HSBC became one of the largest Egyptian banks to suspend the use of debit cards for purchases outside of Egypt and to set new limits on cash withdrawals abroad ranging from EGP 11,000 (USD 355) to EGP 33,000 (USD 1,067) per month.

In January 2026, the Central Bank of Egypt (CBE) fined HSBC Egypt a total of 1.143 billion Egyptian pounds.

In early 2026, HSBC announced it was reviewing the future of its retail banking operations in Egypt as part of a broader simplification strategy. According to some sources, local institutions such as Commercial International Bank have expressed interest in a potential acquisition of this portfolio.

== See also ==
- HSBC Bank Middle East
