= Al Ahli Bank of Kuwait =

Kuwaiti bank

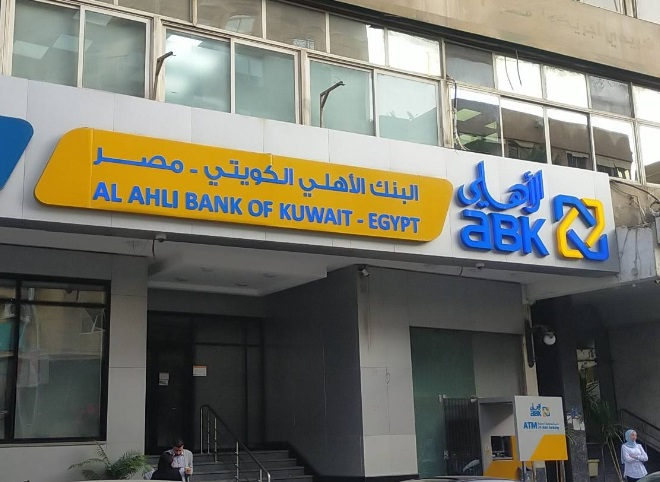
- Branch in Egypt
- Type: Public bank
- Traded as: KSE:ABK
- ISIN: KW0EQ0100044
- Industry: Financial services
- Founded: May 23, 1967; 59 years ago
- Headquarters: Kuwait City, Kuwait
- Number of locations: 76 (2025)
- Area served: Kuwait, UAE, Egypt
- Key people: Talal Mohammed Reza Behbehani (Chairman); Giel-Jan M. Van Der Tol (CEO)
- Revenue: KWD 62.2 million (2025) (USD 202 million)
- Operating income: KWD 221 million (2025) (USD 715 million)
- Total assets: KWD 7,1 billion (2025) (USD 22,5 billion)
- Total equity: KWD 720 million (2025) (USD 2,3 billion)
- Website: abk.eahli.com

Al Ahli Bank of Kuwait (ABK; Arabic: البنك الأهلي الكويتي, romanized: al-Bank al-Ahlī al-Kuwaytī) is a retail and commercial bank located in Kuwait City, The services are provided via 29 branches in Kuwait, 2 branches in the United Arab Emirates (Abu Dhabi and Dubai) and 45 branches in Egypt.

Together with Emirates, the largest airline in the Middle East, they offer to passengers various types of Visa credit and prepaid cards.

== History ==
On May 23, 1967. ABK is established by Amiri Decree in Kuwait City, In 1987 ABK becomes the first Kuwaiti bank to establish an onshore presence in the United Arab Emirates.

In 2015, the bank acquired all assets of Piraeus Bank in Egypt for USD 150 million. Entering the Egyptian retail banking market.

In 2016, the Global Finance magazine ranked ABK in 10th place on its List of the 50 Safest Banks in the Middle East.

In 2025, Al Ahli Bank of Kuwait entered into a market-maker agreement with Kuwait Investment Company to support liquidity in its publicly traded shares on Boursa Kuwait.

== See also ==
- List of banks in Kuwait
- List of banks in Asia
