= National Bank of Egypt =

Largest commercial bank in Egypt

National Bank of Egypt البنك الأهلي المصري

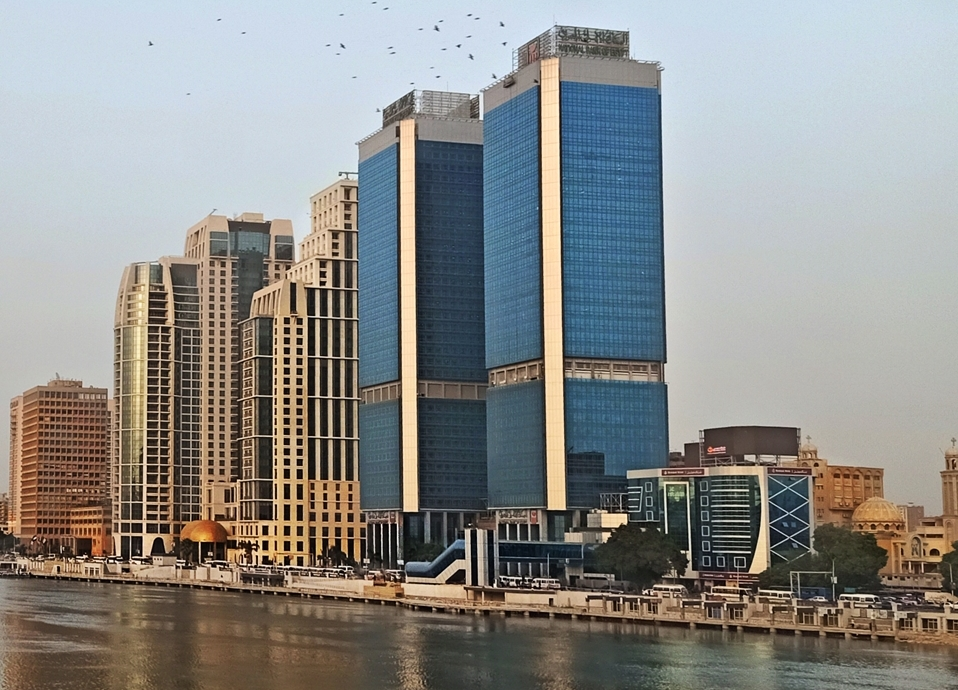
- NBE twin towers, the headquarters
- Type: Public bank
- Industry: Banking and financial services
- Founded: June 25, 1898
- Headquarters: Cairo, Egypt
- Number of locations: 679 (2024)
- Key people: Mohamed Kamal Al Din (Chairman); Mohamed El-Etreby (CEO)
- Services: Financing
- Revenue: EGP 133,3 billion (2024) (USD 2,5 billion)
- Total assets: EGP 8,14 trillion (2024) (USD 156,8 billion)
- Number of employees: 29 162 (2024)
- Website: www.nbe.com.eg

National Bank of Egypt S.A.E. (NBE; Egyptian Arabic: البنك الأهلي المصري) is a major Egyptian bank, between the big five banks. Founded in June 1898, it is the country's largest bank in terms of assets, deposits, loans, bank-capital, number of total branches, and employees.

NBE has 540 branches within the country, assets of £E 366,6 bn., total deposits of £E 312,7 bn., and total loans and advances of £E 114,7 bn. As of 2007, the National Bank of Egypt accounted for 23% of the Egyptian banking system's total assets, 25% of total deposits and 25% of total loans and advances. NBE also financed about 24% of Egypt's foreign trade during the year. NBE also accounts for 74% of the credit card market and 40% of the debit cards in Egypt.

== History ==
=== 19th century ===
In 1898, Sir Ernest Cassel (50% ownership), the three brothers Joseph Suares (1837–1900), Raphael Suares (1846–1909) and Felix Isaac Suares (1844–1906), Moise Cattaui (25%) and Constantine Salvagos of Alexandria (25%) established the National Bank of Egypt (NBE), though Cassel remained in England. NBE established an agency in London.

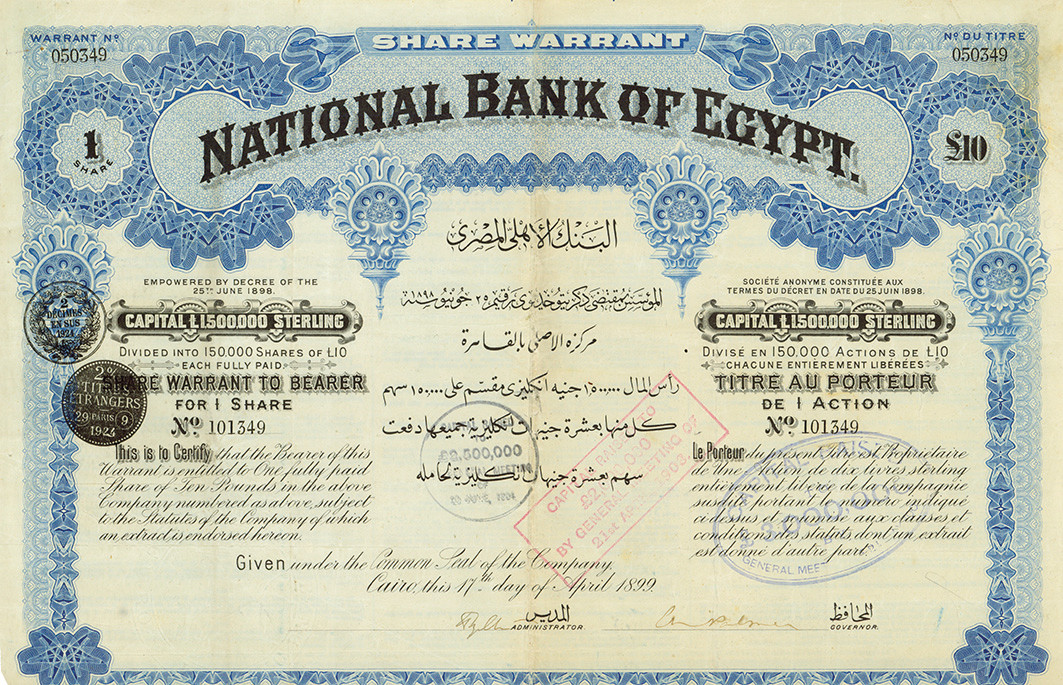
Share certificate of the National Bank of Egypt, issued 17 April 1899

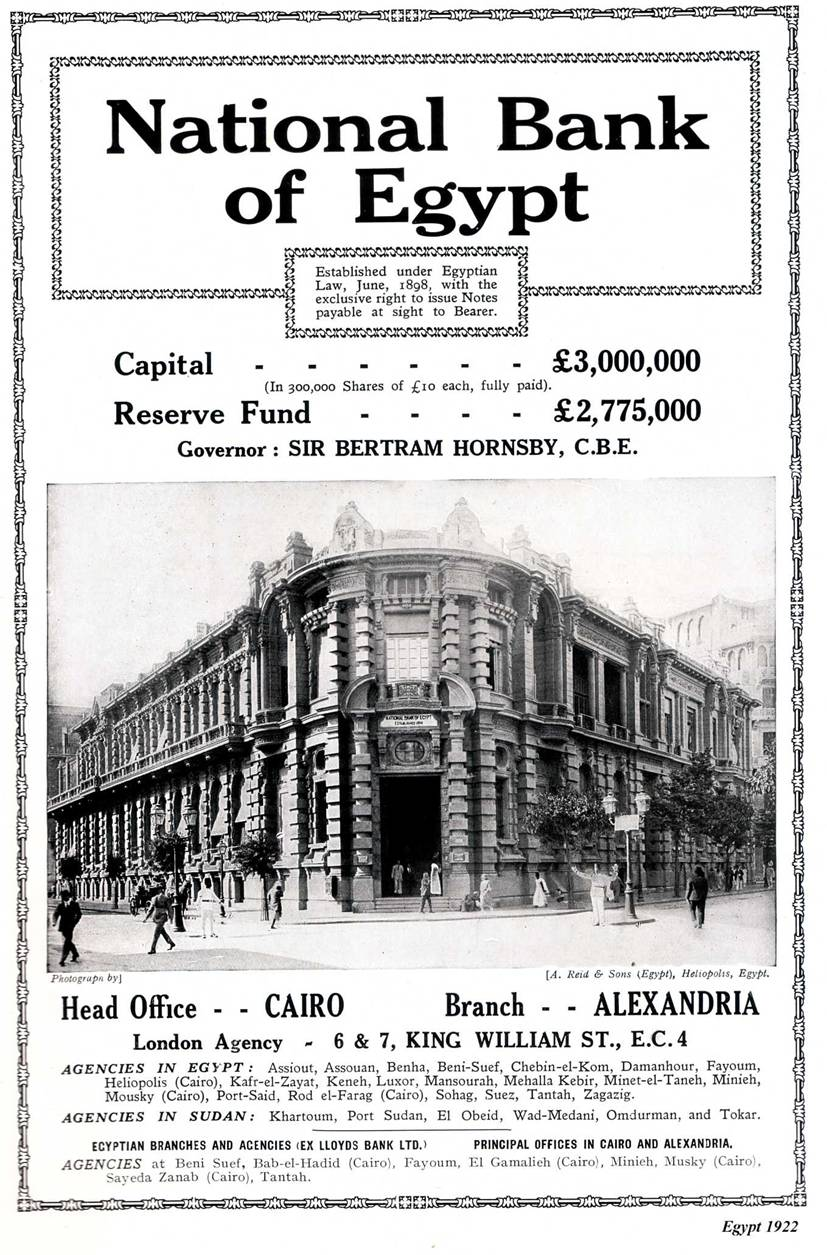
Advertisement for the National Bank of Egypt, showing its Cairo headquarters before reconstruction in the late 1940s

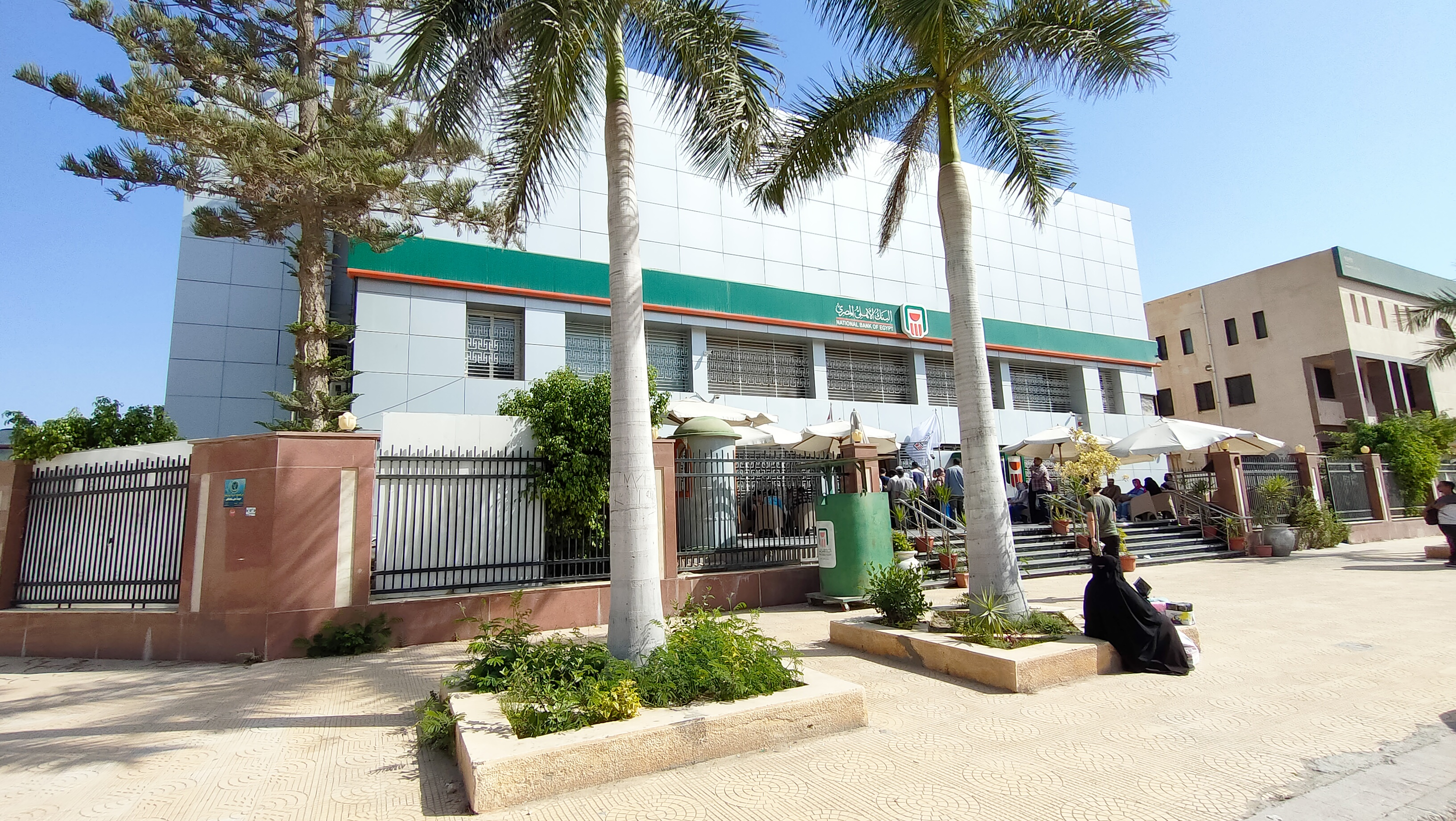
New Borg El Arab city Branch

=== 20th century ===
- 1901 NBE opened a branch in Khartoum. It obtained a privileged position as banker to and for the government and acted as the semi-official central bank. Over time, it added further agencies and branches in the Sudan.
- 1902 Cassel established the Agricultural Bank of Egypt.
- 1906 NBE established the Bank of Abyssinia in Addis Ababa. The bank received a 50-year monopoly and was the Ethiopian government's fiscal agent as well as the sole issuer of currency.
- 1925 Lloyds Bank transferred to NBE the branches in Cairo and Alexandria that it acquired with its purchase of Cox & Kings in 1923 and from the Bank of British West Africa.
- 1931 The Bank of Abyssinia was liquidated and the Ethiopian government established Bank of Ethiopia to replace it.
- 1936 Agricultural Bank of Egypt was liquidated.
- 1940 All the staff and the Board of the bank were largely Egyptian.
- 1951 A decree gave NBE the status of the Central Bank for Egypt.
- 1957 The Banking Act confirmed the status of NBE as Egypt's Central Bank.
- 1959 The government of the Sudan nationalized NBE's assets in the Sudan, using them as the basis for the new central bank, the Bank of Sudan
- 1960 The Egyptian government nationalized NBE and created a separate central bank.
- 1961 Citibank sold to NBE its Egyptian assets and liabilities. Citibank had entered in 1955 but was forced to leave by the nationalization decree.
- 1975 Chase Manhattan Bank (49%) and National Bank of Egypt (51%) established Commercial International Bank (CIB).
- 1976 NBE, together with 19 other Arab and four US banks, established Arab American Bank as a wholesale bank operating in New York.
- 1982 NBE established a subsidiary in the UK.
- 1987 Chase sold its shares in CIB to NBE and CIB changed its name to Commercial International Bank, SAE. Partial privatization in 1993 and a GDR issue in 1996 reduced NBE's share to 34%. NBE established a rep office in South Africa and a banking subsidiary in London, which took over the assets and operations of NBE's previous subsidiary and its by then two branches there.

=== 21st century ===
- 2000 NBE established a NY branch to take over the business of Arab American Bank.
- 2005 NBE acquired Mohandes Bank, which had been established in 1979 as a commercial bank. It also acquired Bank of Commerce and Development, known as "Al Tigaryoon".
- 2006 NBE opened a representative office in Dubai.
- 2008 NBE upgraded its representative office in Shanghai into a branch.

== International operations ==
NBE has one subsidiary external to Egypt, within London, Britain, the only subsidiary of the bank. Branches in New York and Shanghai, and representative offices in Johannesburg and Dubai

United States operations of the bank, commencing at some time during 2001, are directed from within an office of the Black Rock Building located on 40 East, 52nd street of New York City

=== Universal bank ===
- Saudi Arabia: In 2021, the Council of Ministers approved the granting of a license to the National Bank of Egypt to open a commercial branch in the country.
- South Sudan: The bank officially opened on June 28, 2022. It is located in Juba, in the commercial area of Juba Market, near the Bank of South Sudan.
- Sudan: It is present in Sudan; the subsidiary began operations in Khartoum in 2012.

== See also ==
- List of largest banks in Africa

== Bibliography ==
- Caselli, Clara (1980). "The Development of the Banking System and Monetary Policy in Egypt in the Context on the Open Door Policy / l'Evolution de la Structure du Credit et de la Politique Monetaire en Egypte et Politique de la Porte Ouverte". Savings and Development. 4 (4). Giordano Dell-Amore Foundation: 320–341. ISSN 0393-4551. JSTOR 25829755.
