= Egyptian Exchange =

Stock exchange in Egypt

Egyptian Exchange البورصة المصرية (Egyptian Arabic)

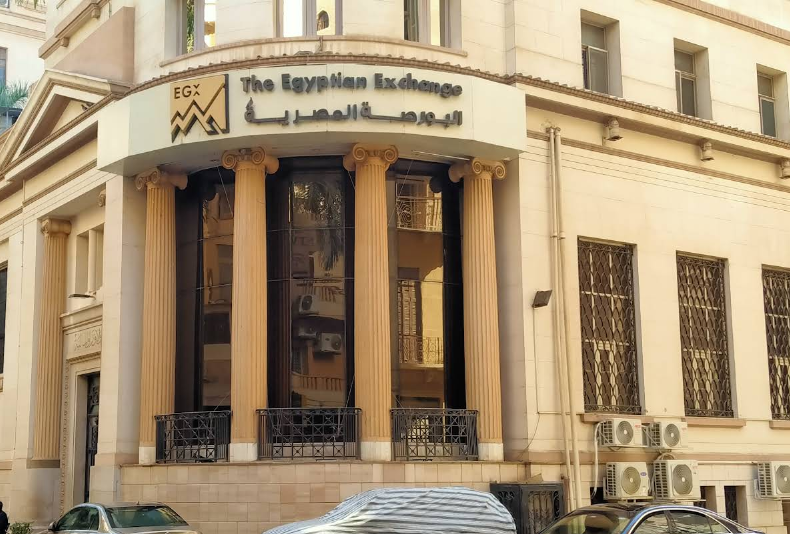
- Type: Stock exchange
- Location: Cairo, Egypt
- Founded: 1883
- Key people: Omar Radwan (Chairman)
- Currency: Egyptian pound
- No. of listings: 303
- Market cap: US$50.1 billion (E£2.5 trillion)
- Indices: EGX 30; EGX 50; EGX 70; EGX 100
- Website: egx.com

The Egyptian Exchange (EGX), Egypt's stock exchange, comprises two exchanges, Cairo and Alexandria, both governed by the same board of directors and sharing the same trading, clearing and settlement systems. Presently, the chairman of the Egyptian Exchange is Omar Radwan.

Transactions taking place in the stock exchange are not subject to capital gains tax. Dividends distributed by companies listed on the exchange to shareholders are also not subject to income tax. However, in 2013, a 0.001 percent tax on all stock market transactions was imposed. In 2013, the Ministry of Finance announced that the government intended to repeal a 10 percent capital gains tax imposed on mergers and acquisitions the year earlier, as well as a planned tax on cash dividends, and refund investors who paid it.

The Egyptian Exchange is a member of the Federation of Euro-Asian Stock Exchanges.

== History ==
The origins of Egypt's stock exchange can be traced back to 1883 with the establishment of the first futures market in Alexandria. By 1899, under the rule of Khedive Abbas II, the exchange relocated to a new premises on Muhammad Ali Square, today known as El Manshiyya. In 1902, the Brokers' Syndicate was formed, setting the initial regulations for stock market activities.

In 1903, the Egyptian Company for Banking and Stock Exchange was founded in Cairo as a limited liability company by a group of investors and brokers. They selected the former Ottoman Bank building, now known as the Groppi Building, on Maghrabi Street as the company's headquarters. The Brokers' Syndicate established market conditions, including listing criteria, trading rules, and mechanisms for resolving disputes among brokers and handling public complaints.

By 1908, a proper trading platform had emerged in Cairo, located opposite the French Consulate, where investors could watch market activities. The first legislation governing stock exchanges was enacted on November 8, 1909. In 1928, the exchange moved to its current location on El Sharifin Street. This new headquarters was financed by a company founded by brokers, following the conclusion of the old company's operations.

The Egyptian stock exchange plummeted 6.25% following the beginning of the Egyptian revolution of 2011 on 25 January. It closed at the end of trading on 27 January after the benchmark EGX 30 Index (EGX30) plunged 16 percent that week amid the uprising. The exchange reopened on the 23rd of March after being closed for almost 8 weeks. The market fell by a further 8.9% on reopening.

== See also ==
- CASE 30
- List of African stock exchanges
- List of major stock exchanges
- List of stock market indices
