= Hisham Ramez =

Egyptian economist

Hisham Ramez هشام رامز
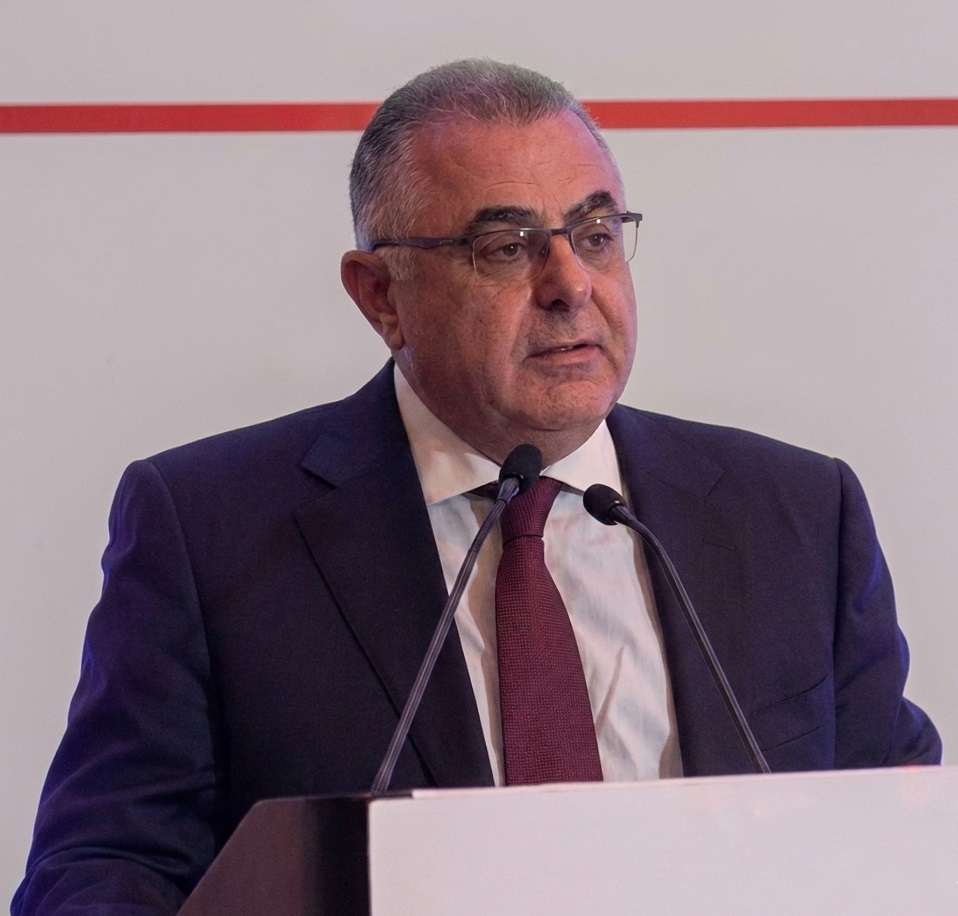
- Hisham Ramez in 2016

CEO of Arab International Bank
- Incumbent
- Assumed office 16 April 2016
- Preceded by: Gamal Negm

Governor of the Central Bank of Egypt
- In office 3 February 2013 – 27 November 2015
- Preceded by: Farouk El Okdah
- Succeeded by: Tarek Hassan Amer

CEO of Commercial International Bank
- In office 2011–2013
- Preceded by: Hisham Ezz Alarab
- Succeeded by: Hisham Ezz Alarab

CEO of Suez Canal Bank
- In office 2006–2007
- Preceded by: Ahmed Shawky
- Succeeded by: Haytham Farajallah

CEO of Egyptian Gulf Bank
- In office 1996–2006
- Preceded by: Mohamed Kamal El-Din
- Succeeded by: Omar Abdel Aziz El-Sisi

Personal details
- Born: September 28, 1959 (age 66) Cairo, Egypt
- Citizenship: Egyptian
- Spouse: Jehan Farid
- Education: Cairo University
- Occupation: Economist
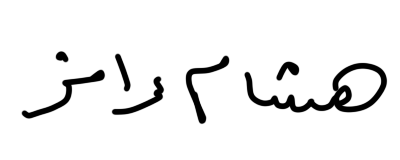
- Signature

Hisham Ramez Abdel Hafez (Arabic: هشام رامز; born September 28, 1959) is an Egyptian financier. He was governor of the Central Bank of Egypt from 2013 until 2015. He is the current Chairman of Arab International Bank.

== Career ==
Hisham Ramez held several positions, including CEO of Egyptian Gulf Bank (1996–2006); CEO of the Suez Canal Bank (2006–2007): CEO of the Commercial International Bank (2011–2013) and as First Deputy Governor to Farouk El-Okda (2007–2011).

=== Governor of the Central Bank of Egypt ===
The Presidency issued a statement clarifying that former President Mohamed Morsi had appointed Hisham Ramez as Governor of the Central Bank, succeeding Dr. Farouk El-Okda, who had submitted his resignation to President Morsi approximately three weeks prior.

His mandate was marked by immense economic volatility. Following the 2011 political unrest, Egypt faced severe pressure on its foreign currency reserves and the value of the Egyptian pound. To combat the dollar shortage and protect the country's dwindling reserves, Ramez implemented highly debated monetary policies, including placing strict caps on dollar-denominated bank deposits to curtail the currency black market.

=== Post CBE leadership ===
On April 24, 2016, he was named Chairman of Arab International Bank for a 3-years term.
