= Tarek Hassan Amer =

Egyptian economist

Tarek Hassan Amer طارق عامر
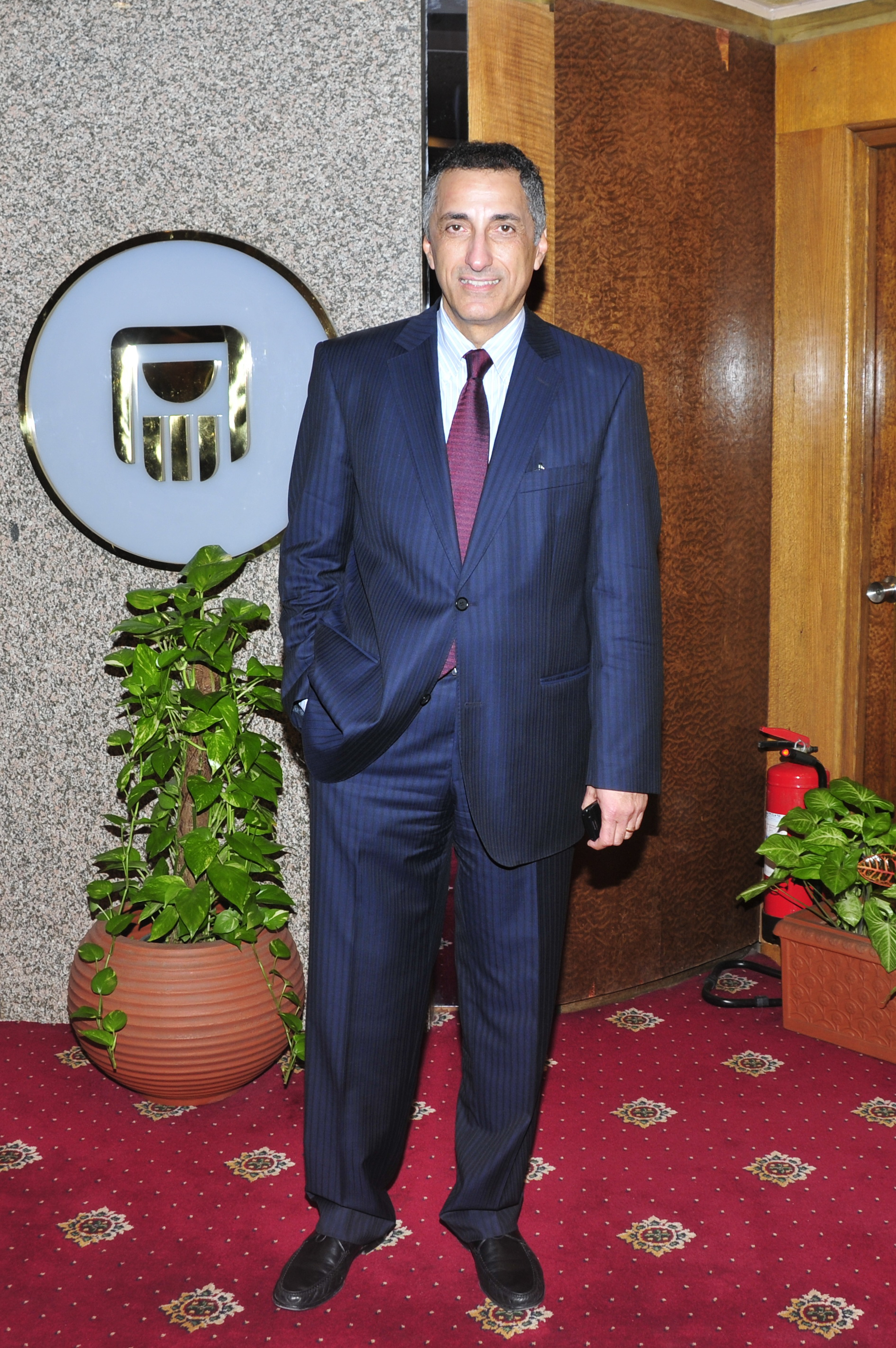
- Tarek Hassan Amer in 2011

Advisor to the President of Egypt
- Incumbent
- Assumed office 17 August 2022

Governor of the Central Bank of Egypt
- In office 25 November 2015 – 17 August 2022
- Preceded by: Hisham Ramez
- Succeeded by: Hassan Abdullah

Personal details
- Born: June 11, 1957 (age 69) Cairo, Egypt
- Citizenship: Egyptian
- Education: American University in Cairo
- Occupation: Economist
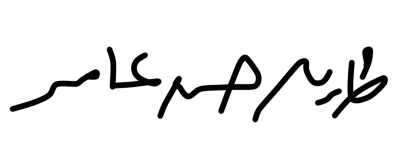
- Signature

Tarek Hassan Nour El-Din Amer (Arabic: طارق عامر; born June 11, 1957) is an Egyptian financier and a presidential adviser. He was governor of the Central Bank of Egypt from 2015 until 2022. Amer is the nephew of Field Marshal Abdel Hakim Amer and the son of Hassan Amer, the former chairman of Zamalek Sporting Club.

== Biography ==
Tarek Amer holds a Bachelor of Science degree in Economics and Management from the American University in Cairo.

Amer served as Deputy Governor of the Central Bank during Farouk El-Okda's tenure, from 2003 to 2008.

He served as Chairman of the Board of the National Bank of Egypt from 2008 until his resignation in 2013. His tenure was highly praised in Egyptian financial circles.

He was among the leading candidates to succeed El-Okda, along with Hisham Ramez and Mohamed Barakat. He assumed the governorship on November 27, 2015, after Hisham Ramez's resignation, following his appointment by Egyptian President Abdel Fattah El-Sisi. He fully liberalized the exchange rate of the Egyptian pound, allowing it to be determined by supply and demand in the money market (floating the pound) on November 3, 2016. He issued the first plastic 10 pound note.

On 17 August, 2022 while negotiations for a new international monetary program were in motion, and the rising inflation due to Russo Ukraine war, Amer announced his resignation as Governor of the Central Bank .

President El-Sisi accepted Amer's resignation and appointed him as Advisor to the President of Egypt.

== Awards ==
- He was named Best Central Bank Governor of 2017 in the Middle East and North Africa region, according to Global Markets magazine.
- He was named Best Arab Central Bank Governor of 2017 by the Union of Arab Banks.
- He received the Arab World's Leading Banker Award for 2018 from Al-Ahram Foundation.
- He received the annual African Banker Award for Best African Central Bank Governor in 2019.
- Global Finance also ranked Tarek Amer among the world's best central bank governors for 2022.
