= Hassan Abdullah =

Egyptian Governor of The Central Bank of Egypt (born 1960)

Hassan Abdullah حسن عبد الله
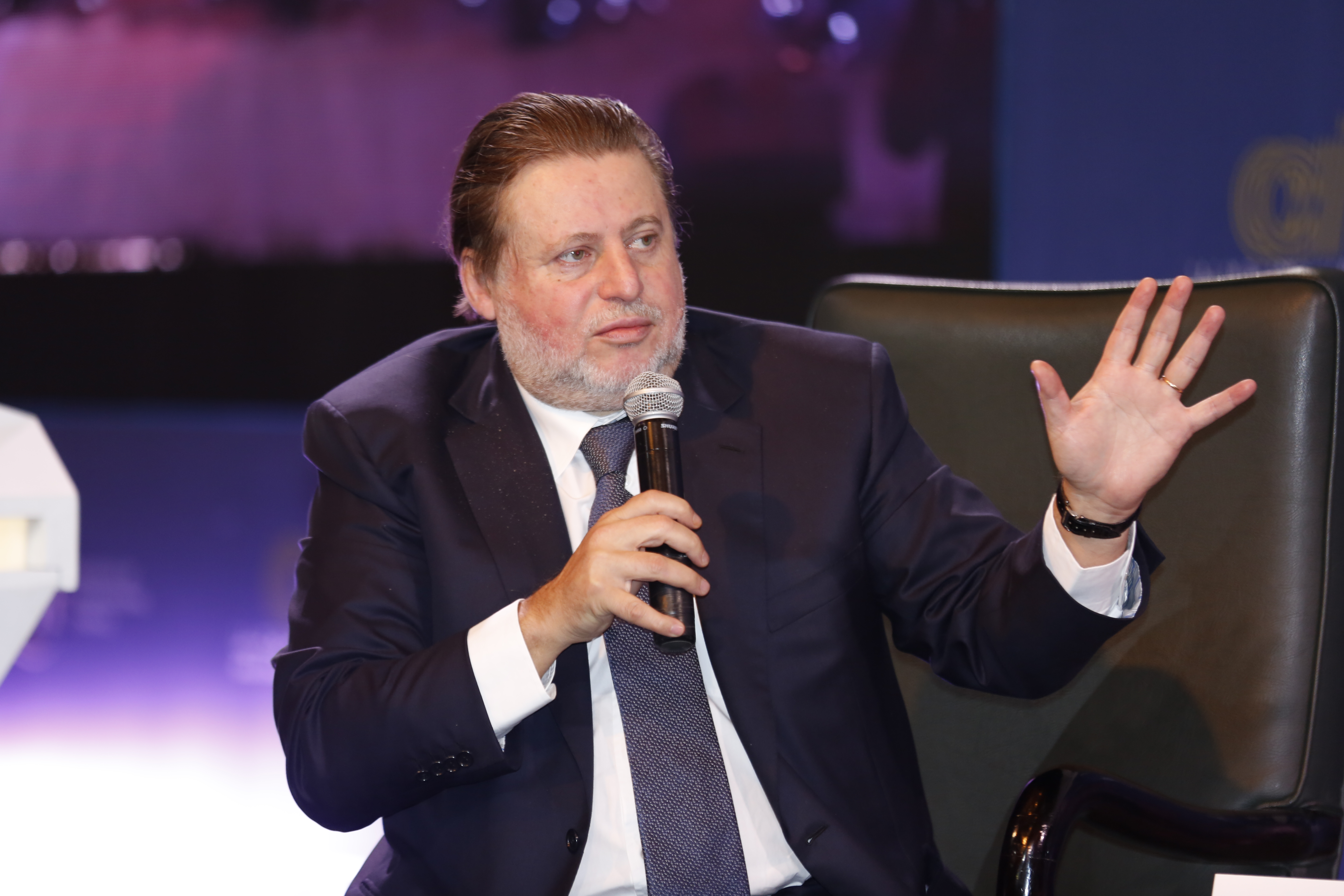
- Hassan Abdullah in 2015

Governor of the Central Bank of Egypt
- Incumbent
- Assumed office 17 August 2022
- Preceded by: Tarek Hassan Amer

CEO of Arab African Internatıonal Bank
- In office 2002–2018
- Preceded by: Ali Abdul Rahman Al-Bader
- Succeeded by: Sherif Alwi

Personal details
- Born: August 1, 1960 (age 65) Cairo, Egypt
- Citizenship: Egyptian
- Education: American University in Cairo
- Occupation: Financier
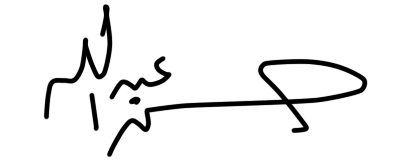
- Signature

Hassan Abdullah (Arabic: حسن عبد الله; born August 1, 1960) is an Egyptian financier. He is the current governor of the Central Bank of Egypt.

== Biography ==
Hassan Abdullah was born in Cairo in 1960 to Egyptian parents. He attended the Port Said School in Zamalek for his junior and high school education. He went on to attend the American University in Cairo (AUC), where he graduated with a BA in Business Administration in 1982. Abdullah returned to AUC in 1992 to receive his MBA.

In 1982, Abdullah joined he Arab African Internatıonal Bank (AAIB) at a position in the bank's dealing room. He moved to AAIB's New York City branch in 1988 while working in bond swaps to play a part in managing the bank's US policy. In 1994, he was promoted to Assistant General Manager, then to General Manager in 1999. In 2002, he was appointed Vice Chairman and CEO of the bank until 2018. He is also a board member at the American University in Cairo (AUC).

On August 18, 2022, he was appointed Acting Governor of the CBE. His mandat was characterized by Transitioning toward a flexible exchange rate regime and an inflation-targeting framework. And Steering the economy through regional geopolitical tensions, helping stabilize international reserves to historic highs, and reducing inflation peaks.

== Career ==
- Chief Executive Officer of Arab African International Bank (AAIB)
- Chairman of UBAF Hong Kong
- Board member of UBAF Paris
- Board member of UBAC Curaçao
- Board member of London Stock Exchange - London Africa Advisory Group "LAAG"
- Vice Chairman of German-Arab Chamber of Industry and Commerce
- Founder and Chairman of "We owe it to Egypt"
- Chairman of the Arab African Investment Management Company
- Chairman of Sandah for Microfinance
- Member of the Strategic Advisory Board of the School of Business at the AUC
- Board member of Arab Educational Information Network – Shamaa.
