= Mahmoud Abou El Oyoun =

Egyptian economist

Mahmoud Abou El Oyoun محمود أبو العيون
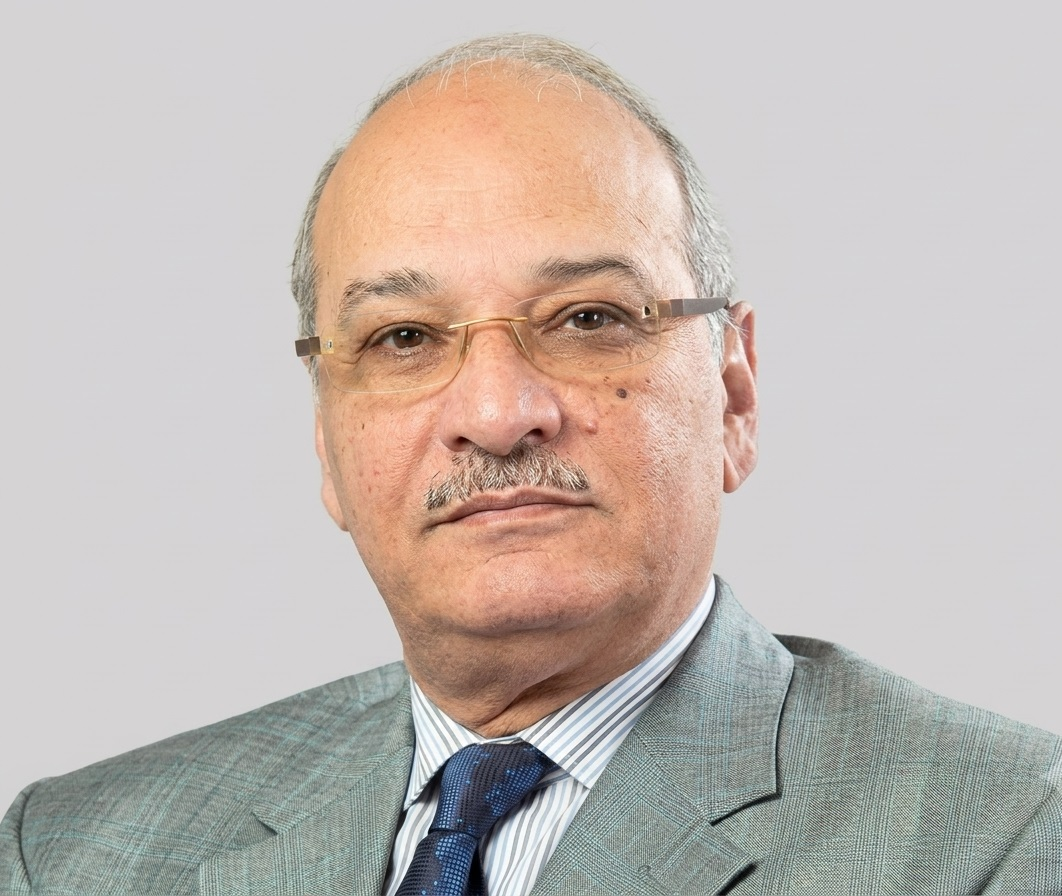
- Mahmoud in 2002

Governor of the Central Bank of Egypt
- In office 1 November 2001 – 3 December 2003
- Preceded by: Ismail Hassan Mohamed
- Succeeded by: Farouk El Okdah

Personal details
- Born: 1952; 74 years ago Cairo, Egypt
- Citizenship: Egyptian
- Education: Assiut University
- Occupation: Economist
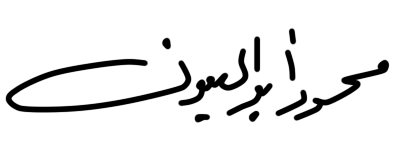
- Signature

Mahmoud Abou El Oyoun (Arabic: محمود أبو العيون; born 1952) is an Egyptian economist. He served as Governor of the Central Bank of Egypt from 2001 until December 2003.

== Biography ==
=== Education ===
Bachelor's degree in Economics in 1973 from Assiut University. (1974), he worked as a teaching assistant at Zagazig University, continuing his studies until obtaining a Master's degree (1980). He then traveled to the United States on a scholarship to obtain his doctorate (1986) from the University of Kansas. In 1990, he was promoted to Assistant professor, in 1996, he was promoted to Professor of Economics at Zagazig University.

He was appointed advisor to the Minister of Economy from (1986–1992), while served as advisor to the Minister of Tourism and Civil Aviation (1987–1992). In 1988, he was appointed to the board of directors of the Suez Canal Bank and also to the Tourism Development Company. In 1990, he was appointed Deputy Governor of the Central Bank and the first Executive director of the Egyptian Banking Institute, a position he held until 1992. In 1992, he was appointed Economic Advisor to the Kuwait Fund for Arab Economic Development, a post he held until 1999, when he was appointed Deputy Governor of the Central Bank.

=== Governor of the Central Bank ===
In 2001, he was appointed Governor of the Central Bank of Egypt. His mandate was characterized by a dispute between him and Prime Minister Atef Ebeid, who opposed the Central Bank's independence and interfered in its operations. The Prime Minister also floated the exchange rate without consulting him. All of this led to his dismissal in December 2003.

=== Kuwaiti career ===
Following his dismissal, he moved to Kuwait, where he worked as a consultant to the government, preparing the economic feasibility study for the Mubarak Al Kabeer Port. In December 2004, he was appointed Senior Advisor to the Kuwait Fund for Arab Economic Development. In 2006, he was appointed Advisor to the Kuwaiti Minister of Finance, a position he held until 2010 when he was chosen as CEO of Kuwait International Bank. He resigned from this post in 2011.
