= Mohamed Shalaby =

Egyptian economist

Mohamed Amin Shalaby محمد أمين شلبي

Governor of the Central Bank of Egypt
- In office 21 February 1982 – 31 March 1985
- Preceded by: Mohamed Abd El Fatah Ibrahim
- Succeeded by: Ali Mohamed Negm

Personal details
- Born: 1924 Cairo, Egypt
- Died: 1997 (aged 72–73) Cairo, Egypt
- Citizenship: Egyptian
- Occupation: Economist
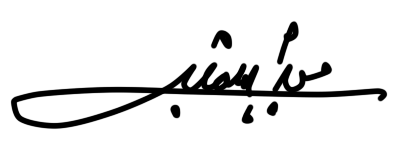
- Signature

Mohamed Amin Shalaby (Arabic: محمد أمين شلبي) 1924-1997 was an Egyptian economist. He served as Governor of the Central Bank of Egypt from 1982 until 1985.

== Career ==
During his three years as governor, Shalaby managed Egypt's monetary policy during the post-Sadat era under President Hosni Mubarak, facing initial structural challenges regarding foreign exchange management and credit policies. His administration focused on stabilizing the domestic banking registry and balancing the state-guided economy of the early 1980s.
