= Mahmoud Salah Eldin Hamed =

Egyptian economist

Mahmoud Salah Eldin Hamed محمود صلاح الدين حامد

Governor of the Central Bank of Egypt
- In office 10 November 1986 – 12 October 1993
- Preceded by: Ali Mohamed Negm
- Succeeded by: Ismail Hassan Mohamed

Minister of finance of Egypt
- In office 3 January 1982 – 11 November 1986
- Preceded by: Abdul Razaq Abdul Mageed
- Succeeded by: Mohammed Ahmed El Razaz
- In office 19 November 1976 – 10 October 1978
- Preceded by: Ahmed Abu Ismail
- Succeeded by: Aly Lotfy Mahmoud

Personal details
- Born: 20 December 1927 (age 98) Monufia Governorate, Egypt
- Citizenship: Egyptian
- Education: Cairo University
- Occupation: Economist
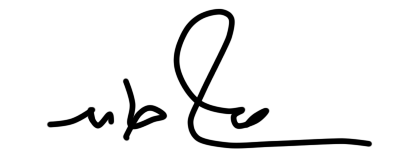
- Signature

Mahmoud Salah Eldin Hamed (Arabic: محمود صلاح الدين حامد; born 20 December 1927) is an Egyptian economist. He served as Finance minister from 1976 until 1978 and from 1982 and 1986. He also served as Governor of the Central Bank of Egypt from 1986 until 1993.

He worked as a professor of economics at the Faculty of Commerce and the Faculty of Economics and Political Science at Cairo University, as well as at the National Planning Institute and the National Institute for Administrative Development.

== Biography ==
He graduated as Bachelor in economics in the Cairo University.

Hamed served as a core architect of Egypt's fiscal framework during an era of significant transition in the 1970s and 1980s, holding the office of Minister of Finance across two distinct terms.

During his governance of the central bank, he was highly regarded by international financial institutions for his analytical support and steering of Egypt's macro-economic reforms. He spearheaded the implementation of the Financial Policy for Adjustment and Growth frameworks in cooperation with the World Bank.

He served as an appointed director on the board of the British Arab Commercial Bank, in 1991, a position he held until his formal resignation from the role in March 1994.
