= Farouk El Okdah =

Farouk El Okdah فاروق العقدة

Governor of the Central Bank of Egypt
- In office 3 December 2003 – 31 January 2013
- Preceded by: Mahmoud Abou El Oyoun
- Succeeded by: Hisham Ramez

CEO of National Bank of Egypt
- In office January 2003 – December 2003
- Preceded by: Ahmed Diaa El-Din
- Succeeded by: Hussein Abdel Aziz

Personal details
- Born: August 22, 1946 (age 80) Dakahlia Governorate, Egypt
- Citizenship: Egyptian
- Education: Ain Shams University
- Occupation: Economist
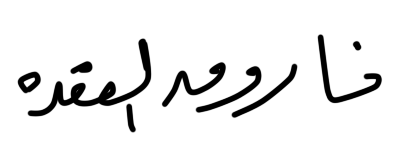
- Signature

Farouk Abd El Baky El Okdah (Arabic: ففاروق العقدة, born August 1946) was the governor of the Central Bank of Egypt (CBE) from December 2003 to February 2013.

== Biography ==
Born in the Dakahlia Governorate in 1946, El-Okda graduated of B.S. In Commerce Accounting Major from Ain Shams University (1965); Master of Accounting (with honors) from Cairo University (1975); Master of Business Administration from The Wharton School, University of Pennsylvania (1981) and PhD. in Business and Applied Economics from The Wharton School, University of Pennsylvania.

== Career ==
Instructor in accounting and finance, The Wharton School, University of Pennsylvania (1978–1982); assistant vice president – Middle East Division, vice president and Africa District manager, Irving Trust Company, New York (1984–1988); vice president, regional manager and advisor, The Bank of New York (1989–2002); managing director, International Company for Leasing "Incolease" (1997–2002).

From January 2003 until December 2003 ha acted as chairman and chief executive officer of the National Bank of Egypt (NBE), in which he became the governor of Central Bank of Egypt from December 2003 until February 2013.

=== Governor of Central Bank of Egypt ===
He led a reform plan based on five main axes, which are: merging small banks to strengthen banking entities; the second axis was the privatization of one of the public sector banks, and Alexbank was chosen for this purpose and succeeded in completing the deal despite the obstacles that surrounded it; the third axis was the privatization of public banks’ shares in joint banks in preparation for merging these banks to create stronger and more competitive banking entities; the fourth axis was the financial and administrative restructuring of public sector banks; and the fifth axis was concerned with solving the problem of bank failures to provide a suitable climate for the economic growth process.

==== 2011 Egyptian Revolution ====
During the 2011 Revolution, the country's financial system had to abruptly pivot from a period of robust post-reform growth to emergency crisis management. Despite severe macroeconomic shocks, the banking sector demonstrated remarkable resilience, banks across Egypt closed their doors for roughly a week (and faced intermittent closures throughout February) as street protests paralyzed the economy. When banks finally reopened on February 6, 2011, the CBE imposed strict daily withdrawal limits to prevent a run on banks. Individuals were capped at pulling out EGP 50,000 and $10,000 in foreign currency per day. Despite closures, an estimated $1.5 billion of foreign investment left Egyptian Treasury bills in the earliest wave of the crisis, as international investors and local wealthy individuals sought to de-risk. Following the Egyptian Revolution, HSBC was accused of helping to enrich high-ranking Egyptian political and economic officials, who are now at the center of corruption investigations.
