= Egyptian passport =

Travel document

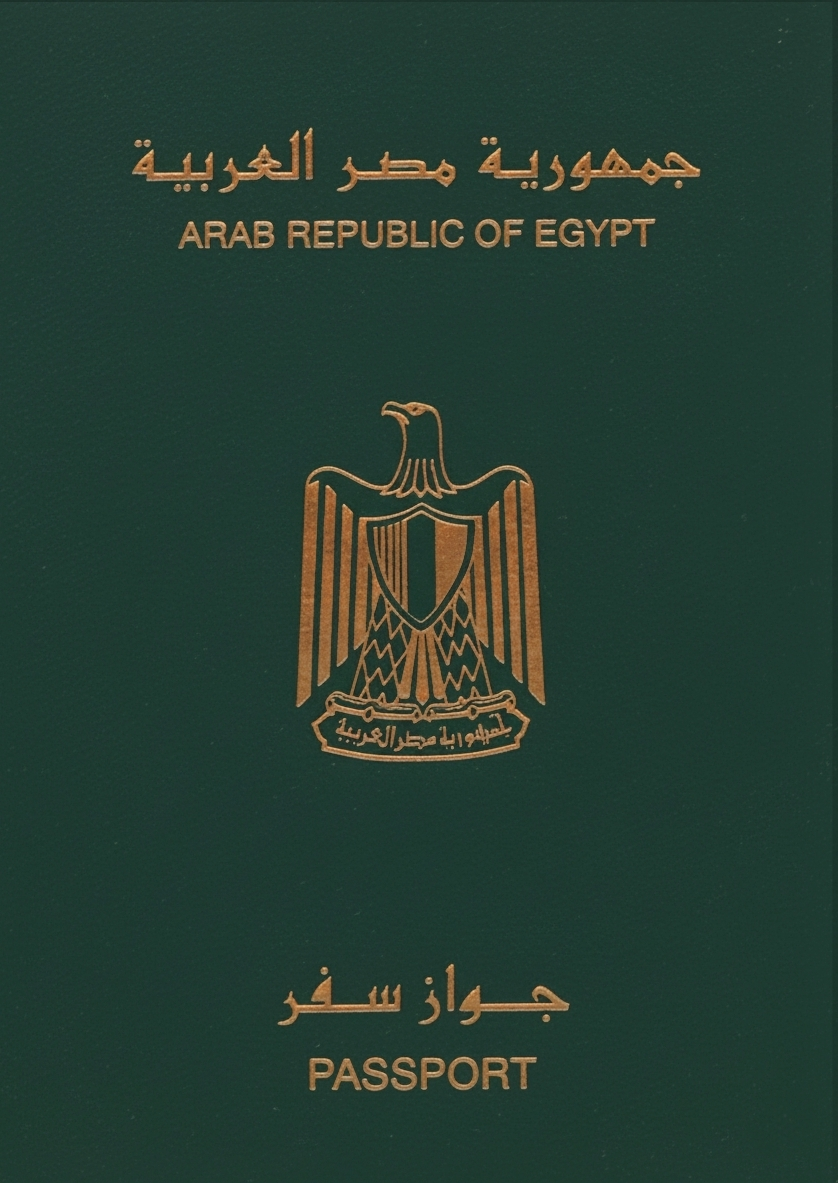
- The front cover of a contemporary Egyptian passport.
- Type: Passport
- Issued by: Egypt
- First issued: 27 January 2008 (current version)
- Purpose: Identification
- Eligibility: Egyptian citizenship
- Expiration: 7 years after acquisition
- Cost: E£1,000

Egyptian passports (Arabic: جواز السفر المصري) are issued to nationals of Egypt for the purpose of international travel. Besides serving as a proof of Egyptian citizenship, they facilitate the process of securing assistance from Egyptian consular officials abroad if needed. Egyptian passports are valid for seven years for adults, and is issued for lesser periods for school or college students, or those who have not finalized their status of the military conscription. Starting in 2008, The Egyptian government introduced newer machine-readable passport (MRP), in order to comply with international passport standards and requirements with 96.7% conformance to ICAO Document 9303. The newer passports offer better security and state-of-the-art anti forging parameters and have a soft cover.

== Passport Features ==
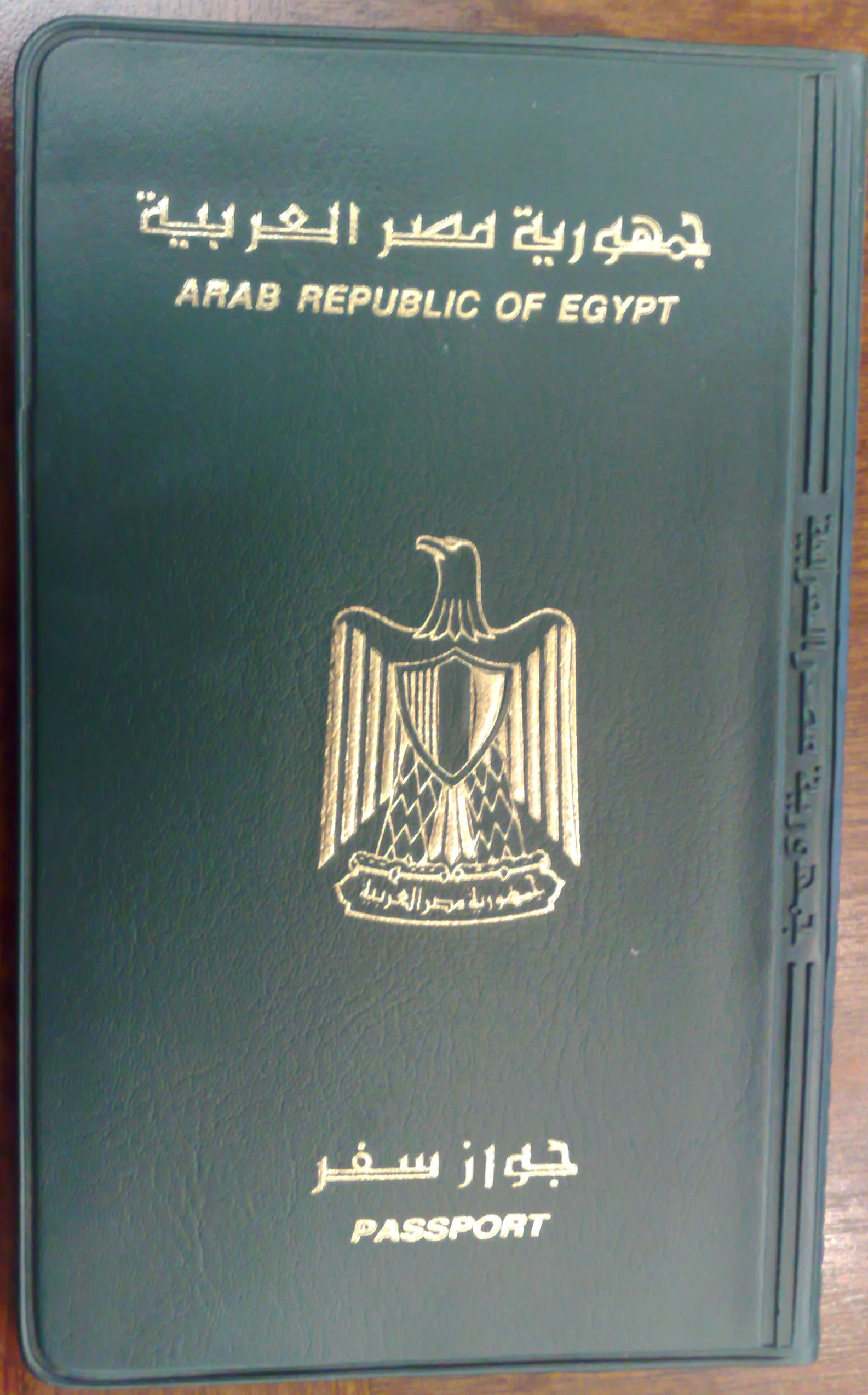
Cover of the previous Egyptian passport, used until 2008.

Egyptian passports are dark green, with the Egyptian Coats of Arms emblazoned in the centre of the front cover. The word "جواز سفر•PASSPORT" (the former being the Arabic equivalent) is inscribed below the coat of arms, and "جمهورية مصر العربية•ARAB REPUBLIC OF EGYPT" above. The passport contains 52 pages. The passports are opened from their right end and their pages are arranged from right to left.

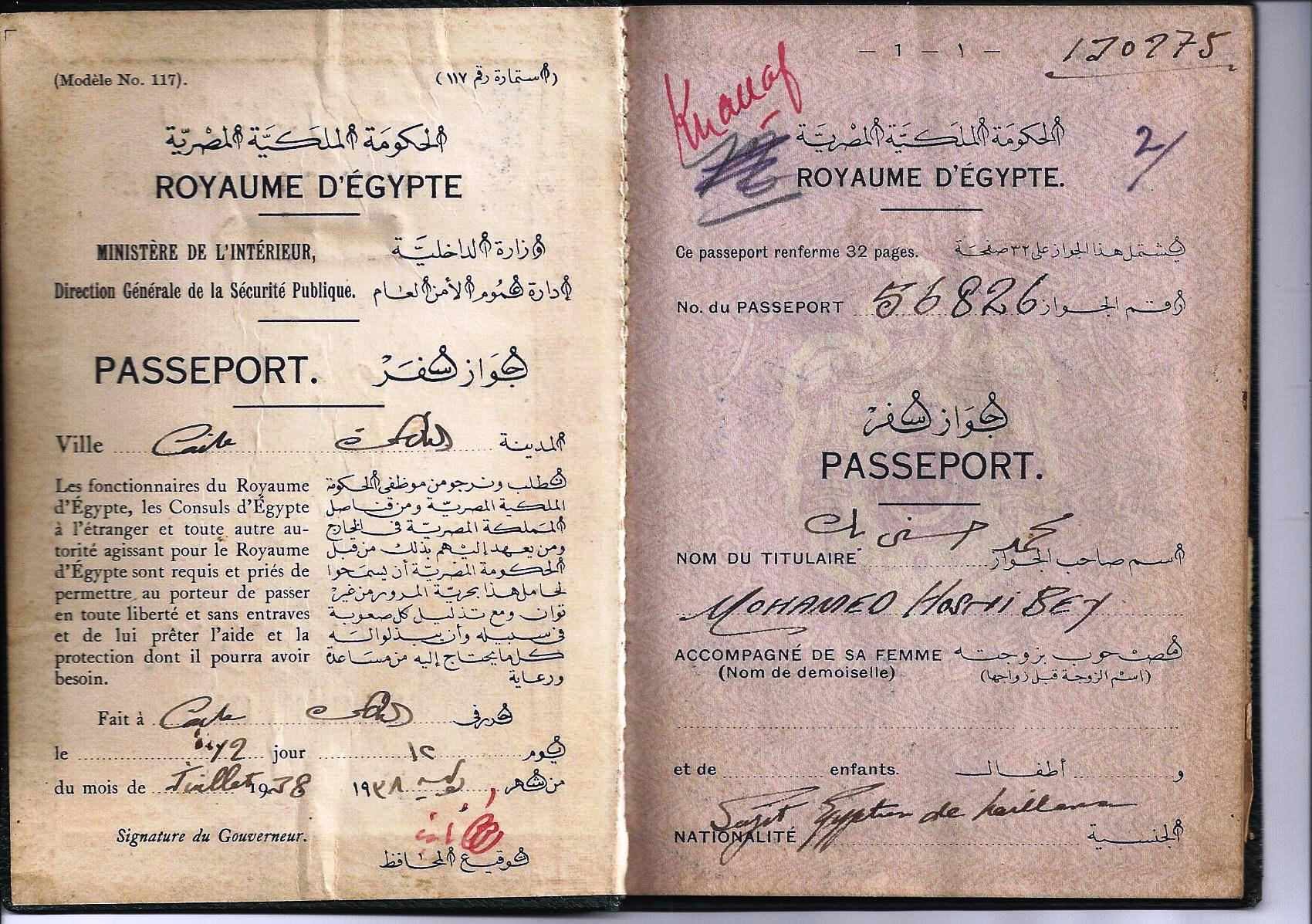
1938 Egyptian passport used for travelling to Germany.

== Issuing Requirements ==
Egyptian passports are usually issued to Egyptian citizens for a period of seven years. To apply for a passport, either an Egyptian National ID card is required, or a computerized birth certificate for those below the age of 15. Students must furnish evidence of enrollment at the time of application. Some categories of applicants, mainly first-time applicants who are not students or pensioners, are required to pay a guarantee at the time of application. Applicants with a history of frequent travel are exempted from this requirement.

=== Issuing Authorities ===
All Egyptian passports are issued from the Ministry of Interior's Travel Documents, Immigration and Nationality Administration (TDINA) bureaus or from an Egyptian Consulate abroad. The new MRP is currently issued in Egypt only and Egyptian embassies and consulates overseas may only receive applications and return passports to applicants, but cannot print machine-readable documents, and can only issue handwritten emergency passports if required. An application for a passport made in London, for example, would be forwarded to the Egyptian Ministry of Foreign Affairs in Cairo for processing. As a result, all Egyptian passports requested at Egyptian diplomatic missions contain issuing authority number "88."

Rarely, is there an issue with outside passports, but commonly for those living abroad. When it happen it is a lengthy issue. If an Egyptian Embassy in America allows for a passport extension there, in order to allow the passport holder to travel back to Egypt and update it for the requested 7 years, they will require security measures from the Consulate in America detailing the short notice extinction. Process can take upwards of a month because of the use of faxes in the consulates in Egypt.

=== Identity Information Pages ===
Egyptian Passport Information appears on the hard cover, and includes the data as shown in the following order

- Photo of Passport Holder
- Type [of document, which is "P" for "passport"]
- Code [of the issuing country, which is "EGY" for "Arab Republic of Egypt"]
- Passport No.
- Full Name
- Date of Birth
- Place of Birth
- Nationality
- Sex
- Date of Issue
- Date of Expiry
- Issuing Office
- National ID number (in Arabic)
- Profession
- Name of Husband and Nationality (in Arabic)-married females only
- Military Status (in Arabic)-males only
- Address (in Arabic)
- Machine Readable Zone
- PDF417 barcode (encodes the machine readable code + passport serial number + issuing office number)
- No Signature Is Required

=== Passport Note ===
The passports contain a note from the issuing state that is addressed to the authorities of all other states, identifying the bearer as a citizen of that state and requesting that they be allowed to pass and be treated according to international norms. The textual portions of Egyptian passports is printed in both English and Arabic. The note inside of Egyptian passports states, in English:

The Minister of Foreign Affairs requests all whom it may concern to permit the bearer of this Passport to pass, assist and protect him whenever necessary.

=== Languages ===
The textual portions of Egyptian passports were traditionally printed in both Arabic and French, including both during and after the United Arab Republic union with Syria. Recently, English took the place of French, which no longer appears on the passport.

== Visa requirements map ==
Visa requirements for Egyptian citizens Egypt Visa-free Visa on arrival eVisa Visa available both on arrival or online Visa required

Visa requirements for Egyptian citizens are administrative entry restrictions by the authorities of other states placed on citizens of Egypt. As of April 2025, Egyptian citizens had visa-free or visa on arrival access to 50 countries and territories, ranking the Egyptian passport 87th in the world according to the Henley Passport Index.

== See also ==
- Visa requirements for Egyptian citizens
