= Ali Mohamed Negm =

Egyptian economist

Ali Mohamed Negm علي محمد نجم
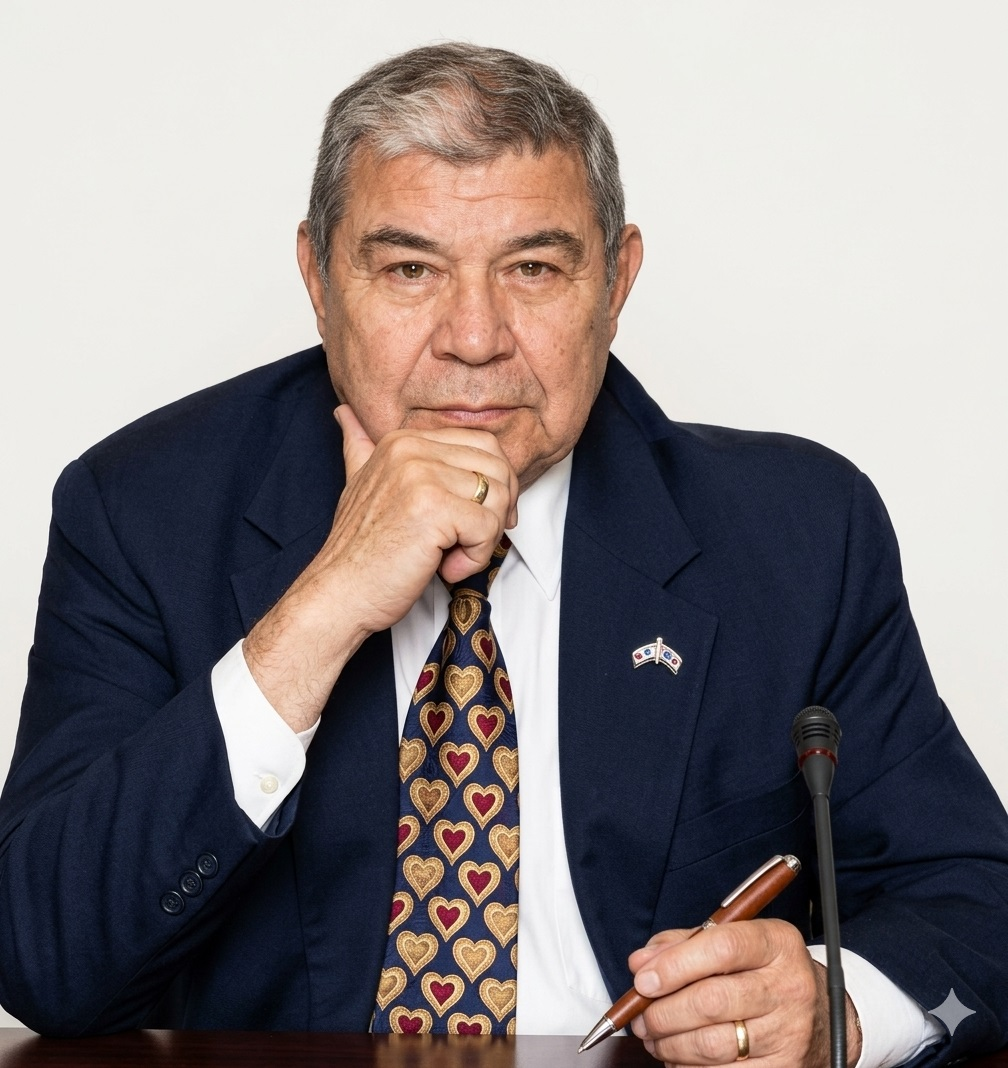

Governor of the Central Bank of Egypt
- In office 31 March 1985 – 9 November 1986
- Preceded by: Mohamed Shalaby
- Succeeded by: Mahmoud Salah Eldin Hamed

Personal details
- Born: 10 April 1930 Sharqia Governorate, Egypt
- Died: 22 May 2007 (aged 77) Cairo, Egypt
- Citizenship: Egyptian
- Education: Cairo University
- Occupation: Economist
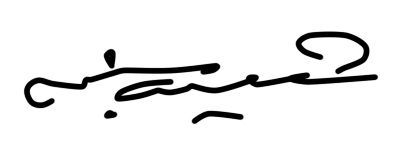
- Signature

Ali Mohamed Negm (Arabic: علي محمد نجم; 10 April 1930-22 May 2007) was an Egyptian economist. He served as Governor of the Central Bank of Egypt from 1985 until 1986.

== Biography ==
He graduated both, Bachelor’s degree in Commerce and Economics, as well as his Master’s degree from Cairo University. And a post-graduate studies focusing deeply on global macroeconomics and public finance in the American University.

In March 1985, He was appointed as central bank governor. Negm governed Egypt's monetary framework during a complex macroeconomic era for the Middle East, characterized by shifting regional capital flows, currency valuation pressures, and structural adjustments in state-guided banking systems.

== Awards ==
- Italian Order of Merit, Commander. (1983).
