= Ismail Hassan Mohamed =

Egyptian economist

Ismail Hassan Mohamed إسماعيل حسن محمد

Governor of the Central Bank of Egypt
- In office 13 October 1993 – 12 October 2001
- Preceded by: Mahmoud Salah Eldin Hamed
- Succeeded by: Mahmoud Abou El Oyoun

Personal details
- Born: 26 July 1936 Cairo, Egypt
- Died: 11 April 2026 (aged 89) Cairo, Egypt
- Citizenship: Egyptian
- Education: Ain Shams University
- Occupation: Economist
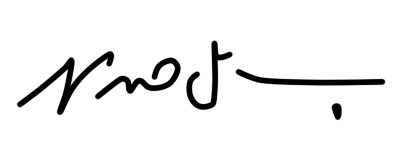
- Signature

Ismail Hassan Mohamed (Arabic: إسماعيل حسن محمد; 26 July 1936-11 April 2026) was an Egyptian economist. He served as Governor of the Central Bank of Egypt from 1993 until 2001.

He is widely known within Arab financial circles for his conservative approach to monetary policy and his focus on economic sovereignty. Throughout his career and in subsequent economic policy debates. Hassan has consistently pushed for the domestic substitution of imported commodities.

== Biography ==
He graduated as Bachelor in economics in the Ain Shams University in 1959.

Ismail Hassan was appointed Governor of the Central Bank of Egypt on October 13, 1993, succeeding Mahmoud Hamed. He served in this capacity for exactly eight years, concluding his term on October 12, 2001.

During his tenure in the 1990s, Hassan was tasked with steering Egypt's monetary policy through structural adjustment programs, managing the stability of the Egyptian pound, and navigating complex regional financial environments.

Following his governorship at the Central Bank, He was appointed as Chairman of Misr Iran Development Bank. He remained an influential figure and consultant in Egyptian banking.
