= Visa requirements for Egyptian citizens =

Administrative entry restrictions

An Egyptian passport

Visa requirements for Egyptian citizens are administrative entry restrictions imposed on citizens of Egypt by the authorities of other states.

As of June 2026, Egyptian citizens had visa-free or visa on arrival access to 50 countries and territories, ranking the Egyptian passport 86th in the world according to the Henley Passport Index and It is ranked 72nd by the Global Passport Power Rank.

However, according to the most up-to-date list compiled on this wiki, Egyptian passport holders can enter 73 countries (not counting dependent and partially unrecognized territories) with Visa on arrival, or easy e-Visas or complete visa free under certain conditions (See table and map below). In addition, several states have updated their rules recently to allow holders of valid Schengen / EU, UK, USA, Japan and Australia visas and residence permits to enter visa free under certain conditions, as listed in the table below.

Some countries require transit visas even if the Egyptian national remains airside (i.e. does not go through passport control). These include: Australia, Canada, New Zealand, United States, United Kingdom, and a minority of European states: Czech Republic, Poland, Romania and Spain. Some states also apply pre-flight measures (so-called OK To Board checks), leading some airlines to refuse passengers deemed risky

== Visa requirements map ==
Visa requirements for Egyptian citizens Egypt Visa not required Visa not required (conditional) Visa on arrival eVisa Visa available both on arrival or online Visa required

== Visa requirements ==
Country	Visa requirement	Allowed stay	Notes (excluding departure fees)
Afghanistan	eVisa	30 days	e-Visa : Visitors must arrive at Kabul International (KBL).; Visa is not required in case born in Afghanistan or can proof that one of their parents is a national of Afghanistan or born in Afghanistan.
Albania	eVisa	90 days	Visa free anytime of year for valid visa holders or residents of Schengen member states, the UK and US for stays up to 90 days within 180 days period.
Algeria	Visa required		Visitors on tours organized to some southern regions by an approved travel agency may obtain a visa on arrival for up to 30 days.
Andorra	Visa required		No border checkpoints in Andorra, but visitor must travel to France or Spain before reach Andorra, thus Schengen visa is required
Angola	eVisa		
Antigua and Barbuda	eVisa		
Argentina	Visa required		
Armenia	eVisa	120 days	May apply for an e-visa or visa on arrival only if holding a valid visa or valid permanent resident permit (resident card) issued by Australia, Belarus, Canada, Gulf Cooperation Council countries, Japan, New Zealand, Russia, Singapore, South Korea, European Union / Schengen Area member states, United Kingdom or United States; or alternatively by invitation.
Australia and territories	Online visa required		May apply online (Online Visitor e600 visa) but must provide biometrics in person.
Austria	Visa required		
Azerbaijan	Visa required		Visa on Arrival for holders of a valid UAE residence permit.
Bahamas	eVisa		
Bahrain	eVisa / Visa on arrival	14 days	
Bangladesh	Visa required		
Barbados	Visa not required		
Belarus	Visa required		Nationals of Egypt with a normal passport can enter for a maximum of 30 days with a multiple-entry visa issued by Switzerland or an EEA Member State which has been used but is still valid. They must arrive at and depart from Brest (BTQ), Gomel (GME), Grodno (GNA), Minsk (MSQ), Mogilev (MVQ) or Vitebsk (VTB) and their passport must be valid for at least 90 days longer than the duration of stay. They cannot arrive from or transit through Russian Fed.
Belgium	Visa required		
Belize	Visa required		Visa not required for U.S. permanent residents.
Benin	Visa not required	90 days	
Bhutan	eVisa	90 days	Visa fee is 40 USD per person and visa application may be processed within 5 business days with duration of stay of 90 days.; The Sustainable Development Fee (SDF) of 200 USD per person, per night for almost all visitors to Bhutan. Additionally, if payment is made in US dollars from September 1, 2023, to August 31, 2027, the SDF is US$100.
Bolivia	Online Visa		
Bosnia and Herzegovina	Visa required		Visa required unless holder of a valid US or a multiple-entry Schengen visa, or is an EU, non-EU Schengen or US permanent resident.
Botswana	eVisa	3 months	1 month: 300 Botswana Pula, 3 months: 500 Botswana Pula.
Brazil	Visa required		
Brunei	Visa required		
Bulgaria	Visa required		
Burkina Faso	eVisa / Visa on arrival	1 month	
Burundi	Visa on arrival	1 month	
Cambodia	eVisa / Visa on arrival	30 days	
Cameroon	eVisa		
Canada	Visa required		US permanent residents (Green card) holders can enter visa free
Cape Verde	Visa required		
Central African Republic	Visa required		
Chad	eVisa		
Chile	Visa required		
China	Visa required		
Colombia	Online visa		
Comoros	Visa on arrival	45 days	
Republic of the Congo	Visa required		
Democratic Republic of the Congo	eVisa	7 days	
Costa Rica	Visa required		Visa not required for U.S. permanent residents.
Côte d'Ivoire	eVisa	3 months	
Croatia	Visa required		
Cuba	eVisa	90 days	Can be extended up to 90 days with a fee.; Must be obtained prior to arrival from airline, Cuban embassy, or reputable third party.
Cyprus	Visa required		Visa required unless holding a valid two or multiple entry Schengen visa, or a residence permit issued by an EU member state.
Czech Republic	Visa required		
Denmark	Visa required		
Djibouti	eVisa	90 days	
Dominica	Visa not required	21 days	
Dominican Republic	Visa required		Visa not required for U.S. permanent residents but visitors must buy tourist card for US$10 at the airport.
Ecuador	Online Visa required		
El Salvador	Visa required		Visa waiver if visitor holds a valid visa issued by Canada, the United States or a Schengen member states
Equatorial Guinea	eVisa		
Eritrea	Visa required		
Estonia	Visa required		
Eswatini	Visa required		
Ethiopia	eVisa	90 days	Visa on arrival is obtainable only at Addis Ababa Bole International Airport.; e-Visa holders must arrive via Addis Ababa Bole International Airport.; e-Visa is available for 30 or 90 days.
Fiji	eVisa		
Finland	Visa required		
France	Visa required		
Gabon	eVisa	90 days	e-Visa holders must arrive via Libreville International Airport.
Gambia	Visa not required	90 days	Note: Tourists and others travelling on last minute bookings will be allowed entry but will be required to submit their passport to the Department of Immigration in Banjul within 48 Hours to be issued a proper visa.
Georgia	eVisa	30 days	Visa not required for holders of a valid EU, non-EU Schengen, UK, US and GCC visa or residence permit for stays up 90 days in any 180-day period.
Germany	Visa required		
Ghana	Free visa on arrival	60 days	Gratis visa issued on arrival free of charge.
Greece	Visa required		
Grenada	Visa required		
Guatemala	Visa required		Visa not required for holders of a valid U.S. visa and U.S. permanent residents for stays of up to 90 days within 180 day period.
Guinea	Visa not required		
Guinea-Bissau	Visa on arrival	90 days	
Guyana	eVisa	3 months	Guyana calls this a ‘Visa on Arrival’, but like an eVisa, the application must be made before travelling. Tourists with an approval letter from the Ministry of Home Affairs of Guyana can also obtain a visa on arrival for a stay of up to 30 days
Haiti	Visa not required	3 months	
Honduras	Visa required		Visa not required for holders of a valid U.S. visa and U.S. permanent residents for stays of up to 90 days within 180 day period.
Hungary	Visa required		
Iceland	Visa required		
India	Visa required		
Indonesia	e-VOA / Visa on arrival	30 days	Travelers arriving at Jakarta's Soekarno-Hatta International Airport (CGK), Bali's Ngurah Rai International Airport (DPS), Surabaya's Juanda International Airport (SUB), or Batam seaports must complete the ‘All Indonesia’ arrival form online within 3 days of arrival.; ravelers arriving at all other Indonesian airports and ports of entry must complete the separate health and customs declarations online within 3 days of arrival.; From October 1, 2025, travelers arriving at all ports of entry will be required to complete the ‘All Indonesia’arrival form online.
Iran	Visa not required	20 days	
Iraq	eVisa	30 days	
Ireland	Visa required		
Israel	Visa required		Visa not required for up to 14 days if entering through Taba and visiting up to Beersheba only.; Otherwise, a confirmation from the Israeli government is required before a visa is issued.
Italy	Visa required		
Jamaica	Visa required		Visa not required for U.S. permanent residents.
Japan	Visa required		Eligible for an e-Visa if residing in one these countries Australia, Brazil, Cambodia, Canada, India, Saudi Arabia, Singapore, South Africa, Taiwan, United Arab Emirates, United Kingdom, United States.
Jordan	Visa not required	1 month	
Kazakhstan	Visa required		e-Visa can be issued only if there is a valid invitation from the Kazakhstan side.
Kenya	Visa not required	60 days	
Kiribati	Visa not required	90 days	90 days within any 12-month period.
North Korea	Visa required		
South Korea	Visa required		Multiple-Entry Visa may be granted to persons who entered South Korea 4 or more times within the last 2 years, or 10 or more visits in total (one of those 10 visits should be within the last 2 years).; May apply online.
Kuwait	Visa required		
Kyrgyzstan	eVisa	60 days	e-Visa holders must arrive via Manas International Airport or Osh Airport or through land crossings with China (at Irkeshtam and Torugart), Kazakhstan (at Ak-jol, Ak-Tilek, Chaldybar, Chon-Kapka), Tajikistan (at Bor-Dobo, Kulundu, Kyzyl-Bel) and Uzbekistan (at Dostuk).
Laos	eVisa / Visa on arrival	30 days	18 (Note: Savannakhet Airport; Lanetoui - Mengkang (China); Meuangmom - Wan Pong (Myanmar); Banvang - Ban Khok Phai (Thailand); Namngeun - Huay Kon (Thailand); Paksan - Bueng Kan (Thailand); Paktaphan - Pak Saeng (Thailand); Pangmon - Ban Huak (Thailand); Phoudou (Thailand); Dak ta ock - Nam Giang (Vietnam); La Lai (Vietnam); Namkan (Vietnam); Namphao - Cau Treo (Vietnam); Namsoy - Na Meo (Vietnam); Naphao - Cha Lo (Vietnam); Pahang - Long Sap (Vietnam); Panghok - Tây Trang (Vietnam); Phoukeua - Bo Y (Vietnam)) of the 33 border crossings are only open to regular visa holders.; e-Visa may be used to enter Laos through the Luang Prabang, Pakse and Vientiane international airports, 3 Thai-Lao Friendship Bridges (Note: Vientiane (Friendship Bridge 1); Savannakhet (Friendship Bridge 2); Bokeo (Friendship Bridge 4)), in Boten (road and railroad), and in Vientiane (at Khamsavath railway station).; Visa on arrival is available at the Luang Prabang, Pakse and Vientiane international airports, 4 Thai-Lao Friendship Bridges (Note: Vientiane (Friendship Bridge 1); Savannakhet (Friendship Bridge 2); Khammouane (Friendship Bridge 3); Bokeo (Friendship Bridge 4)) and 7 border crossings. (Note: Nongnokkheane - Trapeang Kriel (Cambodia); Boten - Bo han (China); Golden Triangle/Samliemkham (Thailand); Khamsavath railway station (Thailand); Namheuang - Ban Na Kraseng (Thailand); Vang tao - Chongmek (Thailand); Dansavan - Lao Bảo (Vietnam))
Latvia	Visa required		
Lebanon	Visa on arrival (conditional)	30 days	Visa requirements include a copy of a reservation in a 3 to 5 star hotel or private residential address with telephone number in Lebanon, at least US$2,000 in cash, a non-refundable return or circle trip ticket, and no Israeli stamps, visas, or seals on passport.
Lesotho	Visa required		
Liberia	e-VOA	3 months	
Libya	Visa not required (conditional) / eVisa		Visa not required for male nationals aged under 18 or older than 45 and all females.; Persons with passports indication previous travel to Israel will be denied entry to Libya.
Liechtenstein	Visa required		
Lithuania	Visa required		
Luxembourg	Visa required		
Madagascar	eVisa/Visa on arrival	90 days	For stays of 61 to 90 days, the visa fee is US$59.
Malawi	eVisa	30 days	
Malaysia	Visa not required	90 days	Travelers must complete the Malaysia Digital Arrival Card (MDAC) online before traveling to Malaysia. Travelers can apply for the online Malaysia Digital Arrival Card (MDAC) within 3 days before their arrival.
Maldives	Free visa on arrival	30 days	
Mali	Visa required		
Malta	Visa required		
Marshall Islands	Visa on arrival	90 days	
Mauritania	eVisa	30 days	Available at Nouakchott–Oumtounsy International Airport.
Mauritius	Visa not required	90 days	
Mexico	Visa required		Visa is not required for holders of a valid multiple-entry visa of Canada, US, UK or a Schengen State and/or hold Permanent residency in Canada, Schengen State, Japan, UK, or the US; Entry may be refused by immigration officials for individuals who were previously denied a US visa, even if holding a valid Mexican visa.
Micronesia	Visa not required	30 days	
Moldova	Visa required		Citizens holding a residence permit or a valid visa issued by one of the member states of the European Union or one of the parties to the Schengen Agreement can apply for an electronic visa.
Monaco	Visa required		
Mongolia	Visa required		
Montenegro	Visa required		Visa is required unless holder of a valid Schengen, Australia, Japan, Canada, New Zealand, Ireland, US or UK visa. Visit for up to 30 days, but not exceeding the expiry of the visa.; Holders of residence permits from a Schengen member state, Australia, Japan, Canada, New Zealand, Ireland, US or UK and AEPC Business Travel Card holders may visit Montenegro for up to 30 days.
Morocco	Visa required		Holders of a visa or residence permit from European Union, United States of America, Australia, Canada, United Kingdom, Japan, Norway, New Zealand and Switzerland valid for 90 days (or 180 days for residence permits) on application, can apply for an eVisa for 30 days. Passport must also be valid for 90 days.
Mozambique	eVisa / Visa on arrival	30 days	
Myanmar	eVisa	28 days	e-Visa holders must arrive via Yangon, Nay Pyi Taw or Mandalay airports or via land border crossings with Thailand — Tachileik, Myawaddy and Kawthaung or India — Rih Khaw Dar and Tamu.; e-Visa is available for tourism only.
Namibia	eVisa	3 months	
Nauru	Visa required		
Nepal	eVisa / Visa on arrival	90 days	
Netherlands	Visa required		
New Zealand	Visa required		Holders of an Australian Permanent Resident Visa or Resident Return Visa may be granted a New Zealand Resident Visa on arrival permitting indefinite stay (pursuant to the Trans-Tasman Travel Arrangement), subject to meeting character requirements and obtaining an Electronic Travel Authority prior to departure.
Nicaragua	Visa required		
Niger	Visa required		
Nigeria	eVisa	30 days	
North Macedonia	Visa required		Visa required unless holding a valid two or multiple entry Schengen visa, or a residence permit issued by an EU member state.
Norway	Visa required		
Oman	Visa required		To obtain an e-Visa, they are required to be either residents or have a valid entry visa for one of the following countries (the United States of America, Canada, Australia, The United Kingdom, Schengen Agreement countries, Japan), or to be residents of one of the countries of The GCC countries and its profession are among the professions that benefit from the resident visa.
Pakistan	eVisa	3 months	
Palau	Free visa on arrival	30 days	
Panama	Visa required		
Papua New Guinea	eVisa	60 days	Visitors may apply for a visa online under the "Tourist - Own Itinerary" category.
Paraguay	Visa required		
Peru	Visa required		
Philippines	eVisa	59 days	Available in single entry (valid for 3 months) or multiple entry (valid for 6 months or 1 year).
Poland	Visa required		
Portugal	Visa required		
Qatar	eVisa		
Romania	Visa required		
Russia	Visa required		
Rwanda	Visa not required	30 days	
Saint Kitts and Nevis	Electronic Travel Authorisation	3 months	
Saint Lucia	Visa required		
Saint Vincent and the Grenadines	Visa not required	3 months	
Samoa	Entry permit on arrival	90 days	
San Marino	Visa required		
São Tomé and Príncipe	eVisa		
Saudi Arabia	Visa required		e-Visa available for all Egyptian passport holders. Known as "Stop Over Visa", is valid for 4 days, and can be obtained when booking with FlyNas or SAUDIA (Saudi Arabian Airlines).; Visa on arrival for holders of a valid Schengen, UK or USA visa and UK, US or EU permanent residents.
Senegal	Visa on arrival	1 month	
Serbia	eVisa	90 days	90 days within any 180-day period. Transfers allowed.
Seychelles	Electronic Border System	3 months	Application can be submitted up to 30 days before travel.; Visitors must upload a reservation confirmation(s) for each visitor's location of stay in Seychelles.; Yellow fever vaccination certificate is required if coming from endemic countries.; Payment of the fee (EUR 10) by credit or debit card.; Valid for one journey only and it expires once exit the country.
Sierra Leone	eVisa / Visa on arrival	3 months / 30 days	
Singapore	Visa required		
Slovakia	Visa required		
Slovenia	Visa required		
Solomon Islands	Visa required		
Somalia	eVisa	30 days	
South Africa	eVisa		e-Visa holders must arrive via O. R. Tambo International Airport.
South Sudan	Visa not required		
Spain	Visa required		
Sri Lanka	ETA / Visa on arrival	30 days	
Sudan	Visa not required (conditional)		Only men between 18 and 49 years require a visa.
Suriname	eVisa	90 days	
Sweden	Visa required		
Switzerland	Visa required		
Syria	eVisa		
Tajikistan	eVisa / Visa on arrival	60 days	Citizens of Egypt can obtain a visa upon arrival for a maximum of 45 days if they arrive at Dushanbe (DYU).
Tanzania	eVisa / Visa on arrival	90 days	
Thailand	eVisa	60 days	Starting from October 8, 2024, the Royal Thai Embassy in Cairo has expanded its online eVisa to include nationals of Egypt, Sudan, Djibouti, and Eritrea
Timor-Leste	Visa on arrival	30 days	
Togo	eVisa	15 days	
Tonga	Visa required		
Trinidad and Tobago	eVisa	90 days	
Tunisia	Visa on arrival (conditional)		Travelers traveling as a group of 10 or more people can obtain a visa on arrival.; Travelers must have a return/onward ticket and a confirmed hotel reservation.
Turkey	Visa required		Visa required unless a valid Schengen, US, UK or Ireland visa or residence permit. They can obtain a 30-day single-entry e-visa, provided that they have and that they travel to Turkey on Turkish Airlines or Egypt Air.; Egyptians under 20 or over 45 years old can obtain e-visa.
Turkmenistan	Visa required		Eligible for a visa on arrival for a maximum stay of 10 days if having a letter of invitation issued by a company registered in Turkmenistan and approved by the Ministry of Foreign Affairs; When transiting between two non-bordering countries, visitors can obtain a Turkmenistan transit visa for a five-day stay. This must be applied for in advance at the Turkmenistan Embassy. Visitors must also submit copies of the visas for the country of entry into Turkmenistan and the country of departure from Turkmenistan. Visa fee is US$20.
Tuvalu	Visa on arrival	1 month	
Uganda	eVisa	3 months	
Ukraine	Visa required		
United Arab Emirates	Visa required		May apply using 'Smart service'.
United Kingdom and Crown dependencies	Visa required		
United States	Visa required		
Uruguay	Visa required		
Uzbekistan	eVisa	30 days	
Vanuatu	eVisa	120 days	
Vatican City	Visa required		The Vatican City is de facto within the Schengen zone.
Venezuela	eVisa		
Vietnam	eVisa	90 days	Phú Quốc - visa exemption for up to 30 days.
Yemen	Visa on arrival	3 months	Yemen introduced an e-Visa system for visitors who meet certain eligibility requirements (group travel of 10 or more people, business trips, and transit etc.).
Zambia	eVisa	90 days	
Zimbabwe	eVisa / Visa on arrival	1 month	

== Dependent, disputed, or restricted territories ==
Unrecognized or partially recognized countries

Territory	Conditions of access	Notes
Abkhazia	Visa required	Tourists from all countries (except Georgia) can visit Abkhazia for a period not exceeding 24 hours as part of an organized tourist group.
Kosovo	Visa required	Visa required unless holder of a valid biometric residence permit issued by one of the Schengen member states or a valid multi-entry Schengen Visa, a holder of a valid Laissez-Passer issued by United Nations Organizations, NATO, OSCE, Council of Europe or European Union a holder of a valid travel documents issued by EU Member and Schengen States, United States of America, Canada, Australia and Japan based on the 1951 Convention on Refugee Status or the 1954 Convention on the Status of Stateless Persons, as well as holders of valid travel documents for foreigners (max. 15 days stay); Holders of diplomatic and service passports issued by Egypt shall be allowed to enter, transit or stay up to 15 days in the territory of the Republic of Kosovo.
Northern Cyprus	Visa not required	
Palestine	Visa not required	Arrival by sea to Gaza Strip not allowed.
Sahrawi Arab Democratic Republic		Undefined visa regime in the Western Sahara controlled territory.
Somaliland	Visa on arrival	30 days for 30 USDs, payable on arrival.
South Ossetia	Visa required	To enter South Ossetia, visitors must have a multiple-entry visa for Russia and register their stay with the Migration Service of the Ministry of Internal Affairs within 3 days.
Taiwan	Visa required	
Transnistria	Visa not required	Registration required after 24h.

Dependent and autonomous territories

Territory	Conditions of access	Notes
China
Hong Kong	Visa not required	90 days
Macau	Visa not required	90 days
Denmark
Faroe Islands	Visa required	
Greenland	Visa required	
France
French Guiana	Visa required	
French Polynesia	Visa required	
(France) French West Indies	Visa required	Includes overseas departments of Guadeloupe and Martinique and overseas collectivities of Saint Barthélemy and Saint Martin.
Mayotte	Visa required	
New Caledonia	Visa required	
Réunion	Visa required	
Saint Pierre and Miquelon	Visa required	
Wallis and Futuna	Visa required	
Netherlands
Aruba	Visa required	
Caribbean Netherlands	Visa required	Includes Bonaire, Sint Eustatius and Saba.
Curaçao	Visa required	
Sint Maarten	Visa required	
New Zealand
Cook Islands	Visa not required	31 days
Niue	Visa not required	30 days
Tokelau	Visa required	
United Kingdom
Akrotiri and Dhekelia	Visa required	
Anguilla	eVisa	Holders of a valid visa issued by the UK, US or Canada do not require a visa.
Bermuda	Visa required	
British Indian Ocean Territory	Special permit required	Special permit required.
British Virgin Islands	Visa required	
Cayman Islands	Visa required	
Falkland Islands	Visa required	
Gibraltar	Visa required	
Montserrat	eVisa	
Pitcairn Islands	Visa not required	14 days visa-free and landing fee US$35 or tax of US$5 if not going ashore.
Ascension Island	Admission refused	From May 2015, the Ascension Island Government does not issue entry visas including e-Visas to nationals of Egypt.
Saint Helena	eVisa	
Tristan da Cunha	Permission required	Permission to land required for 15/30 pounds sterling (yacht/ship passenger) for Tristan da Cunha Island or 20 pounds sterling for Gough Island, Inaccessible Island or Nightingale Islands.
South Georgia and the South Sandwich Islands	Permit required	Pre-arrival permit from the Commissioner required (72 hours/1 month for 110/160 pounds sterling).
Turks and Caicos Islands	Visa required	Holders of a valid visa issued by Canada, United Kingdom or the USA do not required a visa for a maximum stay of 90 days.
United States
American Samoa	Entry permit required	
Guam	Visa required	
Northern Mariana Islands	Visa required	
Puerto Rico	Visa required	
U.S. Virgin Islands	Visa required	
Antarctica and adjacent islands
Special permits required for Bouvet Island, British Antarctic Territory, French Southern and Antarctic Lands, Argentine Antarctica, (Australia) Australian Antarctic Territory, (Antártica Chilena Province) Chilean Antarctic Territory, (Australia) Heard Island and McDonald Islands, (Norway) Peter I Island, (Norway) Queen Maud Land, (New Zealand) Ross Dependency.

== Non-visa restrictions ==
=== Blank passport pages ===
Many countries require a minimum number of blank pages to be available in the passport being presented, typically one or two pages. Endorsement pages, which often appear after the visa pages, are not counted as being valid or available.

=== Vaccination ===
Cover of the new International Certificate of Vaccination issued by the Bureau of Quarantine in the Philippines since 2021

The African countries of Angola, Benin, Burkina Faso, Burundi, Cameroon, Central African Republic, Democratic Republic of the Congo, Republic of the Congo, Côte d'Ivoire, Gabon, Ghana, Guinea-Bissau, Mali, Niger, Sierra Leone and Togo, South Sudan and Uganda, along with French Guiana in South America, require all incoming passengers older than nine months to one year, to have a current International Certificate of Vaccination or Prophylaxis.

Some other countries require vaccination only if the passenger is coming from an infected area or has visited one recently or has transited for 12 hours in those countries: Algeria, Botswana, Cabo Verde, Chad, Djibouti, Egypt, Eswatini, Ethiopia, Gambia, Ghana, Guinea, Lesotho, Libya, Equatorial Guinea, Eritrea, Madagascar, Malawi, Mauritania, Mauritius, Mozambique, Namibia, Nigeria, Papua New Guinea, Seychelles, Somalia, South Africa, Sudan, Tunisia, Uganda, Tanzania, Zambia and Zimbabwe.

=== Passport validity length ===
Very few countries, such as Paraguay, just require a valid passport on arrival.

However many countries and groupings now require only an identity card – especially from their neighbours. Other countries may have special bilateral arrangements that depart from the generality of their passport validity length policies to shorten the period of passport validity required for each other's citizens or even accept passports that have already expired (but not been cancelled).

Some countries, such as Japan, Ireland and the United Kingdom, require a passport valid throughout the period of the intended stay.

In the absence of specific bilateral agreements, countries requiring passports to be valid for at least 6 more months on arrival include Afghanistan, Algeria, Anguilla, Bahrain, Bhutan, Botswana, British Virgin Islands, Brunei, Cambodia, Cameroon, Cape Verde, Cayman Islands, Central African Republic, Chad, Comoros, Costa Rica, Côte d'Ivoire, Curaçao, Ecuador, Egypt, El Salvador, Equatorial Guinea, Fiji, Gabon, Guinea Bissau, Guyana, Haiti, India, Indonesia, Iran, Iraq, Israel, Jordan, Kenya, Kiribati, Kuwait, Laos, Madagascar, Malaysia, Marshall Islands, Mongolia, Myanmar, Namibia, Nepal, Nicaragua, Nigeria, Oman, Palau, Papua New Guinea, Peru, Philippines, Qatar, Rwanda, Samoa, Saudi Arabia, Singapore, Solomon Islands, Somalia, Sri Lanka, Sudan, Suriname, Tanzania, Thailand, Timor-Leste, Tokelau, Tonga, Turkey, Tuvalu, Uganda, United Arab Emirates, Vanuatu, Venezuela, and Vietnam.

Countries requiring passports valid for at least 4 months on arrival include Micronesia and Zambia.

Countries requiring passports with a validity of at least 3 months beyond the date of intended departure include Azerbaijan, Bosnia and Herzegovina, Honduras, Montenegro, Nauru, Moldova and New Zealand. Similarly, the EEA countries of Iceland, Liechtenstein, Norway, all European Union countries (except Ireland) together with Switzerland also require 3 months validity beyond the date of the bearer's intended departure unless the bearer is an EEA or Swiss national.

Countries requiring passports valid for at least 3 months on arrival include Albania, North Macedonia, Panama, and Senegal.

Bermuda requires passports to be valid for at least 45 days upon entry.

Countries that require a passport validity of at least one month beyond the date of intended departure include Eritrea, Hong Kong, Lebanon, Macau, the Maldives and South Africa.

==== Maximum passport age ====
Countries of the Schengen area require non-EU passports to be less than 10 years old upon entry.

=== Criminal record ===
Some countries, including Australia, Canada, Fiji, New Zealand and the United States, routinely deny entry to non-citizens who have a criminal record, while others impose restrictions depending on the type of conviction and the length of the sentence.

=== Persona non grata ===
The government of a country can declare a diplomat persona non grata, banning them from entering the country or expelling them if they have already entered. In non-diplomatic use, the authorities of a country may also declare a foreigner persona non grata permanently or temporarily, usually because of unlawful activity.

=== Israeli stamps ===
Kuwait, Lebanon, Libya, and Yemen do not allow entry to people with passport stamps from Israel or whose passports have either a used or an unused Israeli visa, or where there is evidence of previous travel to Israel such as entry or exit stamps from neighbouring border posts in transit countries such as Jordan and Egypt.

To circumvent this Arab League boycott of Israel, the Israeli immigration services have now mostly ceased to stamp foreign nationals' passports on either entry to or exit from Israel (unless the entry is for some work-related purposes). Since 15 January 2013, Israel no longer stamps foreign passports at Ben Gurion Airport. Passports are still (as of 22 June 2017) stamped at Erez when passing into and out of Gaza.

Iran refuses admission to holders of passports containing an Israeli visa or stamp that is less than 12 months old.

=== Biometrics ===
Several countries mandate that all travellers, or all foreign travellers, be fingerprinted on arrival and will refuse admission to or even arrest travellers who refuse to comply. In some countries, such as the United States, this may apply even to transit passengers who merely wish to change planes rather than go landside.

Fingerprinting countries/regions include Afghanistan, Argentina, Brunei, Cambodia, China, Ethiopia, Ghana, Guinea, India, Japan, Kenya (both fingerprints and a photo are taken), Malaysia upon entry and departure, Mongolia, Saudi Arabia, the Schengen Area, Singapore, South Korea, Taiwan, Thailand, Uganda, the United Arab Emirates and the United States.

Many countries also require a photo be taken of people entering the country. The United States, which does not fully implement exit control formalities at its land frontiers (although long mandated by its own legislation), intends to implement facial recognition for passengers departing from international airports to identify people who overstay their visa.

Together with fingerprint and face recognition, iris scanning is one of three biometric identification technologies internationally standardised since 2006 by the International Civil Aviation Organization (ICAO) for use in e-passports and the United Arab Emirates conducts iris scanning on visitors who need to apply for a visa. The United States Department of Homeland Security has announced plans to greatly increase the biometric data it collects at US borders. In 2018, Singapore began trials of iris scanning at three land and maritime immigration checkpoints.

== See also ==
- Visa policy of Egypt
- Egyptian passport
