= Visa policy of Egypt =

Policy on permits required to enter Egypt

Visitors to Egypt must obtain a visa from one of the Egyptian diplomatic missions unless they are citizens from one of the visa-exempt countries or citizens who may obtain either a visa on arrival or an e-Visa.

Visitors must hold passports that are valid for at least 6 months from the date of arrival.

== Visa policy map ==
Visa policy of Egypt Egypt Visa not required (6 months) Visa not required (3 months) Visa not required (14 days) Visa on arrival / eVisa Visa on arrival eVisa Visa required Authorized visa required

== Visa exemption ==
Citizens of the following countries and territories may visit Egypt without a visa for the following period:

6 months

- Bahrain
- Kuwait
- Oman
- Qatar
- Saudi Arabia
- United Arab Emirates

3 months

- Hong Kong
- Jordan^{#}
- Macau

14 days

- Malaysia

_{# - Must hold a normal 5-year passport that does not contain a stamp from the "Jordanian Registration Office" on the reverse side cover of the passport on page 60. Holders of "T-series" passports are not eligible for visa exemption, and must obtain a visa before entering Egypt. (Note: Male nationals aged between 19 and 39 who hold "T-series" passports must also obtain prior approval before entering Egypt.)}

- In addition, holders of a United Nations passport may enter Egypt without a visa for up to 90 days.
- In addition, holders of an Interpol passport may enter Egypt without a visa for up to 90 days.

=== Conditional visa exemption ===
In addition, citizens of the following countries in certain age groups and genders may also enter Egypt without a visa for the following period:

Indefinite period

- Palestine^{7}

6 months

- Libya^{1 2}
- South Sudan^{1 3}
- Yemen^{5}

3 months

- Afghanistan^{4}
- Algeria^{6}
- Morocco^{6}
- Tunisia^{6}

30 days

- Lebanon^{4}

_{1 - Visa exemption for female nationals.}
_{2 - Visa exemption for male nationals aged below 18 or above 45 years old.}
_{3 - Visa exemption for male nationals aged below 16 or above 50 years old.}
_{4 - Visa exemption for all nationals aged below 16 or above 50 years old.}
_{5 - Visa exemption for all nationals aged below 16 years old.}
_{6 - Visa exemption for all nationals aged below 14 years old.}
_{7 - Visa exemption for holders of VIP passports.}

=== Sinai Visa-free Program ===
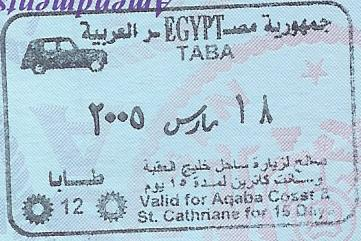
Sinai 15-day permission stamp

According to the Egyptian Consulate General in the United Kingdom, citizens of all European Union member states, the United Kingdom and the United States may enter Egypt without a visa for a maximum of 15 days as a free entry permission stamp will be granted upon arrival if they are travelling to Sharm El Sheikh, Dahab, Nuweiba and Taba resorts only without leaving them.

According to Timatic, citizens of all countries may enter Egypt without a visa at Sharm el-Sheikh, Saint Catherine or Taba airports, for a maximum stay of 15 days. This does not apply to citizens of the following countries and territories: Afghanistan, Algeria, Angola, Bangladesh, Benin, Bosnia and Herzegovina, Botswana, Burkina Faso, Burundi, Cameroon, Cape Verde, Central African Republic, Chad, Comoros, Congo, DR Congo, Djibouti, Equatorial Guinea, Eritrea, Eswatini, Ethiopia, Gabon, Gambia, Ghana, Guinea-Bissau, India, Indonesia, Iran, Iraq, Ivory Coast, Kenya, Lebanon, Lesotho, Liberia, Madagascar, Malawi, Mali, Mauritania, Mauritius, Mongolia, Morocco, Mozambique, Myanmar, Namibia, Niger, Nigeria, Pakistan, Philippines, Rwanda, Senegal, Sierra Leone, Somalia, Sri Lanka, Saint Kitts and Nevis, Sudan, Tanzania, Thailand, Togo, Tunisia, Turkey, Turkmenistan, Uganda, Vietnam, Yemen, Zambia and Zimbabwe.

=== Other visa exemption ===
Furthermore, visa exemption also applies to citizens of the following countries under limited circumstances:

- Lebanon - if travelling to Alexandria and South Sinai; and if arriving at Borg El Arab Airport, Hurghada Airport or Sharm el Sheikh Airport on a charter flight.
- Libya - for male nationals who are husbands or children of female Egyptians; for all nationals who hold an "Investment Authority approval" for those entering Egypt for business; and for Libyan students who hold an accreditation certificate or valid Egyptian University ID card for the current academic year.
- Palestine - for male nationals in transit to the Gaza Strip via Rafah Border Crossing if the border crossing at Rafah is confirmed to be open; for male nationals who hold an official invitation issued to participants of international and regional conferences; and for male nationals who hold an "Investment Authority approval" for those entering Egypt for business related to companies or projects in Egypt.
- Yemen - for nationals who are husbands, wives or children of Egyptians; and for nationals entering Egypt for medical reasons, provided they hold original supporting documents issued by an accredited Egyptian government hospital and are arriving directly from Yemen.

Citizens of Algeria, Djibouti, Iraq, Sudan, Syria, Tunisia and Yemen who are employed by the Arab league may enter Egypt without a visa.

If citizens of Algeria, Morocco and Tunisia are travelling as part of an organised tourist group that consists of at least 2 people and hold a signed guarantee letter from a travel agency, they may enter Egypt without a visa.

A visa exemption also applies to sons and daughters born to an Egyptian father, to an Egyptian mother if born after 25 July 2004, and to wives of Egyptian nationals (except nationals of Afghanistan, Iran, Iraq, Israel, Morocco, and Syria). To qualify for these visa exemptions, a copy of a birth certificate, passport or national ID card of the relative must be presented to prove the relationship.

=== Non-ordinary passports ===
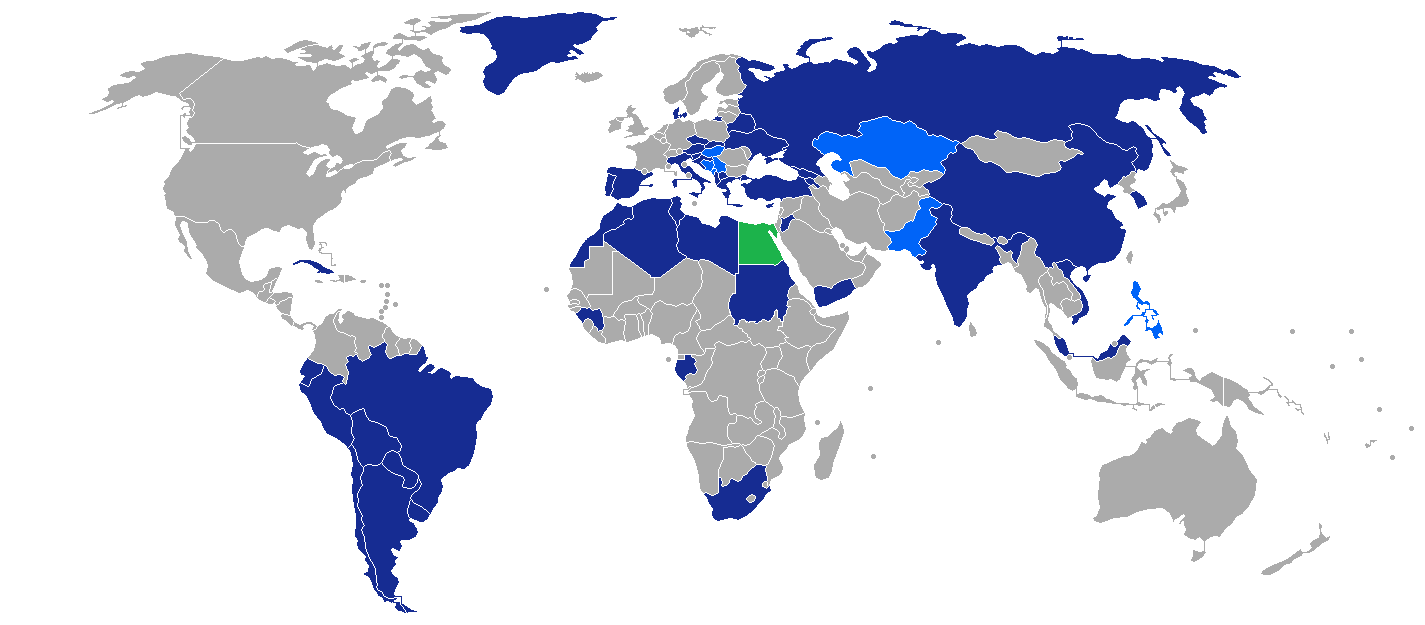
Visa policy of Egypt for holders of diplomatic or official and service category passports Egypt Visa not required for diplomatic and official/service category passports Visa not required for diplomatic passports

Holders of the following diplomatic, official, service or special passports may enter Egypt without a visa:

- Albania^{D S}
- Algeria^{D O S}
- Angola^{D S Sp}
- Argentina^{D O S Sp}
- Armenia^{D}
- Austria^{D S}
- Azerbaijan^{D S}
- Belarus^{D O}
- Bolivia^{D O S}
- Bosnia and Herzegovina^{D S}
- Brazil^{D O}
- Bulgaria^{D O}
- Burundi^{D S Sp}
- Chile^{D O}
- China^{D S}
- Colombia^{D O S}
- Croatia^{D S}
- Cuba^{D O S Sp}
- Cyprus^{D S}
- Czech Republic^{D S}
- Denmark^{D S}
- Djibouti^{D S}
- Ecuador^{D O Sp}
- Gabon^{D S}
- Georgia^{D S}
- Greece^{D}
- Guatemala^{D O}
- Guinea^{D S}
- Hungary^{D}
- India^{D O}
- Indonesia^{D S}
- Italy^{D S}
- Jordan^{D S Sp}
- Kazakhstan^{D}
- Lithuania^{D}
- Libya^{D O S Sp}
- Malaysia^{D O}
- Malta^{D}
- Montenegro^{D S}
- Morocco^{D O S Sp}
- North Macedonia^{D O}
- Pakistan^{D}
- Palestine^{VIP}
- Paraguay^{D O Sp}
- Peru^{D O Sp}
- Philippines^{D}
- Portugal^{D Sp}
- Romania^{D S}
- Russia^{D S}
- Serbia^{D}
- Singapore^{D}
- Slovakia^{D S}
- Slovenia^{D O}
- South Africa^{D O}
- South Korea^{D O}
- South Sudan* ^{D Sp}
- Spain^{D O S}
- Sudan* ^{D O S Sp}
- Tunisia^{D O S Sp}
- Turkey^{D S Sp}
- Ukraine^{D S}
- Uruguay^{D O}
- Venezuela^{D S}
- Vietnam^{D}
- Yemen^{D S Sp}
- Zambia^{D}

_{* - Not visa-exempt, but may obtain a visa on arrival.}
_{D - Diplomatic passports}
_{O - Official passports}
_{S - Service passports}
_{Sp - Special passports}
_{VIP - VIP passports}

== Visa on arrival ==
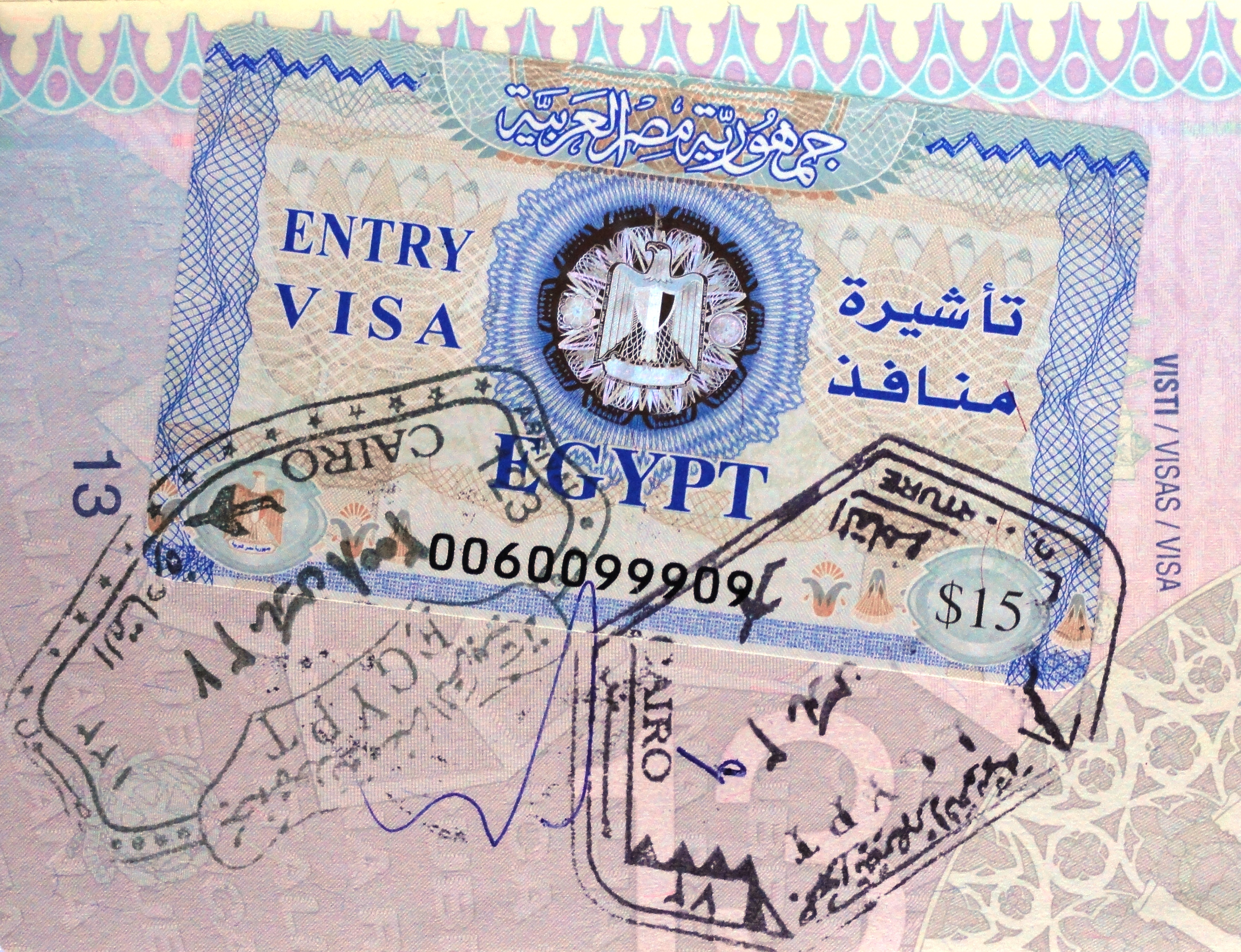
Egyptian visa on arrival

According to Timatic, citizens of the following countries may obtain a visa on arrival for 30 days, provided the purpose of their visit is for tourism only:

- All European Union member states

- Albania
- Andorra
- Antigua and Barbuda
- Argentina
- Armenia
- Australia
- Azerbaijan
- Bahamas
- Barbados
- Belarus
- Belize
- Benin
- Bhutan
- Bolivia
- Brazil
- Brunei
- Canada
- Cambodia
- Chile
- China
- Colombia
- Costa Rica
- Cuba
- Dominica
- Dominican Republic
- Ecuador
- El Salvador
- Fiji
- Georgia
- Grenada
- Guatemala
- Guinea
- Guyana
- Haiti
- Honduras
- Iceland
- Jamaica
- Japan
- Kiribati
- Laos
- Liechtenstein
- Maldives
- Marshall Islands
- Mexico
- Micronesia
- Moldova
- Monaco
- Mongolia
- Montenegro
- Nauru
- Nepal
- New Zealand
- Nicaragua
- North Korea
- North Macedonia
- Norway
- Palau
- Panama
- Papua New Guinea
- Paraguay
- Peru
- Russia
- Saint Lucia
- Saint Vincent and the Grenadines
- Samoa
- San Marino
- São Tomé and Príncipe
- Serbia
- Seychelles
- Singapore
- Solomon Islands
- South Africa
- South Korea
- South Sudan
- Suriname
- Switzerland
- Taiwan
- Timor-Leste
- Tonga
- Trinidad and Tobago
- Turkey^{1}
- Tuvalu
- Ukraine
- United Kingdom (Note: Including all types of British passports.)
- United States
- Uruguay
- Vanuatu
- Vatican City
- Venezuela
- Vietnam

_{1 - Citizens of Turkey who were born in Egypt are not eligible for a visa on arrival. This does not apply when arriving at Sharm El Sheikh (SSH) or Saint Catherine (SKV).}

=== Conditional visa on arrival ===
According to Timatic, travelers with a valid and used visas issued by any Schengen Area member state, Australia, Canada, Japan, New Zealand, the United Kingdom or the United States, or a residence permit issued by any GCC member state, any Schengen Area member state, Australia, Canada, Japan, New Zealand, the United Kingdom or the United States are eligible for a visa on arrival for a maximum of 30 days. The residence permit must be valid for at least 6 months from the arrival date. They must have a confirmed return ticket and sufficient funds to cover their stay. This does not apply to maids, servants and workers. However, citizens of Afghanistan, Ethiopia, Iran, Israel, Mali, Niger, Palestine, Sudan and Syria can not obtain a visa on arrival.

Citizens of Iraq with a valid and used multiple visa issued by any Schengen Area member state, Australia, Canada, Japan, New Zealand, the United Kingdom or the United States may obtain a visa on arrival for a maximum of 1 month. They must have a confirmed return ticket, hotel reservation confirmation and sufficient funds to cover their stay. This does not apply to maids, servants and workers.

Citizens of Yemen with a valid and used multiple visa issued by any GCC member state, any Schengen Area member state or the United States may obtain a visa on arrival. This does not apply to maids, servants and workers.

Citizens of Iraq who are younger than 16 years or older than 60 years may obtain a visa on arrival for a maximum of 1 month.

Citizens of India, Pakistan and Turkey who travel as tourists arriving on a direct flight at Sharm El Sheikh (SSH) or Saint Catherine (SKV) may obtain a visa upon arrival for a maximum of 15 days. They must have a return/onward ticket, confirmed hotel accommodation and at least USD 2,000 - cash or a visa credit card.

Citizens of Algeria, Libya, Morocco and Tunisia who are husbands or wives of a GCC national may obtain a visa on arrival for a maximum of 30 days. They must have a marriage certificate and travel with their spouses.

Citizens of Kosovo may obtain a visa on arrival if they have a Letter of Guarantee from a local travel agency.

==== Tour groups ====
Citizens of India may obtain a visa on arrival if they travel as part of an organized tourist group of at least 2 people and hold a signed guarantee letter from an authorized Egyptian travel agency.

Citizens of Bangladesh, India, Indonesia, Myanmar, Pakistan, Philippines, Sri Lanka and Thailand may obtain a visa on arrival if they travel as part of an organized tourist group of at least 15 people and hold a signed guarantee letter from an authorized Egyptian travel agency.

Citizens of Iraq may obtain a visa on arrival for a maximum stay of 2 weeks if they travel as part of an organized tourist group of at least 3 people arranged by an Egyptian certified tourism company.

Citizens of Tunisia may obtain a visa on arrival for a maximum stay of 30 days if they travel as part of an organized tourist group of at least 2 people arranged by an Egyptian certified tourism company.

Citizens of Kyrgyzstan may obtain a visa on arrival for a maximum of 1 month if they have a Letter of Guarantee from a local travel agency.

Citizens of Kosovo and Tajikistan may obtain a visa on arrival if they have a Letter of Guarantee from a local travel agency.

=== Egyptian Consulate General in the UK ===
According to the Egyptian Consulate General in the United Kingdom, citizens of the following countries may obtain a visa on arrival at any of the Egyptian ports of entry:

- All European Union member states

- Australia
- Canada
- Georgia
- Japan
- New Zealand
- North Macedonia
- Norway
- South Korea
- United Kingdom
- United States

== Electronic visa (e-Visa) ==
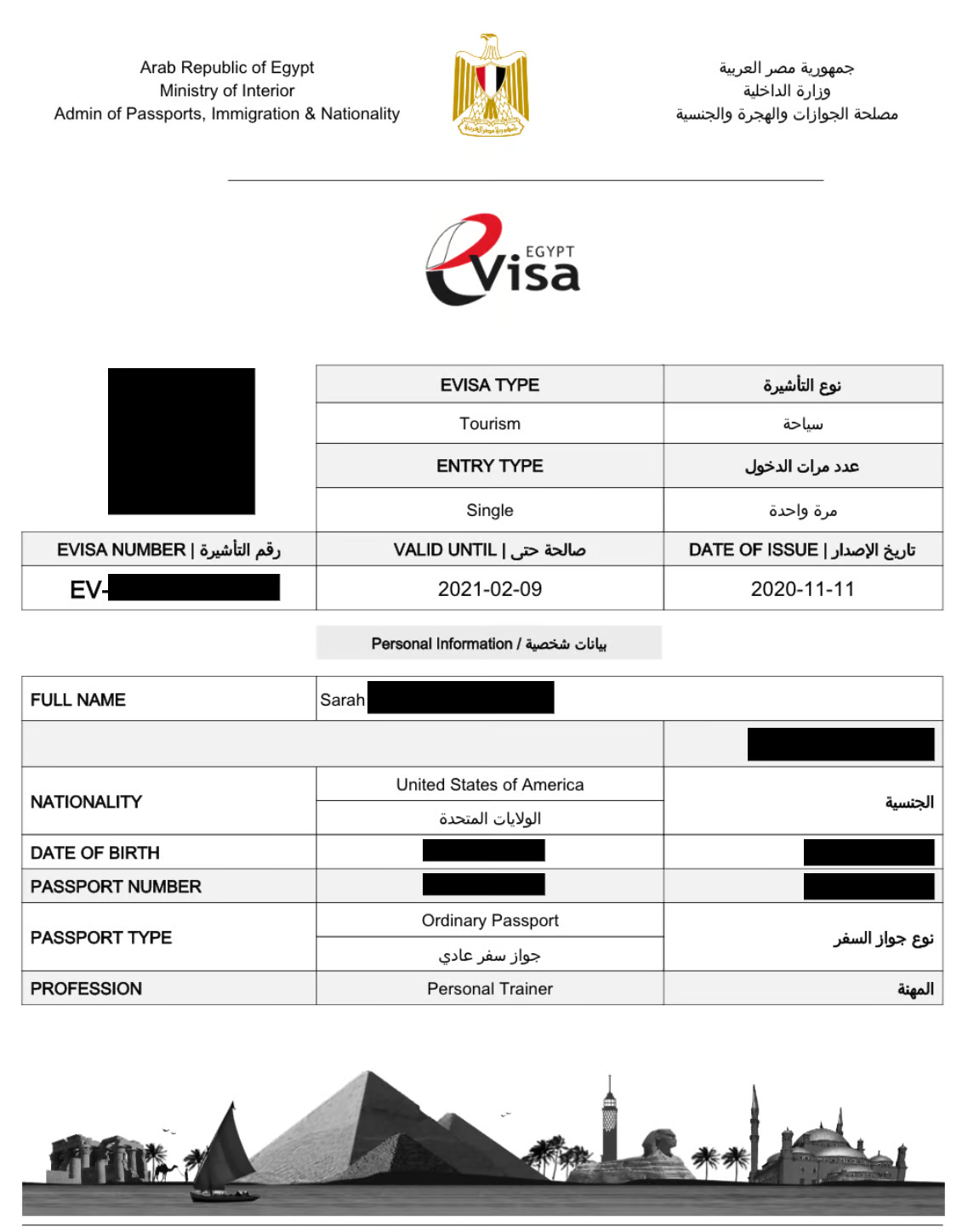
Sample of Egyptian e-Visa

Citizens of the following countries and territories are eligible to apply for business or tourist visas valid for 30 days through the e-Visa system:

- All European Union member states

- Albania
- Argentina
- Armenia
- Australia
- Azerbaijan
- Bahrain
- Belarus
- Bolivia
- Bosnia and Herzegovina
- Brazil
- Canada
- Chile
- China
- Colombia
- Ecuador
- Georgia
- Iceland
- India
- Iraq^{1}
- Japan
- Kosovo
- Kuwait
- Malaysia
- Mexico
- Moldova
- Monaco
- Montenegro
- New Zealand
- North Macedonia
- Norway
- Oman
- Paraguay
- Peru
- Qatar
- Russia
- San Marino
- Saudi Arabia
- Serbia
- Singapore
- South Africa
- South Korea
- Switzerland
- Taiwan
- Ukraine
- United Arab Emirates
- United Kingdom
- United States
- Uruguay
- Vatican City
- Venezuela
- Vietnam

_{1 - Citizens of Iraq traveling as a tourist and who are aged between 16 years and 60 years may obtain an e-Visa.}

== Authorized visa required ==
According to the Embassy of Egypt in the United States, citizens of the following countries and territories must obtain a pre-approval visa:

- Afghanistan
- Ethiopia
- Iran
- Israel
- Mali
- Niger
- Palestine
- Sudan
- Syria

According to Timatic, citizens of the following countries must obtain a pre-entry visa with security approval. This does not apply:

- if they have a residence permit issued by any European Union member state, any GCC member state, Australia, Canada, Japan, New Zealand, the United Kingdom or the United States;

- if they have a valid and used visa issued by any Schengen Area member state, Australia, Canada, Japan, New Zealand, the United Kingdom or the United States;

- if they have a Letter of Guarantee from a local travel agency;

- to wives of Egyptian nationals with a marriage certificate;

- to children of Egyptian mothers born after 25 July 2004 with a birth certificate;

- to children of Egyptian fathers with a birth certificate or an Egyptian national ID card;

- to husbands of a national of Egypt with a marriage certificate and who travel with their spouses.

- Kazakhstan
- Kyrgyzstan
- Tajikistan
- Uzbekistan

In addition, citizens of Kazakhstan, Kyrgyzstan, Tajikistan and Uzbekistan younger than 21 years must be accompanied by a parent.

=== Afghanistan ===
Citizens of Afghanistan must have confirmation that their entry has been approved before departure by the Ministry of Interior, in addition to a visa.

=== Sudan ===
Citizens of Sudan with a visa issued by Egypt on or after 24 September 2024 must obtain a pre arrival security clearance issued by any Egyptian embassy before departure. The visa must state the date and security clearance number. This does not apply when arriving from Sudan with a visa issued in Port Sudan or Wadi Halfa with "known to the Egyptian embassy in Sudan" stated on their visa.

=== Syria ===
Citizens of Syria are allowed to enter if they:

- have a pre-entry visa with security approval;

- have a residence permit issued by Egypt (not including touristic residence). They must not have been outside Egypt for more than 6 months.

=== Yemen ===
Citizens of Yemen above 16 years must obtain a pre-arrival security clearance before departure. The visa must state the date and security clearance number.

This does not apply to passengers with:

- a valid and used multiple visa issued by any GCC member state, any Schengen Area member state or the United States;

- a residence permit issued by any GCC member state, any Schengen Area member state, Australia, Canada, Japan, Jordan, New Zealand, the United Kingdom or the United States. The residence permit must be valid for at least 6 months from the arrival date. They must travel as tourist and must have a confirmed return ticket.

== Admission restrictions ==
=== Pakistan ===
Citizens of Pakistan with a letter issued by the Military Investment Authority of the Libyan Army are not allowed to enter or transit.

=== Palestine ===
Citizens of Palestine with a passport number or ID number that starts with "0/00/000" are not allowed to enter or transit.

== See also ==
- Visa requirements for Egyptian citizens
