= Hisham Ezz Alarab =

Egyptian banker

Hisham Ezz Al-Arab
- Born: 1957 (age 68–69)
- Education: Cairo University
- Occupation: Banker
- Known for: Chairman of the Commercial International Bank (2002–2020)
- Awards: Best CEO in Egypt and Africa (2014)

Hisham Ezz Al-Arab (Arabic: هشام عز العرب; born 1957) is an Egyptian banker. He is the former Chairman and Managing Director of Commercial International Bank (CIB), a position he resigned from in October 2020.

He has held various global leadership positions at banks such as J.P. Morgan Chase and Deutsche Bank. He became CEO and Managing Director of CIB in 2002.

Ezz Al-Arab has received several accolades, including Best CEO in Egypt and Africa from EMEA Finance in 2014, and the Euromoney Award for Excellence for Outstanding Contribution to the Middle East Financial Services Industry in 2016.

He currently serves on the board of Fairfax Africa and is a member of the MasterCard Middle East and Africa Advisory Board. Prior to his time at CIB, he served as an advisor to the Governor of the Central Bank of Egypt for three months.

In August 2023, he was appointed as an advisor to the Governor of the Central Bank of Egypt. He later resigned from that position after returning to his role as Chairman of the Commercial International Bank.

== Career ==
Hisham Ezz Al-Arab began his banking career in Egypt in 1977 after graduating from Cairo University. His early experience paved the way for international leadership roles, including serving as Managing Director for J.P. Morgan and Deutsche Bank in London.

He joined the CIB as Deputy Managing Director in 1999, was appointed to the board in 2001, and became Chairman and Managing Director in 2002. Beyond his role at CIB, he served two terms as Chairman of the Federation of Egyptian Banks (2013–2016 and 2017–2020) and was a member of both the Board of Trustees of the American University in Cairo and the MasterCard Middle East and Africa Regional Advisory Board.

His career has earned him numerous honors, including being named "Best CEO in Africa" in 2014. In 2019, he was recognized by Business Today magazine as a leading figure in the digital transformation of Egypt’s banking sector, and was also commended by the Egyptian Presidency for his efforts in enhancing national healthcare services.
