= CIB Kenya =

Kenyan commercial bank

Coordinates: 01°15′28″S 36°48′08.5″E

Commercial International Bank Kenya Ltd
- Type: Private
- Industry: Financial services
- Founded: 20 June 2017; 9 years ago
- Headquarters: Mezzanine Floor, KAM House, Mwanzi Road, Westlands, Nairobi, Kenya
- Products: 1. Credit Account; 2. Savings Account 3. Debit Cards 4. Credit Cards 5. Mobile & Internet Banking 6. Safe deposits locker 7. Teyari Overdrafts; 8. Investments
- Revenue: ▼Aftertax:KSh365.88 million (US$3.46 million) (2019)
- Total assets: KSh8.65 billion (US$82 million) (2019)
- Website: https://cibke.com/

Commercial International Bank (CIB) Kenya Limited is a commercial bank in Kenya. It is licensed by the Central Bank of Kenya, the country's central bank and national banking regulator.

== Location ==
The headquarters and main branch of the bank are located on the Mezzanine Floor at KAM House, along Mwanzi Road, in Westlands, Nairobi.

== Overview ==
CIB Kenya is a retail banking institution, serving small to medium enterprises, large corporate clients and individuals. The bank was started in 2017, as a greenfield investment, by 31 Kenyan investors. As of December 2019, the bank's total assets were valued at KSh8.65 billion (US$82 million), with shareholders' equity of KSh1.040 billion (US$10 million).

== History ==
CIB Kenya was granted a banking licence by the CBK on 20 June 2017 and began its operations on 1 August 2017.

In December 2019, Commercial International Bank, based in Egypt began the process of seeking regulatory approval in Egypt and Kenya, to acquire a controlling interest in Mayfair Bank.

=== Acquisition ===
On 3 December 2019, it was announced that one of Egypt's top banks, Commercial International Bank (CIB) wanted to acquire Mayfair Bank. In April 2020, after receiving regulatory and shareholder approval from Nairobi and Cairo, CIB paid US$35 million in exchange for 51 percent shareholding in Mayfair Bank. In January 2023, CIB Egypt fully acquired the bank by buying the remaining 49% shares. The bank has since rebranded from Mayfair CIB Bank Kenya Limited to CIB Kenya.

== Shareholding ==
As of June 2017, the bank was locally owned by 31 shareholders, thirteen of them corporate and eighteen individuals.

In April 2020, Commercial International Bank of Egypt bought 51 percent shareholding in Mayfair bank for a consideration of US$35 million. The shareholding in the bank changed as illustrated in the table below.

Shareholding In CIB Bank
Rank	Name of Owner	% Ownership
1	Commercial International Bank	51.00
6	Other Kenyan Corporations	49.00
	Total	100.00

== Branches ==
1. CIB Kenya Headquarters - Kamhouse, 14 Mwanzi Rd, Nairobi, Nairobi
2. Mayfair Center - MAYFAIR Center, Ground Floor, Ralph Bunch Road, Nairobi
3. Nyali Branch - KRISH Plaza, Ground Floor, Links Road, Mombasa
4. Industrial Area Branch - Hi-Tech Granite Industries Building, Enterprise Road, Industrial Area, Nairobi
5. Eldoret Branch - Rupa's Mall, Second Floor, Malaba Road, Eldoret
6. New Upper Hill Branch - Old Mutual Towers, Ground Floor, Upperhill Road, Nairobi
7. Mombasa Nkurumah Road Branch Oriental Building, ground floor, Mombasa CBD, Nkurumah Road, Mombasa

== See also ==
- List of banks in Kenya
- Central Bank of Kenya
- Economy of Kenya
