= Ahmed Abu Ismail =

Egyptian economist and politician (1915–2013)

Minister of Finance
- In office 16 April 1975 – 19 November 1976
- President: Anwar Sadat
- Prime Minister: Mamdouh Salem
- Preceded by: Mohammed Hamdi El Nashar
- Succeeded by: Mahmoud Salah Eldin Hamed

Personal details
- Born: March 1915 Samannud, Sultanate of Egypt
- Died: May 2013 (aged 97–98)
- Resting place: Samannud
- Party: New Wafd Party
- Education: University of Manchester

Ahmed Abu Ismail (1915–2013) was an Egyptian economist and politician, who served as minister of finance in the 1970s.

== Early life and education ==
Ismail was born in Samannud in March 1915. He hailed from a wealthy middle-class family. He attended the University of Manchester and obtained a PhD in transport economics in 1938.

== Career ==
Following his graduation Ismail worked at the University of London and returned to Egypt in 1948. Then he worked at an Egyptian university. He established the college of commerce of Kuwait University in 1968. Ismail supported a liberal economy approach and harshly criticized the inefficiency of the Egyptian public sector.

Although Ismail acted as the leader of opponents of the public economy policy implemented by President Anwar Sadat, he was appointed finance minister on 16 April 1975, replacing Mohammed Hamdi El Nashar in the post. The cabinet was led by Prime Minister Mamdouh Salem.

Ismail adhered to a liberal economic approach, but he was an advocate of the price control and the increased level of subsidies to improve the economy of Egypt when he was in office. Ismail's tenure ended on 19 November 1976 when he was dismissed due to his opposition over the policies imposed by the International Monetary Fund. The Economy Minister Zaki Shafei was also removed from office on the same date due to the same reason. Mohammed Salah Eldeen Hamid became finance minister replacing Ismail in the post. Then Ismail was named as the head of the Far East Bank in Cairo and served at the Parliament as a member of the New Wafd Party.

== Death and legacy ==
Ismail died in May 2013 and was buried in his hometown, Samannud. A district in Samannud was named after him in September 2013.
