= Commercial International Bank =

Egyptian bank

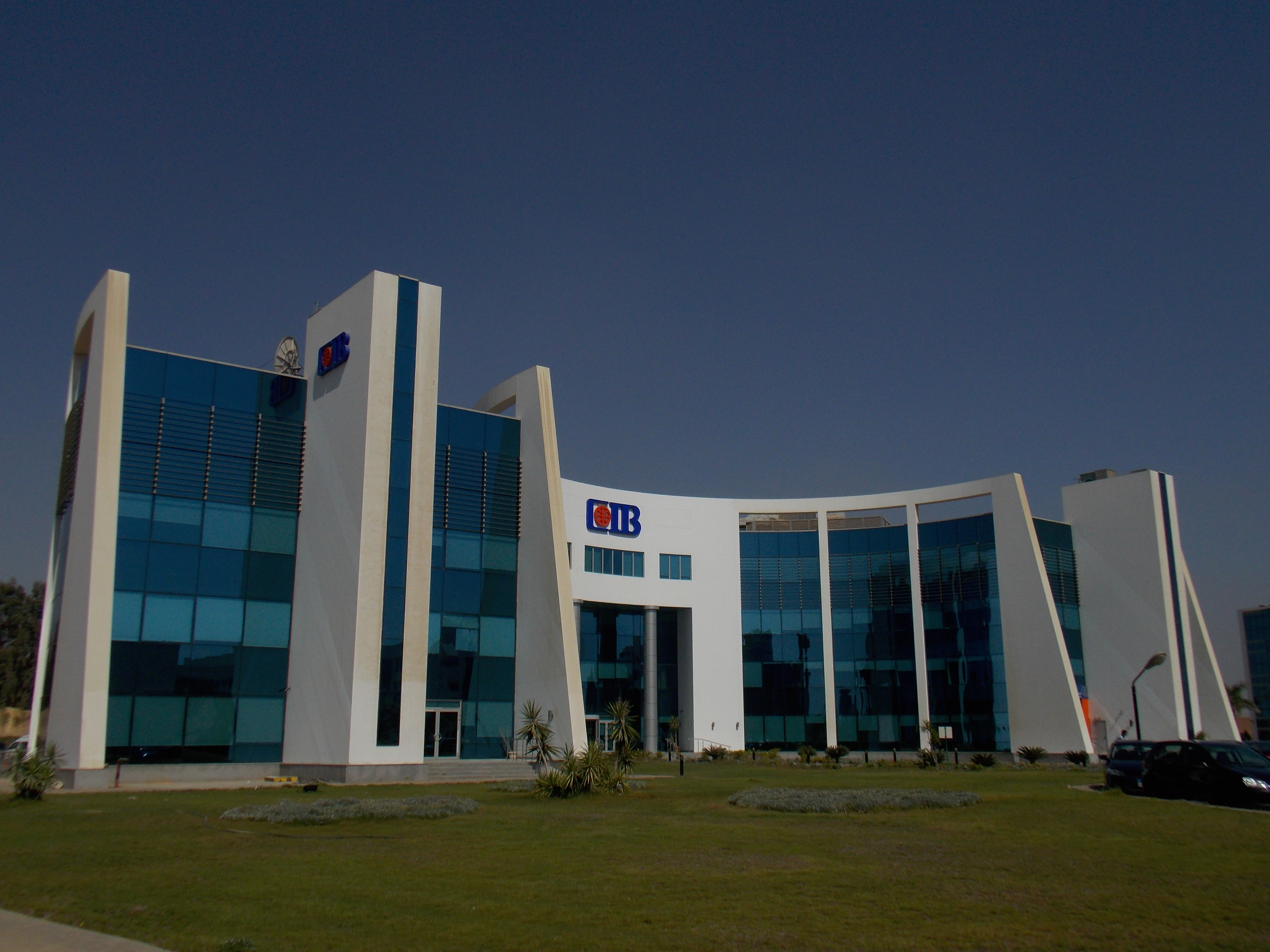
- Smart Village branch
- Native name: البنك التجارى الدولى
- Type: Private bank
- Traded as: EGX: COMI
- ISIN: EGS60121C018
- Industry: Banking and financial services
- Founded: 1975; 51 years ago
- Headquarters: Cairo, Egypt
- Number of locations: 214 (2025)
- Key people: Nevine Sabbour (chair); Hisham Ezz Alarab (chief executive)
- Services: Financing, Retail banking
- Net income: EGP 98,9 billion (2024) (USD 1,8 billions)
- Total assets: EGP 1,02 trillion (2024) (USD 23,4 billions)
- Total equity: EGP 152,6 billion (2024) (USD 2,85 billions)
- Number of employees: 5 983 (2023)
- Subsidiaries: CIB Kenya
- Website: www.cibeg.com

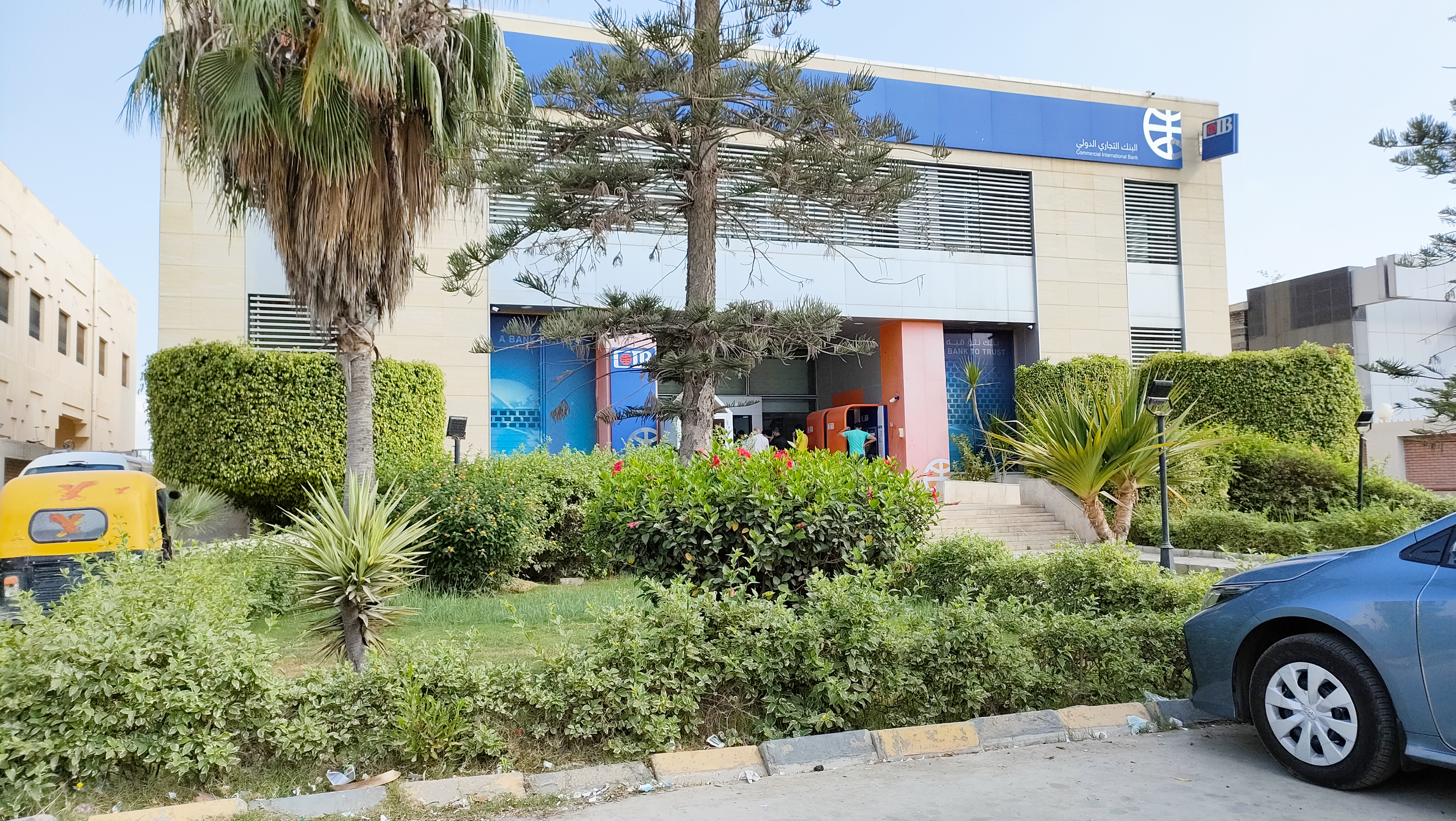
New Borg El Arab city branch.

Commercial International Bank or CIB (Egyptian Arabic: البنك التجارى الدولى) is a major Egyptian bank, between the big five banks. Founded in 1975, it is considered one of the largest banks in the Egyptian private sector.

== History ==
The Commercial International Bank was established in 1975, with joint ownership by National Bank of Egypt (51%) and Chase Manhattan Bank (49%) under the name "Chase National Bank of Egypt".

In 1987, after Chase Bank's decision to sell its share of the shares, the National Bank of Egypt established an increasing in its stake to 99.9%, and the bank's name was changed to "Commercial International Bank – Egypt." The National Bank of Egypt's share continued to decline through several public offerings, to reach 18.7%.

In 2006, a consortium led by Ripplewood Holdings acquired the share of the National Bank of Egypt. In July 2009, Actis purchased a 9.1% stake in Commercial International Bank, thus becoming the largest single shareholder in the bank's capital.

In March 2014, Actis sold part of its stake in the bank amounting to 2.6%. The sale was made through the Egyptian Stock Exchange to a group of several portfolio managers and international investment funds.

In May of the same year, Actis sold its remaining 6.5% stake in the bank's capital to Fairfax Holding Company for Financial Services, and in late 2015 the Commercial International Bank acquired the shares of Citibank – Egypt through the Egyptian Stock Exchange and included all of its branches in its management.

In April 2022 ADQ, one of Abu Dhabi's sovereign funds, acquired a stake in the bank worth $911.457m. The purchase of 340.096 million shares was executed as a block trade.

Hisham Ezz Alarab, chief executive and managing director of the bank from 2002 to 2020, returned as chair in early 2023. In September 2024 the board appointed him chief executive and managing director, succeeding Hussein Abaza, and nominated Nevine Sabbour as non-executive chair, the first woman to hold the position at the bank. In March 2026 the general assembly extended his term as chief executive until March 2029 and approved a new board chaired by Sabbour.

CIB was ranked 28th on Forbes Middle East's 30 Most Valuable Banks 2025 list. It also ranked 45th on Forbes Middle East's Top 100 Listed Companies 2025 list.

== International operations ==
- Kenya: On December 3, 2019, it was announced that Commercial International Bank (CIB) intended to acquire Mayfair Bank. In April 2020, after obtaining approval from regulatory authorities and shareholders in Nairobi and Cairo, CIB paid US$35 million to acquire 51% of Mayfair Bank's share capital. In January 2023, CIB Egypt acquired the remaining 49% of the bank's share capital. Since then, the bank has changed its name to CIB Kenya, succeeding Mayfair CIB Bank Kenya Limited.

== See also ==
- List of largest banks in Africa
- Hisham Ezz Alarab
