= Central Bank of Egypt =

National monetary authority

Central Bank of Egypt البنك المركزي المصري

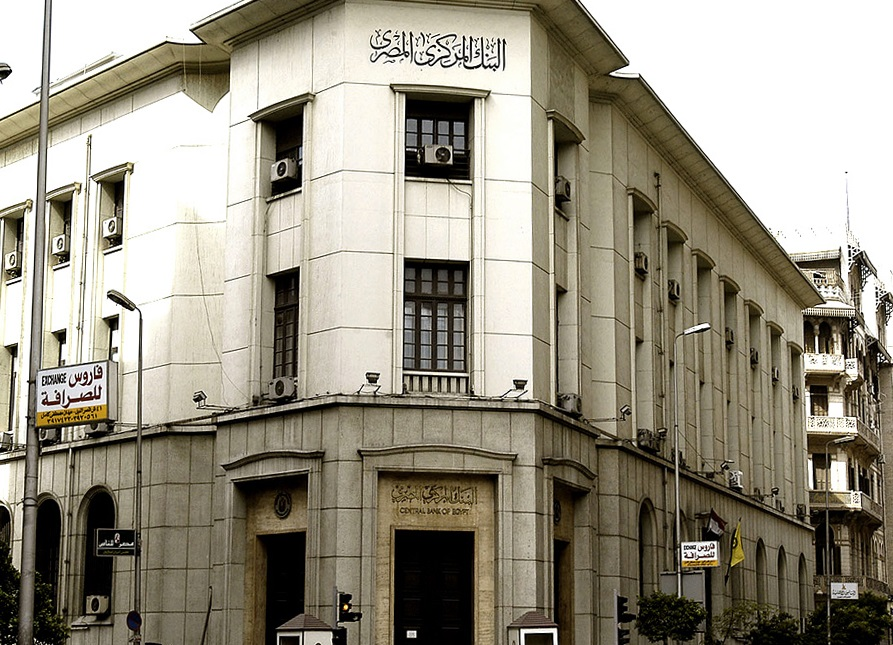
- Central Bank building in Cairo
- Central bank of: Egypt
- Headquarters: Cairo
- Established: January 1961
- Ownership: 100% state ownership
- Governor: Hassan Abdullah
- Currency: Egyptian pound EGP (ISO 4217)
- Reserves: USD 53 billion (May 2026)
- Bank rate: 19.00% (February 2026)
- Preceded by: National Bank of Egypt (until 1960)
- Website: www.cbe.org.eg

The Central Bank of Egypt (CBE; Egyptian Arabic: البنك المركزى المصرى) is the central bank and monetary authority of Egypt.

Regulates banks and the banking system of Egypt; Formulates and implements Egypt's banking policy, monetary policy and credit policy; Issues banknotes; Manages gold and the foreign exchange reserves of Egypt; Regulates and manages Egypt's presence in the foreign exchange market; Supervises the national payments system; As part of this, launched an instant payment system called InstaPay in March 2022; Manages Egypt's public and private external debt.

== History ==
The structural roots of the CBE began with the creation of the National Bank of Egypt as a commercial joint-stock company on June 25, 1898, by British financier Sir Ernest Cassel alongside prominent local partners.

Following the 1952 revolution and a broader push toward "Egyptianization" and the nationalization of strategic corporate assets, the government decided that a commercial entity should no longer wield central banking powers.

In July 1960, Law No. 250 was enacted, decreeing the formal nationalization of the NBE and dividing it into two completely separate entities. Established in January 1961 to inherit the sole authority to issue banknotes, formulate monetary policy, and supervise the domestic banking registry.

In 1967, To eliminate reliance on foreign printing houses, the CBE established its own Banknote Printing House in Giza.

In 2003, the first measures to begin floating the price of the Egyptian pound were implemented.

Law No. 88 of 2003, This unified banking law fortified the CBE’s operational independence, formalizing its core mandate to ensure price stability.

=== 2011 Egyptian Revolution ===
During the 2011 Revolution, the country’s financial system had to abruptly pivot from a period of robust post-reform growth to emergency crisis management. Despite severe macroeconomic shocks, the banking sector demonstrated remarkable resilience, banks across Egypt closed their doors for roughly a week (and faced intermittent closures throughout February) as street protests paralyzed the economy. When banks finally reopened on February 6, 2011, the CBE imposed strict daily withdrawal limits to prevent a run on banks. Individuals were capped at pulling out EGP 50,000 and $10,000 in foreign currency per day. Despite closures, an estimated $1.5 billion of foreign investment left Egyptian Treasury bills in the earliest wave of the crisis, as international investors and local wealthy individuals sought to de-risk. Following the Egyptian Revolution, HSBC was accused of helping to enrich high-ranking Egyptian political and economic officials, who are now at the center of corruption investigations.

=== Post-Revolution measures ===
In November 2016, under the governorship of Tarek Hassan Amer, the CBE took the historic and critical structural step of fully floating the Egyptian Pound to stabilize foreign exchange reserves and rebalance the macroeconomy.

Law No. 194 of 2020, This sweeping regulatory upgrade replaced older legislation to bring the Egyptian banking ecosystem in line with modern international standards. It expanded the CBE’s oversight to cover digital banking, fintech innovations and payment systems.

=== 2023-2024 financial crisis ===
On March 6, 2024, the Central Bank of Egypt decided to reduce the exchange rate of the Egyptian pound against the US dollar for the first time in more than 14 months, following an exceptional meeting that raised interest rates by about 600 basis points. The Central Bank confirmed in a statement that, within the framework of targeting inflation rates, it would work to allow the exchange rate to be determined according to market mechanisms.

== Currency ==
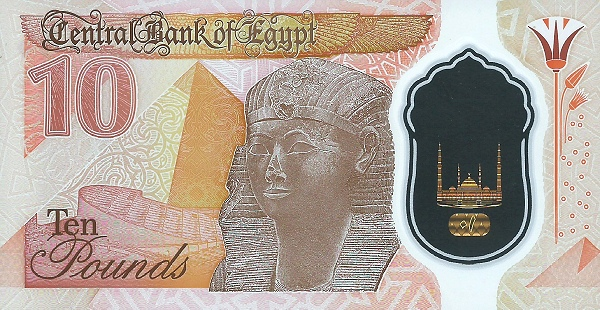
First polymer banknote (2022)

Since the trading of gold and silver coins in Egypt and until 1834, there was no one unit of currency to unify the country. In 1834, a decree was realised stating the forging of an Egyptian currency based on the two metals (gold and silver). In accordance with said decree, the minting of a currency in the shape of gold and silver Riyals began. In 1836, the Egyptian pound was first introduced and it became open for public use.

== List of governors ==
Following is a list of the Governors of the Central Bank of Egypt:

N.°	Name	Mandat
1	Abd El-Hakim El Refaie	1961–1964
2	Ahmed Zendo	1964–1967
3	Ahmed Nazmy	1967–1971
(2)	Ahmed Zendo	1971–1976
4	Mohamed Abd El Fatah Ibrahim	1976–1982
5	Mohamed Shalaby	1982–1985
6	Ali Mohamed Negm	1985–1986
7	Mahmoud Salah Eldin Hamed	1986–1993
8	Ismail Hassan Mohamed	1993–2001
9	Mahmoud Abou El Oyoun	2001–2003
10	Farouk El Okdah	2003–2013
11	Hisham Ramez	2013–2015
12	Tarek Hassan Amer	2015–2022
13	Hassan Abdullah	Since 2022

== See also ==
- List of central banks of Africa
- Egyptian Exchange
- Economy of Egypt
- Banking in Egypt
