= Egyptian nationality law =

Egyptian Nationality Law

Parliament of Egypt
- Long title: Law No. 26 of 1975 Concerning Egyptian Nationality, as amended
- Territorial extent: Egypt
- Enacted by: Government of Egypt
- Administered by: Ministry of Interior
- Status: Current legislation

Egyptian Nationality Law is regulated by the Constitution of Egypt, as amended; the Egyptian nationality law, and its revisions; and various international agreements to which the country is a signatory. These laws determine who is, or is eligible to be, a national of Egypt. The legal means to acquire nationality, formal legal membership in a nation, differ from the domestic relationship of rights and obligations between a national and the nation, known as citizenship.

The Egyptian nationality is typically obtained under the principle of jus soli, i.e. by birth in Egypt, or jus sanguinis, born to parents with Egyptian nationality. It can be granted to persons with an affiliation to the country, or to a permanent resident who has lived in the country for a given period of time through naturalization.

== Acquisition of nationality ==
Nationality can be acquired in Egypt at birth or later in life through naturalization.

=== By birth ===
Those who acquire nationality at birth include:

- Children born anywhere who have at least one parent who is an Egyptian national by birth; or
- Abandoned children or orphans discovered in the territory whose parents are unknown.

=== By naturalization ===
Naturalization can be granted to persons who have resided in the territory for a sufficient period of time to confirm they understand the Arabic language, customs and traditions of the society. General provisions are that applicants have good character and conduct; have no criminal convictions; have good mental and physical health; can economically be self-sufficient; and have resided in the country for ten years. Egyptian nationality law does not reference whether adoptees can acquire nationality. Besides foreigners meeting the criteria, other persons who may be naturalized include:

- The legal wife of an Egyptian national after two years of marriage, and upon making a declaration of a desire to acquire Egyptian nationality to the Minister of the Interior;
- Persons born in Egypt who have nationality from a Muslim country or one in which the majority of people speak Arabic and who have resided in Egypt for one year;
- Foreign persons born in Egypt who have been a regular resident of Egypt at the time of majority can naturalize with the residency period waived if they apply within one year of reaching majority;
- Persons born in Egypt whose father was also born in Egypt, and has Arab or Muslim roots, after five years residency;
- Minor children can be automatically naturalized when their parent acquires nationality;
- Persons who have performed exceptional services to the nation, including as the head of a religious sect, can be naturalized without other requirements; or
- Persons who have invested specified monies toward the development of the nation may naturalize after a five-year residency.

== Loss of nationality ==
Egyptian nationals can renounce their nationality pending approval by the state. To reacquire nationality that has been lost whether through renunciation or denaturalization, five years must have lapsed since its termination. Nationals may be denaturalized in Egypt for having dual nationality or serving in the military of another state without government authorization; performing actions against state interests; having been a Zionist; failure to perform military obligations; performing actions indicating one is a national of another state; committing serious crimes, disloyal acts, or crimes against the state or state security; residing abroad without authorization; or for fraud, misrepresentation, or concealment in a naturalization petition. Some of the provisions for denaturalization depend upon the length of time one has been naturalized and others have neither a time limit, nor make distinction between native born or naturalized individuals in loss of nationality.

== Dual nationality ==
Dual nationality is typically allowed in Egypt since 2004, as long as authorization is given by the government; however, neither the president nor prime minister, or their immediate family members can hold multiple nationalities. Various court rulings in specific cases have also barred parliamentarians from having dual nationality. Typically, if someone acquires dual nationality and does not have governmental permission, there is no automatic consequence; however, if the Cabinet of Egypt has rendered a decision on the case, the affected individual is legally denaturalized.

== History ==
For thousands of years, Egyptian identity in the Nile Valley was defined by culture, religion, local community, and allegiance to ruling dynasties, rather than by any formal legal nationality.

=== Ottoman period (1517–1914) ===
From 1517, the inhabitants were subjects of the Egyptian province of the Ottomans. Within the Ottoman Empire, for six centuries, there was an internal organization that defined government functions for subjects by balancing religious and communal ties, weighing aptitudes and occupations without a centralized national ideology. Ottoman subjecthood was strongly tied to religion and non-Muslims, if they were ahl al-Kitāb (People of the Book), meaning Jewish, Christian, or Zoroastrian, could benefit from being subjects by agreeing to pay a tax to the sultan. Under a pact known as zimma, in exchange for paying taxes, the sultan allowed these subjects freedom of religion and guaranteed their lives, property, and rights with an understanding that they were legally entitled to less status than Muslim subjects. The pact was agreed to by the leaders of the confessional community, who managed the adherents and their internal organization under the religious law of their community.

By the eighteenth century a political organization, known as the millet, managed the affairs of their respective religious communities and developed into the protégé system (Turkish: beratlılar, protected persons). Signing treaties with European powers, from the 1673 signing of a Capitulation with France, the Ottoman Empire granted France control of certain Ottoman Christians, Austria control of some Ottoman Roman Catholics, most favoured nation status to British and Dutch traders, as well as specific rights to the Republic of Venice and Russian Empire. Under the terms of these treaties, foreign powers could recruit Ottoman subjects to serve their needs as commercial agents, consuls, or interpreters, and extend to these protégés diplomatic immunity from prosecution and privileges of trade, including lowered customs tariffs. Over time, abuses of the system led to a virtual monopoly of foreign trade by protégés, clandestine sales of letters patent (Turkish: berats), and demands from foreign powers for protection to extend from individuals to entire communities. The influence on Ottoman subjects by European powers changed the perception of these minority groups in the empire, meaning that they were increasingly seen not as Ottoman subjects, but as resident aliens.

In 1798, France and Britain's conflicts during the Napoleonic Wars extended into Egypt. France occupied the territory until 1801, when the French were defeated and Britain set about assisting the Ottoman Empire in regaining its sovereignty. To curb the disruptive effects of Europeans in the empire, from 1806, the Ottoman government began sending communiques to the foreign embassies demanding compliance with the terms of their agreements. Failing to achieve success diplomatically, in 1839, the Ottoman government issued the Edict of Gülhane, in an effort to end bribery and corruption, and to create fair tax schemes and institutions to protect the basic rights of Ottoman subjects. The Ottoman Reform Edict of 1856 (Turkish: Islâhat Fermânı) categorized subjects by whether they were Muslim or non-Muslim, granting different civil statuses to each. In 1863, new regulations upon protégés restricted the privileges they received in the empire and clarifying who were thereafter considered to be Ottoman subjects and who were foreigners.

The Khedivate of Egypt was established by 1867, and to further define subjects of the Ottoman Empire, new nationality legislation was passed in 1869 (tâbiiyet-i osmaniye kanunnamesi, Ottoman Nationality Law). (Note: Will Hanley, a history professor at Florida State University, notes that the etymology of tâbiiyet includes associations with allegiance, nationality, and subjecthood, or an affiliation to a sovereign, but does not translate as citizenship.) The law specified terms for the acquisition and loss of who was within the sovereignty of the empire, rather than the domestic obligations and rights of citizenship. It described who was a subject, owing allegiance, and made provisions for wives, children, emigrants and immigrants. Under its terms, children derived nationality from their fathers, foreigners born in the territory could acquire nationality at majority, and foreigners born elsewhere could obtain nationality after five years residency within the imperial realm. Specific provisions included that foundlings discovered within the territory; stateless persons living in the empire; Muslim women, who despite the ban on such marriages, had married Persian men and the children of such a union; unregistered persons who had not been counted in the Ottoman census, either because no census was taken or their births were unregistered, were all considered to be Ottoman. Foreign women acquired Ottoman nationality through marriage, but could return to their original nationality upon the death of their spouse. Nationality could also be granted based on special contribution or service to the nation. Dual nationality was permitted, but was discouraged, as the government could choose not to recognize naturalization of an Ottoman subject by another state.

In 1901 Egypt promulgated its first nationality code, defining the acquisition of Egyptian nationality in its jurisdiction, though still recognizing that they were Ottoman subjects. (Note: Hanley notes the 1900 law was forgotten as into the 1920s in Egypt, acquisition of nationality was based on Ottoman statutes.) Amendments made to the Ottoman Nationality Law in 1909 included conveyance of nationality to adoptees and to children born on ships in Ottoman waters. It also introduced in Article 6 that foreign wives who acquired nationality by marriage could repatriate to their original nationality upon termination of the marriage; in Article 7 that foreign wives could only naturalize with their foreign husbands; and in Article 19 that women derived the nationality of their husband upon marriage. (Note: Hanley notes that these amendments were influenced by and were very similar to provisions in the 1894 Persian nationality law.) From 1909, Ottoman subjects were allowed to denaturalize with permission of the authorities, but doing so would result in banishment from the empire. Ottoman Rule ended on 5 November 1914 and a British Protectorate was established over Egypt on 18 December 1914.

=== British period (1914–1922) ===
Under the terms of the 1919 Treaty of Versailles, Article 102, former Ottoman (ethnic Turkish) subjects resident in Egypt were denaturalized by Turkey and automatically acquired Egyptian nationality unless they were absent from the territory on 18 December 1914. Articles 103–105 provided that Turkish subjects who began residing after that date could apply for naturalization, if they were of legal age and of similar ethnicity to the majority population in Egypt. Naturalization of a man automatically covered his wife and minor children. British protectorates, in 1914, were considered to be foreign territories lacking an internal government. When Britain extended this status over a territory, it took responsibility for both internal and external administration, including defense and foreign relations. Indigenous persons who were born in a protectorate were known as British Protected Persons (BPP) and were not entitled to be British nationals. BPPs had no right of return to the United Kingdom and were unable to exercise rights of citizenship; however, they could be issued a passport and could access diplomatic services when traveling abroad. Persons born in a British protectorate to a father who was a British national derived their nationality from their parent. Legally protectorate status was extended over Egypt by the British in 1914 and withdrawn in 1922; however, the British crown exercised extraterritorial jurisdiction in Egypt until it was terminated by an Order in Council on 14 October 1949.

=== Post-independence (1922–1958) ===
Egypt declared its independence on 15 March 1922 and passed its first nationality law as an independent state on 26 May 1926. Under its terms, nationality derived from a father who was Egyptian or from a foreign father who was born in Egypt, and was either Muslim or from a country which spoke Arabic, if the child was born in Egypt. Under Article 11, it allowed anyone born in Egypt to opt for Egyptian nationality by decree within one year of attaining majority, if any other nationality was repudiated. Foreign women unconditionally acquired nationality from a native-born Egyptian spouse, and by choice upon his naturalization. If an Egyptian woman married a foreigner, which resulted in her acquiring foreign nationality, she lost her Egyptian nationality. The law allowed naturalization former Ottoman subjects, providing they lived in Egypt by 5 November 1914, but required a five-year residency for former Ottomans who had not lived in Egypt previous to that date. The law was revised on 27 February 1929 (Law 19) adding a provision that a child could derive their mother's nationality if the father was unknown. Many of the Mutamassirun community were still denied application for the Egyptian citizenship.

The 1929 Nationality Law remained in place until it was repealed with the passage of Law 160 on 18 September 1950. Conditions for attaining nationality did not change overmuch, but did include provisions to reduce statelessness, which had become a growing concern. Creation of the Israel in 1948 had led to large numbers of stateless Palestinians taking refuge in neighboring countries. To address the issue, children born anywhere to an Egyptian mother and a father who was stateless or had no known nationality were granted nationality. The process was automatic upon notification of the Minister of the Interior, within one year of the child attaining majority. The 1950 statute also provided for the first time that marriage did not automatically change a woman's nationality. Under its provisions, she had to consent to acquiring her husband's status, wait two years after the marriage, and obtain the approval of the Ministry of the Interior to naturalize. Following the Egyptian revolution of 1952 and the Independence of the Sudan in 1956, a new nationality statute, Law 391 was promulgated on 22 November 1956. The law was passed at the culmination of the Suez Crisis and invasion of Egypt by British, French and Israeli forces and introduced Zionism as a reason for denying acquisition of nationality or denaturalization in Egypt for the first time. The day after the law passed, the Minister of Religious Affairs ordered the expulsion of the Egyptian Jewish Community as enemies of the state.

=== Pan-Arab period (1958–1971) ===
On 1 February 1958, Egyptian President Gamal Abdel Nasser and Syrian President Shukri al-Quwatli announced the formation of the United Arab Republic. A referendum held on 21 February in both countries confirmed the creation of the new state. Under the Constitution of 1958, anyone who held Syrian or Egyptian nationality was considered a national of the United Arab Republic. Weighing the Egyptian Law 391 and Syrian nationality laws of 1953, as amended to 1957, the State Council conferred the nationality of the United Arab Republic upon anyone who had nationality under those statutes. Law 82 of 22 June 1958 adopted the same conditions for obtaining nationality as in the 1956 Egyptian statute, substituting nationality of the United Arab Republic for Egyptian nationality throughout the text. However, prior to the dissolution of the union on 28 September 1961, Egyptian women married to Syrian men did not lose their nationality and were able to pass their nationality on to their children. Syria withdrew from the union, declaring its independence in 1961, but Egypt continued using the name United Arab Republic until 2 September 1971. The Nationality Law of the United Arab Republic remained in effect except that children born to an Egyptian national and her Syrian husband were not considered to be Egyptian after 1961.

=== Republic of Egypt (1971–present) ===
The Constitution of 1971, for the newly renamed state of the Arab Republic of Egypt, provided that nationality was to be regulated by statute. It also had guarantees for gender equality in cultural, economic and socio-political spheres. On that basis, women's rights groups in Egypt began pressuring the government to amend nationality laws. On 29 May 1975, new legislation, Law 26, was adopted concerning Egyptian nationality. While retaining the provisions for derivative nationality in the 1958 law, the statute additionally stipulated that Egyptians were inhabitants of Egypt prior to 5 November 1914 who still lived in the country in 1975 and did not have other nationality; those who became nationals under Law 391 of 1956; and persons who were nationals of the United Arab Republic. Though it allowed foreign wives to naturalize after two years of marriage to an Egyptian, there were no provisions allowing a foreign husband to obtain nationality through his wife. In 1976, a legal challenge (case 3136) was brought in the Alexandria Administrative Court by a woman challenging the legality of the 1975 Nationality Law which denied her son Egyptian nationality because she was married to a Jordanian. The court upheld the law and denied the son Egyptian nationality.

In 1997, having reached the age of majority, the son of the plaintiff in Case 3136 of 1976, appealed the ruling on his nationality. The following year women's groups began pressing for reform of the 1975 law. In 1999, the State Court Cases Authority presented an argument on behalf of the nation requesting that the Constitutional Court reject the appeal. In turn, the Constitutional Court requested evaluation of the constitutionality of the 1975 law by the State Commissioner's Authority. The Authority's report concluded that Articles 2 and 3, which limited a child's ability to derive nationality from its mother were unconstitutional. The Supreme Constitutional Court concurred that the articles were unconstitutional in their 2004 ruling. Based on that ruling, Law 154 was passed on 14 July 2004 amending the 1975 Nationality Law. The amendment granted children born to Egyptian mothers equal provisions to derive nationality from either parent, and was made effective retroactively. However, there was a one-year limit from the date of passage of the law on automatically deriving maternal nationality. After that year, until further change was made in 2014, only children born after 2004 could automatically derive nationality maternally without the agreement of the Minister of the Interior.

In 2009, the Supreme Administrative Court changed legal interpretation which denied identity documents and birth registration to persons who were not members of one of the state recognized religions, i.e. Christianity, Islam, or Judaism. As a result of the ruling, the Ministry of the Interior issued a decree modifying the 1994 law for Implementing Statutes of Egypt's Civil Status to allow religious affiliation to be left blank in official documents. When the Egyptian revolution of 2011 ended, protests by women activists caused the Ministry of the Interior to issue a decree allowing children of Egyptian mothers and Palestinian fathers to derive nationality maternally. A new Constitution was adopted in 2012, stating in Article 32 that nationality was a legally protected right. The Constitution was amended in 2014 and retained language that nationality derives from statute, but added a provision that nationality is a right to children of Egyptian parents, closing the loophole in the 2004 amendment which made maternal derivation discretionary. On 16 July 2018 the Egyptian House of Representatives approved a bill to amend the nationality law, which was ratified on 15 August 2018 by President Abdel Fattah el-Sisi. The amendment granted that foreign nationals who deposited E£7 million would be eligible to apply for naturalization after a five-year residency period.
