= Qatawi family =

Egyptian Sephardic Jewish family

Qatawi
- 1891–1957
Musiri family	Soares family
- Leader: Qatawi
- President: Qatawi

The Qatawi family (also spelled Qatawwi, Catawi, or Cattaui) (Arabic:عائلة قطاوي) is an Egyptian Sephardic Jewish family. A number of its members engaged in political and economic activity in Egypt in the late nineteenth century until the first half of the twentieth century, and its origins go back to Qatta village, north of Cairo.

== Members ==
=== Elisha Haider Qatawi ===
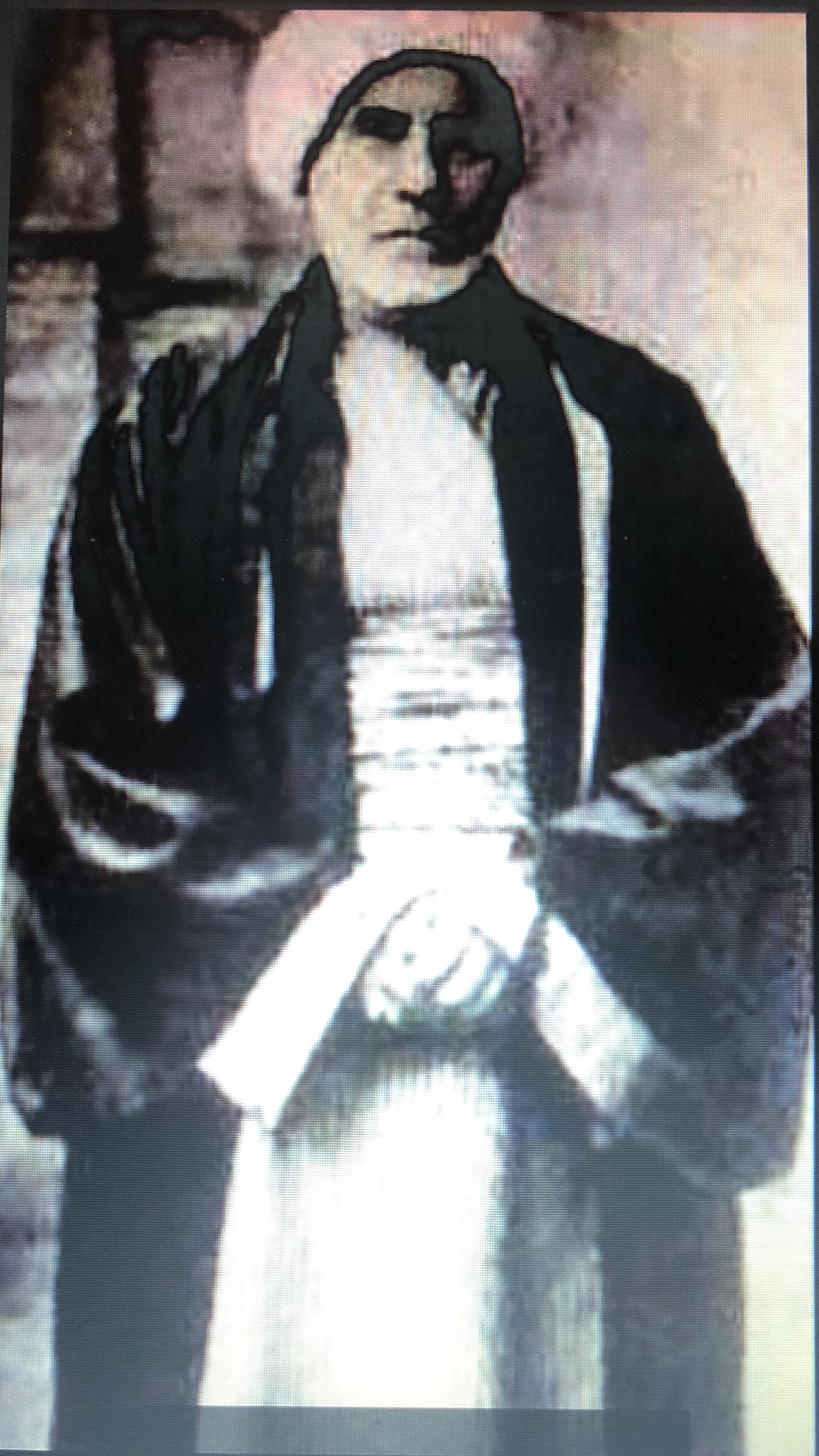
Jacob Qatawi, patriarch and founder of the Qatawi Banking Dynasty

The exodus of Elisha Haider Qatawi to Cairo took place in the late eighteenth century, when his son Jacob (1801–1883) obtained privileges from the government to carry out commercial and financial activities. He is given the title "BK." He also held the title of Baron of the Austro-Hungarian Empire of which the family held citizenship. He was entrusted with the position of overseer of the treasury during the reign of Khedive Abbas I (1848–1854), and he retained this position during the rule of Governor Saeed and Khedive Ismail, and in his last days he assumed the presidency of the Jewish community in Cairo, which was called the Israelite sect.

=== Moses Qatawi ===
After his death, his son Moses Qatawi (1850–1924) succeeded him in 1883 as head of the sect, and he was chosen as a member of the Egyptian Parliament, and he was also granted the title of Pasha. Moses was a prominent financier and banker. He managed a number of companies and contributed to financing railway projects in Upper Egypt and East Delta and public transportation projects in Cairo in cooperation with the Sawaris and families.

=== Joseph Aslan Qatawi ===
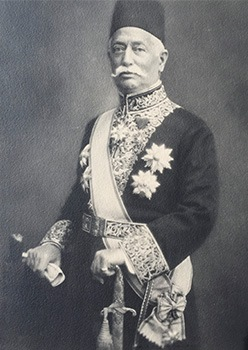
Joseph Aslan Qatawi

After the death of Moses, the leadership of the sect passed to his nephew, Joseph Aslan Qatawi (1861–1942), who studied engineering in Paris and upon his return worked as an employee in the Ministry of Public Works. Then he traveled to Italy to study the origins of sugar manufacturing. He returned to Egypt to establish a sugar factory, and was chosen as a member of many advisory councils for industrial and financial institutions. In 1920, he participated in cooperation with Talaat Harb and Joseph Cicurel in establishing Banque Misr.

In 1915, Joseph was a member of the Egyptian delegation seeking to negotiate with Britain to gain independence for Egypt. In 1922, he was chosen as a member of the committee that was entrusted with the task of drafting a new Egyptian constitution in the wake of the 1919 Egyptian revolution and the British declaration granting Egypt its formal independence in 1922.

Joseph Aslan Qatawi served as Minister of Finance in 1924 and then Minister of Transportation in 1925. He was elected in 1923 as a member of the House of Representatives for the Kom Ombo district. He was also a member of the Senate from 1927 to 1939, when he retired due to poor health.

In 1935, he published a study in French defending On Khedive Ismail's economic policy.

He married into the wealthy Jewish Sawaris family, and his wife was a maid of honor to Queen Nazli.

=== Aslan and Rene Qatawi ===
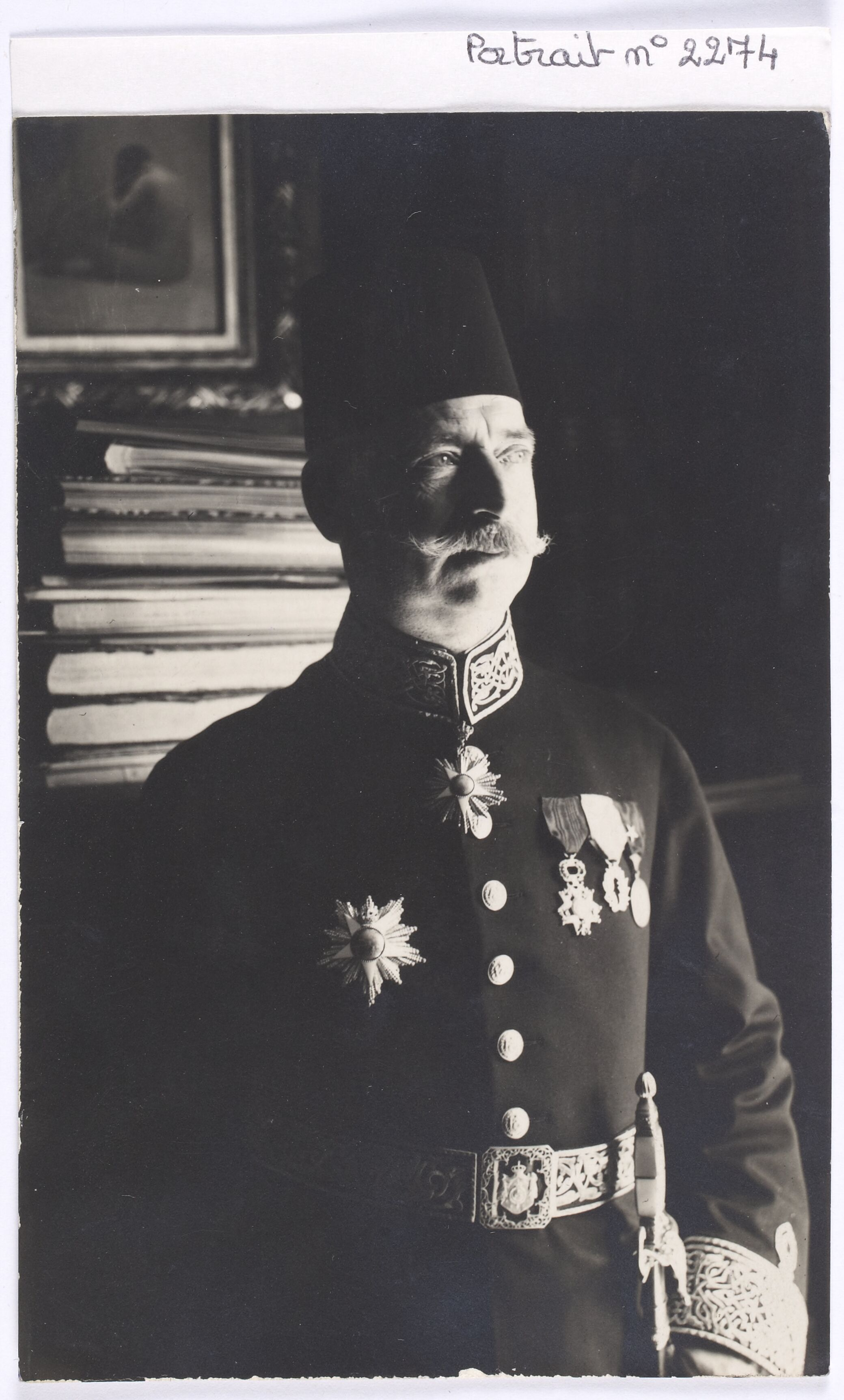
René Qatawi in 1925

After the death of Joseph Aslan, his son Aslan was elected to occupy his father's seat in the Senate in 1938. He also worked as Secretary-General of the Royal Properties Authority of the Ministry of Finance, a representative of the Egyptian government in the Suez Canal Company, and a representative of the government in the National Bank of Egypt.

Joseph Alsan's second son, René, was chosen in 1943 as president of the Cairo Sephardic Leadership Council. He was a member of Parliament and managed several economic projects. Between 1931 and 1936, he published three volumes that constitute a history of the period of Muhammad Ali's rule. Youssef Qatawi was one of the founders of the Egyptian Society for Jewish Historical Studies.

In 1957, the brothers René and Aslan left Egypt and settled in Europe.

=== George Qatawi ===
The last prominent figure in the Qatawi family, George Qatawi, has primarily literary interests, as he published several studies on English and French literature, and he also wrote poetry in French. He embraced the Catholic Christian doctrine along with many Egyptian Sephardic Jewish intellectuals who abandoned Judaism.

=== Other members ===
French writer Edmond Jabes became a member of the family through his marriage to Arlette Cohen, the granddaughter of Moses Qatawi.
