= Cicurel family =

Sephardic Jewish family in Egypt

The Cicurels were a prominent Sephardic Jewish family in Egypt throughout the first half of the 20th century, best known for the elite department store chain bearing their family name. Moreno Cicurel, the family patriarch, emigrated from Turkey in the latter half of the 19th century. Other members of the family remained in Smyrne until the beginning of 20th century and then migrated to the USA (San Francisco) and to France. Moreno Cicurel established Les Grands Magasins Cicurel at the turn of the century. His three sons helped grow the business to prosperity and acclaim following his death.

The Cicurels were initially able to survive the growing anti-Semitism in Egypt following the creation of Israel. But ultimately, the government sequestered the business and forced its sale. The family left Egypt and dispersed across Europe and South America. Today the stores remain, but only as a shell, devoid of their former grandeur.

The article is concerned only with the descendants of Moreno Cicurel who were born or active in Egypt.

== Arrival in Egypt ==
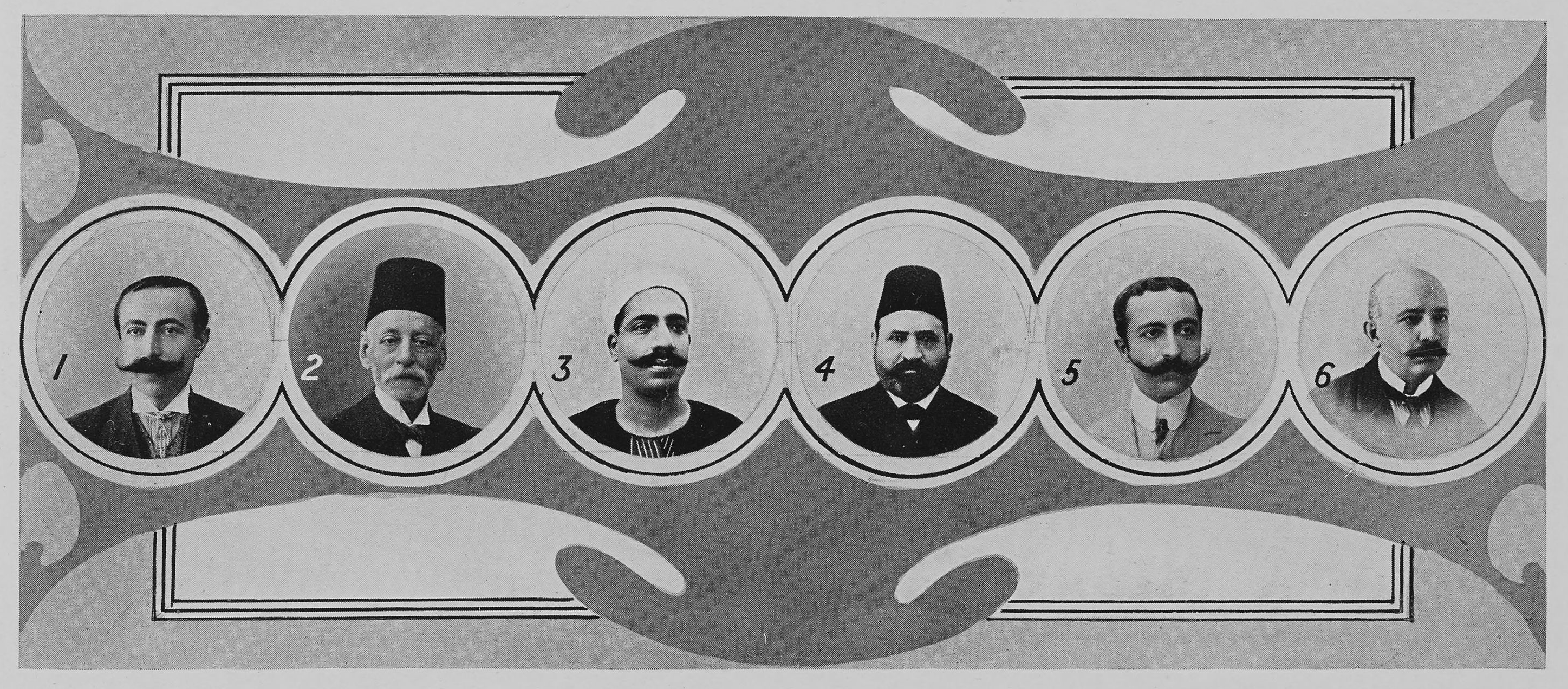
Businessmen in Egypt in 1909. Number 4 is Moreno Cicurel

Moreno Cicurel was born in 1864 in Smyrna (now İzmir, Turkey). In his 20s he emigrated to Egypt with his wife and young son, Salomon. Starting as a tailor's assistant in Cairo's bustling Mousky district, Moreno quickly found work in the Hannaux department stores, where he became manager of a department. In 1887, he set out on his own by purchasing a small store,"Au Petit Bazaar," from his employer. His second son, Joseph, was born that same year. His third son, Salvator, was born seven years later in 1894.

[The Encyclopedia of Jews in the Islamic World states that Moreno was born in 1820, emigrated to Egypt in 1840, purchased "Au Petit Bazar" in 1882 and founded "Les Grands Magasins Cicurel" in 1910. They mistakenly state he was an Italian citizen.]

== Establishment of Les Grands Magasins Cicurel ==
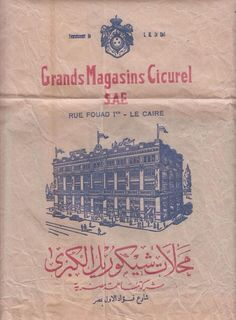
Grands Magasins Cicurel

Shortly after the turn of the century, Moreno Cicurel opened a new large department store named Les Grands Magasins Cicurel in downtown Cairo near Opera Square, a prestigious area of chic hotels and consulates. Later, two additional branches, as well as a thrift store chain called Oreco, were opened in Alexandria and Ismailia.

The Cairo store "encompassed two buildings, each taking up a city block and looming four stories high ... Once inside, shoppers could view an array of goods in departments that supplied the king of Egypt as well as other elite and more middle class families."

The Cicurel store developed into Egypt's largest and most fashionable department store chain: Les Grands Magasins Cicurel et Oreco. Cicurel specialized in ready-to-wear men's and women's clothes, shoes, housewares, and notions, much of which were imported from Europe. It had an excellent reputation for high quality and was a purveyor to the royal palace during the reigns of Kings Fu'ad and Faruq. The Oreco branch of the firm consisted of thrift stores serving the lower middle classes. The Cicurel stores had a foreign cultural character due to their largely non-citizen Jewish staff, their exclusive and largely imported merchandise, and the use of French by employees and customers on the shop floors. Nonetheless, the Cicurel family regarded themselves as Egyptians and saw their business activities as contributing to the Egyptian national economy. The products they purveyed in their department stores and the cultural ambience they promoted were widely considered by the elite and upper-middle strata to be proper accoutrements of modern culture completely compatible with nationalist ideals and aspirations as they were commonly understood until the mid-1950s.

== The Second Generation ==
After the death of Moreno in 1919, his sons – Salomon, Joseph and Salvator – continued to run the family business empire and each gained prominence in his own right.

=== Salomon (1881 – 1927) ===
After Moreno's death, his eldest son Salomon took over as the senior partner in Les Grands Magasins Cicurel. By 1927, Salomon, 46, had amassed significant personal wealth and lived in a sprawling villa on the Nile in the exclusive section of Giza (now part of Cairo University) until his brutal murder. His death made headlines.

Shortly after midnight March 4, he was fatally stabbed eight times while his wife, Elvire Toriel, was reportedly chloroformed in the bed beside him. Two of the couple's children, Rosie, 10, and Raymond, 6, slept with their governess in another area of the home, as did the servants, and remained safe. (Their daughter Lili was away in France.) Jewelry was stolen. Because of the high standing of the Cicurels in Egyptian society, the case was given top priority and personally headed by the Director General of Public Security Mahmoud Fahmi Keissy Pasha, who would later become Egypt's Minister of Interior. Due to the Cicurels' position and the fact that jewelry was stolen, hysteria broke out among Cairo's wealthy, who feared a wave of robbery-murders.

Within a day, four men were arrested for the crime. Two men were Italian: the family's chauffeur, who had vowed revenge after being dismissed, and a friend. The third was Greek, a driver for another Cairo family. The fourth was a local Jew. At the time, Egypt still functioned under the Capitulations system, by which foreign nationals were tried under the laws of their own states. And, because neither Italy nor Greece had death penalties, only the Egyptian Jew faced the gallows for the crime, which he was said to have masterminded. This legal absurdity and its direct linkage to the question of sovereignty quickly became the subject of a heated political debate in both the Egyptian press and the country's new parliament.

Salomon's funeral procession clogged traffic in Cairo streets as it inched toward the ancient palm-lined Jewish Bassatine cemetery. Many businesses and trading houses, the majority Jewish owned, closed out of respect. After the murder, Salomon's family moved to France and were no longer involved in the management of Cicurel stores.

Solomon's wife left with their children for France and never returned to live in Egypt. His daughter, Lily, married Pierre Mendès-France, who later became the Prime Minister of France. His son, Raymond, was a musician/philosopher until his death in 2008.

=== Joseph Cicurel (1887-1939) ===
Apart from managing the family's business after Solomon's death, Joseph, Moreno's second son and a strong believer in Egyptian nationalism, served on the executive committee of the Egyptian Chamber of Commerce and the Commission on Commerce and Industry. "Both these institutions promoted the economic and industrial development of Egypt and served as incubators for the doctrine of economic nationalism popularized by Talaat Harb Pasha."

In 1920 Joseph joined forces with Talaat Harb and prominent Jewish businessman Yusuf 'Aslan Qattawi to create Egypt's first national bank, Banque Misr. He was one of the 10 founding directors who boldly aimed to break the foreign stranglehold over Egypt's economy, namely that of the British, French and Belgian, who were shareholders of Egypt's banks and financial institutions. Banque Misr was widely acclaimed as the embodiment of Egyptian economic nationalism.

Joseph Cicurel participated personally in several of the ventures of Banque Misr throughout the 1920s and expanded the family's participation in the broader sectors of economy. He settled his family in Paris, where he represented Banque Misr and continued to handle European suppliers for the Cicurel stores. He died in Nottingham in 1939 on a buying mission for the family business. His family returned to Egypt at the start of WWII.

Joseph had four children, Clément (b. 1912), René (b. 1916), Guy (b. 1917) and Sylvain (b. 1927). The three eldest participated in the family business when they became of age. René also competed in two automobile rallies, winning both the Rally of Solloum and the Cairo-Tripoli-Cairo Rally in the early 1950s.

=== Salvator Cicurel (1894–1976) ===
Following the deaths of Salomon and Joseph, Salvator Cicurel managed the business single-handedly before being joined by Joseph's three eldest sons. Thereafter, he led the management of the Cicurel enterprise until it was sequestered. (See "Demise of Les Grands Magasins Cicurel" below for more detail.)

Salvator was Egypt's national fencing champion. As captain, he led the Egyptian fencing team to win a silver medal at the 1928 Summer Olympic Games in Amsterdam. He was also chair of the Jewish Maccabee Sports Club.

In addition to his many affiliations in sports and Egyptian commerce, Salvator was a founding member of the Friends of the Hebrew University in Jerusalem and served on the Cairo Sephardic Jewish Community Council for more than 20 years. In 1946, Salvator succeeded René Qattawi as President of the council, a position he held until he left Egypt in 1956 for Milan. The following year he moved to Lausanne, Switzerland and remained there until his death in 1976.

== Demise of Les Grands Magasins Cicurel ==
Les Grands Magasins Cicurel remained prominent in Egyptian culture for over 40 years. During the 1948 Arab-Israeli War, the store was spared from being placed under government administration, as it was a preferred shopping destination of the royal family. This was not the case of many other Jewish owned businesses. Nevertheless, while its businesses benefited from the family's connections in high society, the store could not escape the rising tensions surfacing in the political landscape.

Shortly after the establishment of the State of Israel in 1948, the Cicurel store in downtown Cairo was damaged in the 1948 Cairo bombings, likely the work of the Muslim Brotherhood. A memorandum submitted to the Ministry of Commerce in 1948 described the Cicurel firm as "one of the pillars of our economic independence." The damage was repaired and the stores reopened.

Neglecting the signs of changing times, the Cicurels remained in Egypt as tension against the Jews continued to mount. On January 26, 1952, during the Cairo Fire, an enraged mob burned and looted, unabated, large parts of modern Cairo. The Cicurel store was targeted due to the perceived European character of the store and its largely Jewish staff. After being burnt down, the store was rebuilt.

The Cicurels' situation, as well as that of most Egyptian Jews, deteriorated in 1956 during the Suez Crisis and war. This time Les Grands Magasins Cicurel was placed under governmental control, along with all other Jewish businesses. The family was forced to sell its majority holding for a pittance to a new group headed by Muslim Egyptians. The store was nationalized in 1961. Today, the old department stores continue to operate bearing their original name, but little else resembles the original stores. The spaces are "dismantled and rented out by the meter to wholesalers to display low-priced merchandise and electric appliances."

== Leaving Egypt ==
By the end of 1956, when Les Grands Magasins Cicurel was placed under government control, the majority of the family had left Egypt. Only René, Joseph's second son, remained in Cairo in a futile attempt to liberate some family assets. However, he gave up on that impossible task in 1959 and left for Switzerland first, then in 1962 for Paris, France.

The rest of the family born in Egypt dispersed across Europe and South America:

Clément (1918-1978), moved to Italy, where he worked with the department stores La Rinascente and Marks & Spencer. The children of Clément, Joseph Alain (1945-2011) and Marianne (1940- ) settled in Paris (France). René (1916-2005) also settled in France and his son Paul Joseph (1945- ) moved to Canada and then the United States, where he built a successful career in finance. Guy (1917-1980), moved to São Paulo, Brazil, where he leased office buildings and remained for the rest of his life. Guy's daughters Claude and Mona remain in Brazil. Sylvain (1927-1991), moved to Lausanne, Switzerland, where he lived the rest of his life.

Salvator's son, Ronald Moreno, remained in Switzerland after his father's death. His daughter Janine Rohr-Cicurel (1947-2024) emigrated to Argentina where she became the Argentine champion of Dressage in 1989 and 1990 and also represented Argentina at the Pan American Games in 1991.

== See also ==
- Banque Misr
- Sephardi Jews
- History of the Jews in Egypt
- Pallache family
