= Studio Misr =

Egyptian film studio

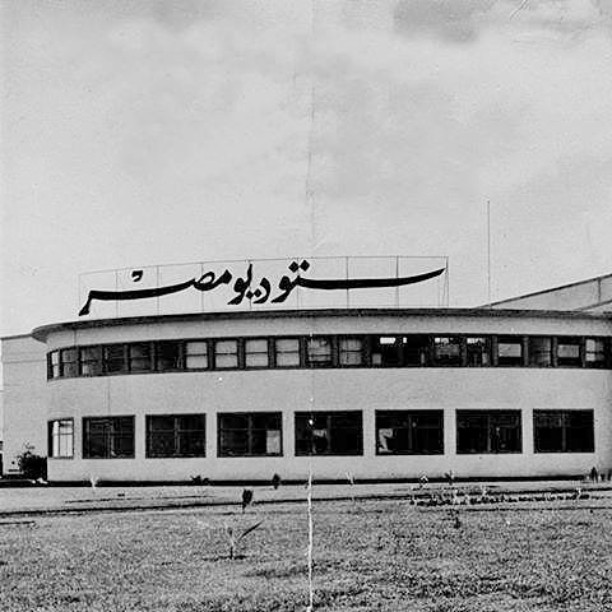
- Native name: ستوديو مصر
- Type: Film studio
- Industry: Film industry
- Founded: 12 October 1935; 90 years ago
- Founder: Talaat Harb (Banque Misr)
- Headquarters: Giza, Egypt
- Area served: Arab world • Middle East
- Owner: Egyptian Ministry of Culture
- Parent: Cultural and Cinematic Asset Management Company

Studio Misr (Eng: “The Studio of Egypt"), also known as Studios Misr, is a major Egyptian film studio founded in 1935. Founded by the economist and industrialist Talaat Harb, Studio Misr was the giant cinema project of Banque Misr, the first national bank in Egypt. It is the oldest surviving film studio in Egypt and Africa, and is today owned by the Egyptian Ministry of Culture. The studio is managed by the Cultural and Cinematic Asset Management Company, a subsidiary owned by the ministry.

Owned and staffed by Egyptians, Studio Misr transformed cinema into a real industry in Egypt and marked the beginning of the golden age of Egyptian cinema (Al-Hadari, in p. 86). Studio Misr was also considered as the sole school of cinema in Egypt through the training of its technicians and artists, until 1959, date of creation of the Higher Institute of Cinema in Giza (Al-Kalioubi, in p. 100). By producing talking narrative films and renting its facilities to other film producers, Studio Misr contributed to establishing Egypt’s important place in the Arab-speaking world. For three decades, it was the Egyptian equivalent to Hollywood's major studios, and was even called “Hollywood of the Orient.” Studio Misr was nationalized as a consequence of the nationalization of Banque Misr in February 1960 under the Nasser administration (Abou Chadi, in p. 118).

== History ==
=== Background ===
Economist and financier Talaat Harb, realised the cultural and economic impact of cinema, as films began to be made in the 1920s. At a time when feature films were being made in a few very basic film studios established first in Alexandria and then Cairo, he created the Misr Company for Acting and Cinema (MCAC), also known as Egyptian Acting and Cinema Company, which produced documentaries to promoted the Egyptian film industry.

After realising that feature films were the future of the industry, he laid the groundwork for a studio which would to provide facilities for local filmmakers to shoot and edit feature films in Egypt. He first sent four young men (Ahmed Badrakhan, Maurice Kassab, Mohamed Abdel Azim, and Hassan Mourad) to study in Germany, which then led the world in film production. Harb then recruited experts in various aspects of filmmaking, employed German director Fritz Kramp, and purchased the latest equipment. He built a state-of-the-art auditorium, Cinema Studio Misr, to help finance further equipment needed for the new studio. The luxurious new cinema was located in Emad al-Din Street, replacing an old cinema.

=== Opening and success ===
The new studio, known as Studio Misr, or Studios Misr according to the signage outside the building, was officially opened on 12 October 1935.

Studio Misr's first film was Weddad (1936), the first film to star the singer Umm Kulthum.

In 1939 Studio Misr made four films, including The Will (1939), out of a total of fifteen Egyptian films. Facing difficulty raising capital in the 1940s, Studio Misr reduced its emphasis on direct film production, increasingly renting out its development, printing and editing facilities to other Arab filmmakers.

=== World War II ===
During World War II, many poor-quality but commercially successful films were created by people wanting to earn profit, and the studio was affected by this type of competition.

In 1946, Studio Misr made three films - including Black Market (1946) - out of a total of 52 Egyptian films.

=== Nationalization ===
In 1960, the studio was nationalised by the government of Gamal Abdel Nasser.

=== 21st century ===
In the year 2000 when they were offered for privatization, cinema assets (studios and a number of theaters) were managed by the Holding Company for Tourism and Cinema under the Ministry of Public Business Sector (cited in the Cultural and Cinematic Asset Management Company website). At the end of the privatization lease in 2020, the cinema assets, including Studio Misr, were transferred to the Holding Company for Investment in Cultural and Cinematic Fields under the Ministry of Culture, established by a Cabinet decision in 2016.

In 2022, the Ministry of Culture established the Cultural and Cinematic Asset Management Company that is managing Studio Misr to date. Early in August, 2025, The Minister of Culture announced the ministry’s plan for the promotion of cinema industry in Egypt, the development of the studios and cinema assets, and the preservation of cinema heritage.

== Significance and impact ==
Several other studios were founded in Cairo in the wake of the success of Misr, including Al-Ahram, Nassibian (incorrectly spelt Nassabian or Nasabian in some sources), Galal, and Nahhas, although none attained the same stature.

== See also ==
- Egyptian cinema
- Lists of Egyptian films
- List of film production companies
