= Banque du Caire =

Egyptian bank

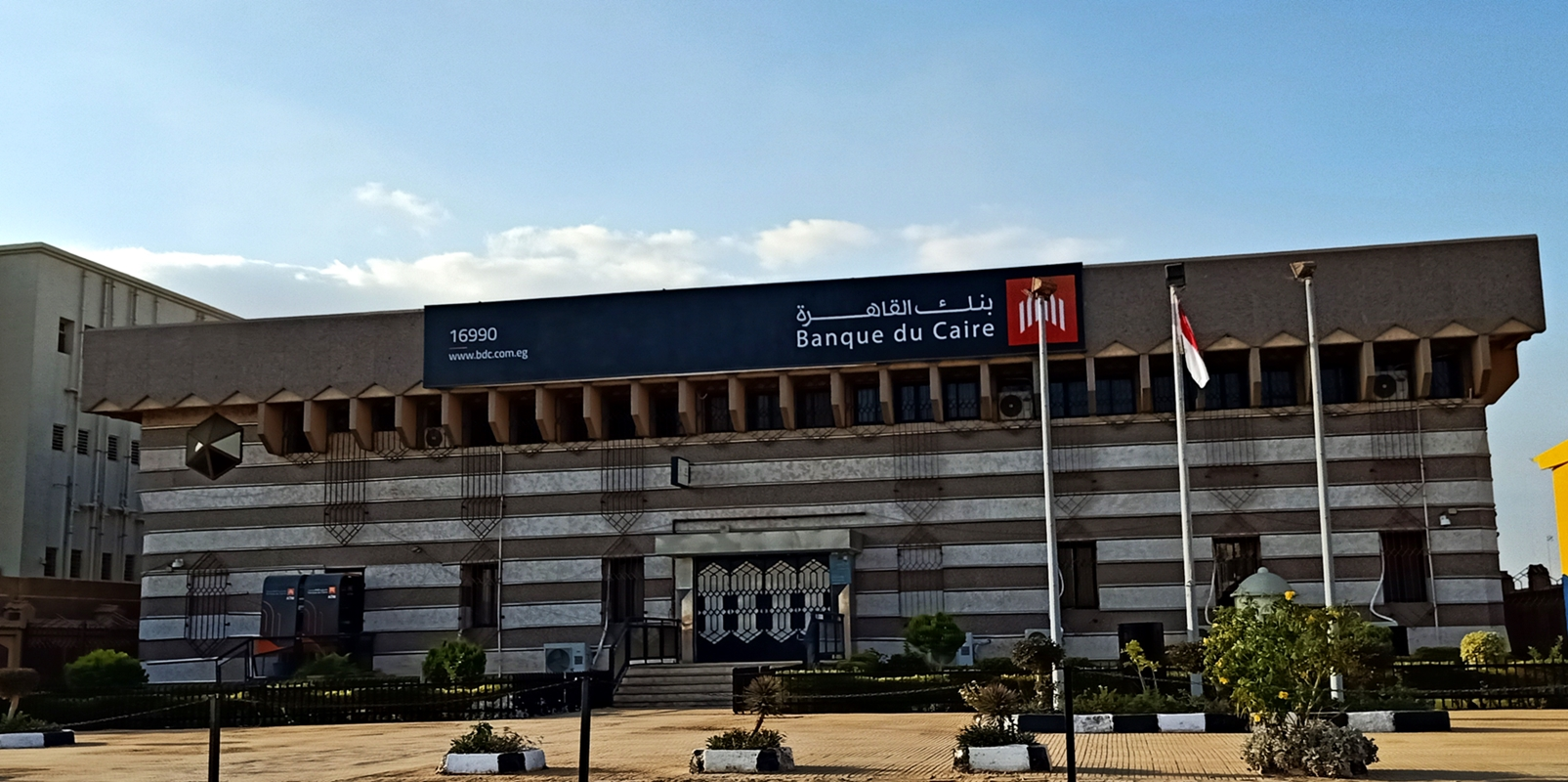
- Headquarters in Cairo
- Native name: بنك القاهرة
- Type: Private bank
- Traded as: EGX: BQDC
- ISIN: EGS600K1C019
- Industry: Banking and financial services
- Founded: 15 May 1952
- Headquarters: Cairo, Egypt
- Number of locations: 245 (2025)
- Key people: Tarek Fayed (Chairman and CEO)
- Revenue: EGP 16.1 billion (2025) (USD 300 millions)
- Operating income: EGP 41,5 billion (2025) (USD 773 millions)
- Total assets: EGP 533 billion (2025) (USD 10,2 billion)
- Total equity: EGP 61 billion (2025) (USD 1,13 billion)
- Number of employees: 9000 (2025)
- Website: www.bdc.com.eg

Banque du Caire (BDC) is a major Egyptian bank. The bank was founded in 1952. Headquartered in Cairo, the bank offers a diverse range of services and products to both corporate and retail customers. With a network of 248 branches across Egypt, Banque du Caire serves a large and diverse customer base of over 3 million.

The bank has worked on the institutionalization of microfinance across banks to promote financial inclusion. It also operates digital banking frameworks for both retail and corporate clients. The bank launched a corporate leasing venture in 2018, Cairo leasing Corporation (CLC). Banque du Caire also offers access to COMESA markets through Cairo International Bank.

== History ==
- 1952 — Several wealthy families, chief among them, the Egyptian Jewish Cattaui dynasty, and the wealthy Jewish banking Sassoon family from Aleppo established Banque du Caire (BC) as a private bank.
- 1954 — BC established a branch in Jeddah.
- 1957 — BC took over the Egyptian operations of Crédit Lyonnais and the Comptoir National d’Escompte de Paris (CNEP). which later became BNP Paribas, after the Egyptian government nationalized all French and English banks (and later all foreign banks) in the wake of the Suez Crisis. The bank viewed this step as a major milestone in its growth.
- 1959 — Prior to this, BC established a branch each in Damascus, Syria, and Amman, Jordan, and later branches in Aleppo and Latakia, both in Syria.
- 1960 — BC's branch in Amman, Jordan became the Cairo Amman Bank with BC retaining a minority position in the bank (12% in 1999.)
- 1961 — The Egyptian government nationalized BC.
- 1962 — Banque Misr Liban absorbed BC's branches in Lebanon.
- 1963 — The Syrian government nationalized BC's branches there, incorporating them into Banque de l'Unité Arabe (Bank of Arab Unity; est. 1961).
- 1964 — BC absorbed Banque de l’Union Commerciale (ex Credit Orient).
- 1975 — BC contributed its five branches in Saudi Arabia to Saudi Cairo Bank for a 40% share, pursuant to Saudi Arabia's nostrification program. That same year, BC (51%) joined with Barclays Bank (49%) to form Cairo Barclays International Bank.
- 1977 — BC joined with Banque Nationale de Paris (a successor to CNEP) to form Banque du Caire et de Paris.
- 1978 — BC joined with several Korean banks and other investors to found Cairo Far East Bank. Korean Exchange Bank was the largest shareholder with 32% and other Korean banks held 17%. BC owns 19%.
- 1970s — BC opened a branch at Manama in Bahrain and four in the UAE, at Abu Dhabi, Dubai, Sharjah, and Ras-al-Khaimah.
- 1983 — Cairo Barclays International Bank changed its name to Banque du Caire Barclays International.
- 1988 — Saudi Cairo Bank required recapitalization following difficulties, including earlier unauthorized speculation in precious metals by senior management. BC's share position fell to 20%.
- 1995 — BC joined with Bank of Alexandria, National Bank of Egypt, Banque Misr and Kato Aromatics to found Cairo Bank Uganda.
- 1997 — Saudi Cairo Bank merged with United Saudi Commercial Bank to form United Saudi Bank. BC's share position fell to 9.8%.
- 1999 — Ownership of Banque du Caire et de Paris became BNP 76% and BC 22%. United Saudi Bank merged into Saudi American Bank. BC established representative offices at Kyiv in Ukraine and Harare in Zimbabwe. Barclays increased its stake in Banque du Caire Barclays International to 60% by buying an additional 11% from Banque du Caire.
- 2000 — Barclays bought out Banque du Caire's stake in Banque du Caire Barclays International.
- 2007 — BC essentially withdrew from its ownership of (Cairo Amman Bank) in Jordan, with Banque Misr taking over its shares.
- 2009 — Five shares of BDC are sold to Misr Investment Company, and another five to Egypt-Abu Dhabi Real Estate Investment Company.
- 2010 — All shares owned by Banque Misr are transferred to Misr Investment Company.
- 2018 — Launches a new leasing business under the name Cairo Leasing Corporation (CLC).
- 2019 — The Central Bank of the United Arab Emirates approved establishment of a BC branch office in the UAE.
- In September 2024, the government announced its intention to sell its stake in 32 companies, including the Banque du Cairo, the Arab African International Bank and Alexbank, via the Egyptian Exchange.

== International Operatios ==
- Uganda: (Cairo Bank Uganda)

== See also ==
- List of largest banks in Africa
