= Fritz Kramp =

German film director

Fritz Kramp (1903 – 2 July 1961) was a German film director. He played a significant role in building the Egyptian film industry and directed early sound film productions for Studio Misr in the 1930s.

== Life and career ==
Kramp began his career in the film industry of the Weimar Republic and worked for UFA, among others. He was employed for several years by Lignose Breusing, a manufacturer of sound film technology. In 1933, he went to Paris, where he directed the Belgian–Dutch two-version production Jeunes Filles en liberté / Meisjes in Vrijheid. After the film was not a commercial success, Kramp returned to Berlin in 1935, where he married the Russian Julie Senokosnikow.

In 1935, Kramp was recruited by the newly founded Studio Misr under Talaat Harb in Cairo. Although originally intended to work as an editor and sound technician, he, together with sound engineer Mustafa Wali, who had trained in Berlin, took over the establishment of the sound film department. He directed the studio's first feature film, Wedad. The film was the largest Egyptian production of its time and also marked the acting debut of the famous singer Umm Kulthum. It was the first Egyptian film invited to the Venice Film Festival, had a theatrical release in the United States, and was reviewed in European newspapers.

According to Egyptian film historian Ahmed al-Hadari, Kramp was given the director's role because, when viewing the footage initially shot by Ahmed Badrakhan, he declared it uneditable and convinced the studio head to put him in charge. Badrakhan resigned in protest. Kramp presumably did not speak a word of Arabic and developed his own system of communication with the film crew.

Kramp's second and final directorial work for Studio Misr was the historical film Lasheen. Released in 1938, it was later included in the Bibliotheca Alexandrina's list of the 100 best Egyptian films in 2006.

When World War II broke out in 1939, Kramp left Egypt, probably due to the risk of internment as a German national. A certificate from the Reich Ministry for Public Enlightenment and Propaganda dated 28 November 1939 confirms that Kramp was authorised to produce propaganda films for UFA. During the war, he made the war newsreels Neues Leben in Paris (1942) and Ein Markttag in Schässburg (1943). On 15 March 1940, he applied for admission to the Reich Film Chamber, which was granted. A field post letter from 1941 also identifies him as a Wehrmacht soldier.

Nothing is known about Kramp's professional activities after the end of the war. He died on 2 July 1961 at the age of 58 in Hamburg while being driven to a hospital.

== Filmography ==
- 1932: Kavaliere vom Kurfürstendamm
- 1933: Jeunes Filles en liberté / Meisjes in Vrijheid
- 1936: Weddad (وداد)
- 1938: Lasheen (لاشين)
- 1942: Neues Leben in Paris (short film)
- 1943: Ein Markttag in Schässburg (short film)
