= Soares family =

Egyptian Sephardic Jewish family

- 1800–1957
| Musiri family | Qatawi family |
- Leader: Suares

The Suares family was a Sephardic Jewish family who settled in Egypt. The family's three brothers, Raphael, Youssef, and Felix, became prominent in political and economic activity in Egypt and founded the Suares Foundation in 1857. They were credited with establishing many banks, in addition to participating with other Jewish families in Egypt's economy, including the Qatawi family and the Rollo family.

== Family ==
The Soares family, a Sephardic family of Portuguese origin that settled in Egypt in the early 19th century and obtained French citizenship, consisted of 5 brothers, in addition to their sons, who contributed prominently to the Egyptian economy. The Sawaris family also owned stakes and shares in many companies, and many of its members held presidential and administrative positions in many of them. The father, Soares, died in 1848, and the family's eldest, Mordach, died in 1861. His brother Yaqoub died in 1865, Yusuf in 1900, their sister Alice in 1902, his brother Al-Hammam Al-Wajih in 1905, and Rafael Soares in 1902 .

Among the most prominent members of the family: Alice Sawaris, who married Youssef Qatawi Pasha and is the first runner-up to Queen Nazli, wife of King Fouad. Leon Soares (son of Felix Soares) took over the management of the Sheikh Fadl Land Company and the management of the Kom Ombo Valley Company. Upon his father's death, Leon left the Sawaris Foundation to succeed his father in the management of the National Bank and the Egyptian Land Bank.

The Sawaris family did not play a major role in the affairs of the Jewish community, with the exception of Edgar Sawaris, who assumed the presidency of the group in Alexandria in the period from 1914 to 1917.

== Family contributions ==
The Sawas family founded the Sawas Foundation in 1875, which was a large company known in the field of transportation and building companies, and from it many railway companies, sugar companies, and other entertainment fields, among others, branched out, including:

=== Banks ===
The family founded Sawaris Bank in 1880, and it was re-established on August 10, 1936. Its main headquarters was in Alexandria, in addition to two branches in Cairo and Tanta. It served the cotton trade and insurance companies. Its capital reached 100 thousand pounds in July 1943, and it was headed by Jack Najjar. Its most prominent members are Carlos Soares, Freddie Sachs, and Youssef Qatawi.

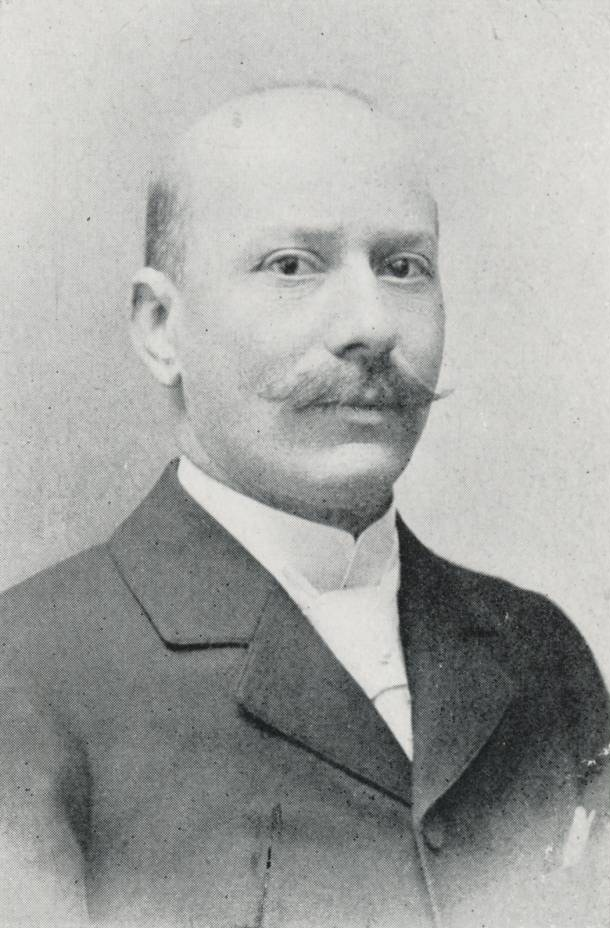
Raphael Soares in 1906

Raphael Soares, in cooperation with the British Sir Ernest Cassel, established the National Bank of Egypt on June 25, 1898, with a capital of one million British pounds. The bank's functions and business developed continuously throughout its history in accordance with the economic and political changes that the country went through. In the 1950s In the past, the bank carried out the functions of central banks and then, after its nationalization in the 1960s, devoted itself to the work of commercial banks, while continuing to perform the functions of the central bank in areas where the latter had no branches, in addition to undertaking, since the mid-1960s, the issuance and management of investment certificates for the state. This bank is the second bank in Egypt after the National Bank of Egypt and one of the oldest banks in Egypt. It was founded in 1880 under the name of the Egyptian Land Bank and was co-founded by Mousa Qatawi, Raphael Soares, and Robert Rollo. The bank's capital when it was founded was 40 million French francs, reaching 8 million pounds in 1942.

One of the squares was named “Soares Square” after the family, whose name later changed to Mustafa Kamel Square since 1939.

=== Transportation ===
==== Land transportation ====
Sawaris founded the “Sawaris Passenger Vehicles” company, best known for its Sawaris wagons

=== Egypt - Helwan Railway ===
To facilitate transportation from Cairo to Helwan, he issued a decree establishing the Helwan Railway in 1870, and it was completely completed in 1877. In 1899, Khedive Abbas Helmy II officially opened a new bathroom establishment built by the Egypt-Helwan Railway Company, and the institution was leased to the “George Nungovich” company. Khedive Abbas Helmy was on the board of the Fayoum Railway Company and the Delta Railway Board ( Which is followed by the Helwan-Bab El Louk railway line. After the establishment of Hammam Helwan in 1874 AD and to serve its visitors, Khedive Ismail completed the line from Tora to Helwan, so the first train trip set off from the citadel to Helwan in the year 1877. In 1879, Egypt was struck by a financial crisis and the removal of Khedive Ismail and his son Khedive Tawfiq took over the rule of Egypt. The government withdrew from development projects in Helwan and abandoned the city. The condition of the train deteriorated and its trips were reduced to only two trips per day. After the financial situation of the country stabilized, it was decided in 1888 to grant the Helwan concession to a private company made up of a number of wealthy people, including Moses Musiri, the Qatawi family, the Sawaris family, and other partners, so in 1890 they founded a company to manage this project. It was known as the “Metropolitan and Cairo-Helwan Railway” with a capital of 120,000 pounds sterling and was granted the right to extend a line from Tora to Bab El Louk. The first train began its journey on the modified line from Helwan to Bab El Louk on November 1, 1889. In 1891, the Council of Ministers approved granting a concession to the same company to extend a line from Helwan station to the Nile, passing through the Khedive Tawfiq Palace, for easy access to his yachts. In 1904, a contract was concluded to merge the "Metropolitan" Company into the Egyptian Delta Railway Company, so that all of the company's properties in Helwan became the property of the Delta Railway Company.

== Delta Railway ==
In 1890, he established the railway company from Assiut and extended the line to Girga, and extended railway lines from Damanhour to Al-Rahmaniyah, and from Shebin al-Kom to Menouf. And from Fayoum to Sinorus, and was handed over to the Egyptian government after its completion, with the condition that he benefit from the company's profits for 20 years.

In 1895, the railway was extended from Qena to Aswan.

=== Eastern Railway ===
In 1896, the Eastern Economic Railway Company was established and it made several contributions to extending railway lines throughout Egypt. It was then sold to the Delta Railway Company and merged with the Helwan Railway Company.

== Agriculture ==
And financing the construction of the Aswan reservoir. Sawaris also partnered with Castle and the Qatawi family to purchase 300,000 acres of Sunni Circle land and resell it to major landlords and real estate companies. Sawaris also participated with French capital in establishing the All Egyptian Sugar and Refining Factories Company in 1897, which was included in the Wadi Kom Ombo Joint Stock Company in 1905. It was one of the largest joint projects between Qatawi, Sawaris, Rollo and Manasseh companies, and it was one of the largest agricultural companies in Egypt.

The family owned large areas of agricultural land and construction land in central Cairo, where one of the squares was named Sawaris Square (now Mostafa Kamel). The family purchased the Sheikh Fadl inspection office from the Sunni Department in 1892, and the Badrashin lands inspection. They also established the Sunni Department Company in 1898, which purchased the Sunni Department lands, which amounted to 300 thousand acres of the best agricultural land in Egypt, for an amount of six million and four hundred thousand Egyptian pounds, which is the value of the debt that It was on the circuit.

== Swars wagons ==
Swaris is a name given to carts pulled by mules or horses. They were used as a means of transportation to transport passengers in the late nineteenth century and disappeared in the early twentieth century. This means came as a natural development for the use of donkeys and mules for individual transportation, which prompted a group of people to think about creating a means of transportation that could accommodate a larger number of people and be in the form of a wooden cart pulled by mules and horses. It was called “Emnibus.”

As for the name “Suares,” it was given by passengers and citizens in reference to Its owner. A carriage rides on it wearing a fez, a yellow suit, and a copper plate on his chest with his name and number. The fare for the ride was 3 millimes. Immediately after the appearance of the swaras on the streets of Cairo, the drivers of Karoo vehicles were affected, which was the only means of transportation before the appearance of the swaras. The Sawaris had more than one line: the line of the citadel, our Master Al-Hussein, passing through the Maghreblin and the Mutawali Gate, the line of the citadel, Sayyida Zeinab, passing through the Observed Basin and Pharaoh's Pool, and the line of our Lady to our master Al-Hussein.

=== In popular culture ===
==== Movies ====
- Sawaris vehicles have been famous in the streets of Cairo for a long time, especially in the history of cinema. Perhaps one of the most famous sayings in Egyptian cinema is:
  The Sawaris hit me, Mr. Al-Sayyid
  from the actress Amal Zayed in the role of (Sitt Amina) when she broke her leg when she went To Al-Hussein without her husband's permission, in Bain Al-Kasserine movie, because of the popularity of those vehicles at that time.

== See also ==
- Qatawi family
