= MCAC =

MCAC may refer to:

- Chesapeake Detention Facility, formerly the Maryland Correctional Adjustment Center
- McMichael Canadian Art Collection, a art museum in Vaughan, Ontario, Canada
- Manitoba Colleges Athletic Conference in Canada
- Metropolitan Collegiate Athletic Conference, former American college sports conference of the National Collegiate Athletic Association
- Middlesex County Automobile Club, motor club in England
- Midlands Collegiate Athletic Conference, former American college sports conference of the National Association of Intercollegiate Athletics
- Midwest Conference, an NCAA Division III athletic conference known as the Midwest Collegiate Athletic Conference from 1921 to 1994
- Minnesota College Athletic Conference, an American college sports conference of the National Junior College Athletic Association
- Misr Company for Acting and Cinema, alternative name for the Egyptian Acting and Cinema Company, a former film production studio
