= Cairo Amman Bank =

- Industry: Finance
- Headquarters: Wadi Saqra, Jordan
- Key people: Yazid Adnan Al-Mufti, Chairman; Mohammad Kamal Eddin Bakri, Vice Chairman Representing Banque du Caire; Hamed krieshan
- Products: Financial services
- Number of employees: ~1500
- Website: www.cab.jo

The Cairo Amman Bank is a full-service bank in Jordan and Palestine, with head office in Amman. The head office for the Palestinian territories is in Ramallah. The bank operates about 84 branches and offices in Jordan and 21 in the Palestinian territories. CAB ranks sixth in Jordan and third in the Palestinian territories based on assets. It is also ranked third in the Palestinian territories based on the number of branches it has. The bank is a member of the Jonet ATM network in Jordan.

== History ==
Cairo Amman Bank was established on 14 January 1960 as a Jordanian public shareholding company and began its banking services on 1 July 1960. At the time, Egypt's Banque du Caire converted its branch in Amman, Jordan, into a locally owned and registered company; Banque du Caire retained a minority position in the bank (12% in 1999), but has since withdrawn almost completely, with Egypt's Banque Misr taking over its stake in 2007. CAB's first branch was launched in the Palestinian territories in 1961. CAB returned to the Palestinian territories in 1986 with a branch.

CAB was the first bank in the world to begin operating ATMs enabled with iris-recognition technology, which were first deployed in 2006. To date, the iris-recognition ATMs have facilitated over 1.2 million transactions worth $422 million. When the Syrian refugee crisis began, CAB's iris-recognition ATMs were adopted by the United Nations High Commissioner for Refugees (UNHCR) to disperse financial aid to refugees. CAB is the first bank in the world to introduce the iris print as a means of identification allowing customers to access their bank accounts and doing away with the ATM cards and the pass (secret) number. The system recognizes the customer and allows him to access his account and complete his banking transaction either at the service counter or at the ATM at the branches.

== Profile ==
In order to increase its coverage in Jordan, CAB has established a presence in Jordanian post offices.
