= Weddad =

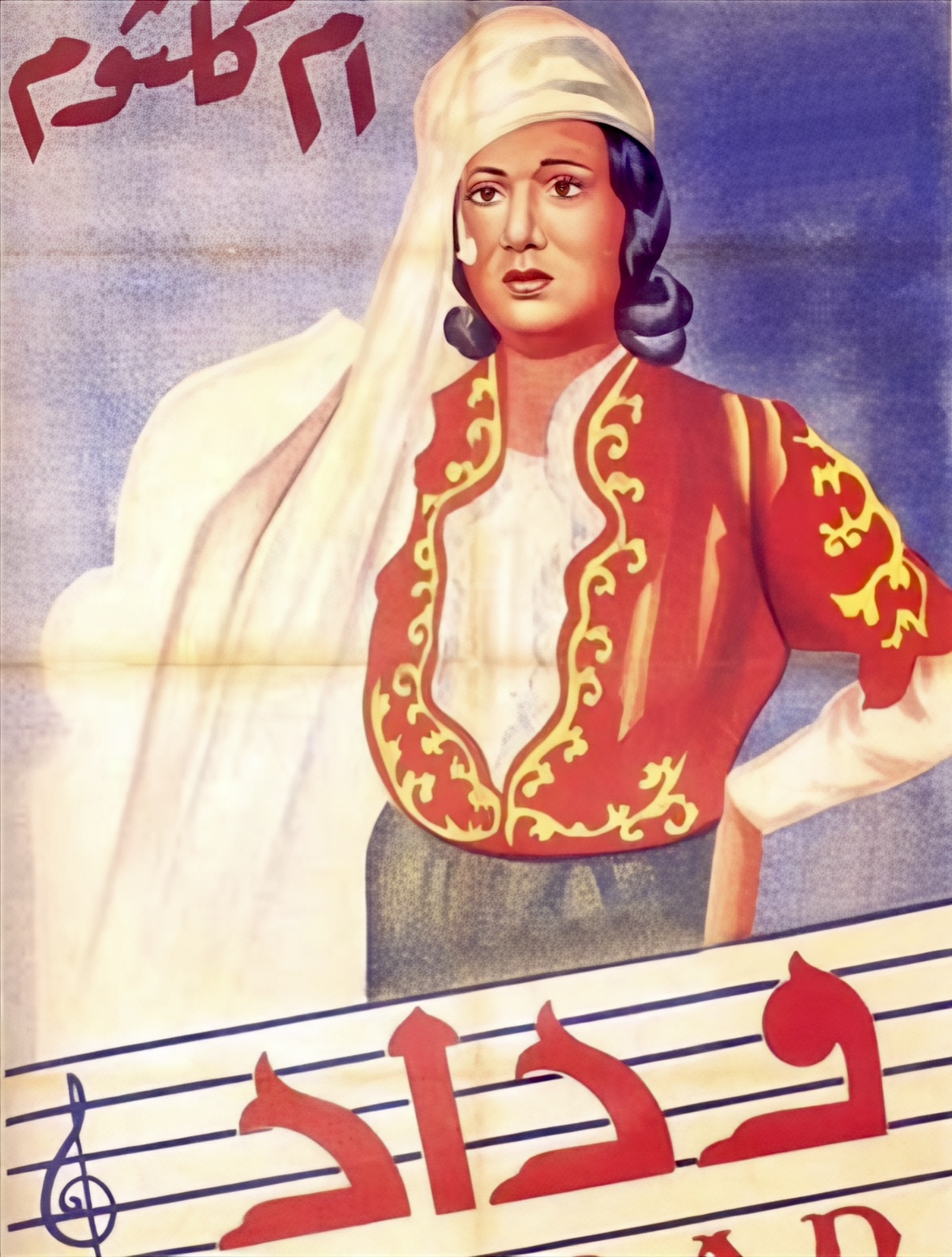
- Theatrical release poster
- Directed by: Fritz Kramp, Gamal Madkoor
- Screenplay by: Ahmed Rami; Ahmed Badrakhan
- Produced by: Talaat Harb
- Starring: Umm Kulthum; Ahmed Allam
- Cinematography: Sammi Bill
- Edited by: Niazi Mustafa
- Music by: Mohamed El Qasabgi; Zakariyya Ahmad; Riad Al Sunbati; Docteur Bardi
- Production company: Studio Misr
- Distributed by: Studio Misr
- Release date: 1936
- Running time: 100
- Country: Egypt
- Language: Arabic

Weddad (also transliterated as Wydad, lit. “Love”/“Affection”) is a 1936 Egyptian romantic musical film. The film is based on a romantic tale inspired by the One Thousand and One Nights. The biggest production of its time, it was the film debut of Um Kalthoum. The film's success turned Studio Misr into the top studio in Egypt.

The sports team Wydad AC in Casablanca, Morocco, is named after the film.

== Synopsis ==
In the time of the Mamluk Sultanate, a rich trader named Baher has no choice but to sell his slave Wydad, with whom he is madly in love, when he loses everything. But destiny will help them meet again.

== Cast and crew ==
- Umm Kulthum as Weddad
- Ahmed Allam as Baher
- Mukhtar Othman as Mansour
- Koka as slave girl Shahd
- Mansi Fahmy as Sheikh Radwan
- Fattouh Nashaty as Saeed
- Mahmoud El-Meliguy as the messenger
- Yehya Nagaty as a slave buyer
- Fouad Fahim as the bath house attendant
- Ibrahim El-Gazzar as the beggar
- Hassan El-Baroudi as Yazdi
- Ibrahim Amara as the sheikh

== Songs ==
- “أيها الرائح المجد” (“O Smell of Glory”), lyrics by Sharif Al-Razi and music by Zakariyya Ahmad
- “يا بشير الأنس” (“Oh Bashir Al-Anas”), lyrics by Ahmed Rami and music by Zakariyya Ahmad
- “يا ليل نجومك شهود” (“O Night, Your Stars Are Witnesses”), lyrics by Ahmed Rami and music by Zakariyya Ahmad
- “حيّوا الربيع” (“Salute the Spring”), lyrics by Ahmed Rami and music by Riad Al Sunbati
- “على بلد المحبوب” (“In the Country of the Beloved”, sung by Abdo Al-Srouji), lyrics by Ahmed Rami and music by Riad Al Sunbati
- “ليه يا زمان كان هوايا” (“Why Was This Time a Holiday?”), lyrics by Ahmed Rami and music by Mohamed El Qasabgi
- “يا للي ودادك صفالي” (“Oh My, Your Father Is Safali”), lyrics by Ahmed Rami and music by Mohamed El Qasabgi
- “يا طير يا عايش أسير” (“O Bird, Captured Live”), lyrics by Ahmed Rami and music by Mohamed El Qasabgi

== See also ==
- List of Egyptian films of the 1930s
