= Immaculate Irumba =

Ugandan businesswoman and corporate executive

- Born: c. 1977 (age 48–49); Uganda
- Education: Makerere University; Uganda Management Institute
- Occupations: Banker and corporate executive
- Years active: Since 2003
- Title: CEO of Cairo Bank Uganda

Immaculate Irumba Komuhangi (born c. 1977), commonly known as Immaculate Irumba, is a Ugandan banker and corporate executive, who works as the chief operating officer (COO) of Cairo Bank Uganda, a commercial bank in the country. Prior to that, she was the senior projects manager at Housing Finance Bank, another commercial bank.

== Background and education ==
Komuhangi is a Ugandan national. She attended local primary and secondary schools, before being admitted to Makerere University, Uganda's largest and oldest public university. She graduated with a Bachelor of Arts in Social Sciences degree from there, in 2000. Her second degree, a Masters of Arts in Economic Policy and Planning, was also awarded by Makerere University. She also holds a Postgraduate Diploma in Financial Management, obtained from the Uganda Management Institute, in Kampala, Uganda's capital city. She holds ITIL certification and is a qualified Project Management Professional (PMP).

== Career ==
As of June 2021, Komuhangi's banking career stretched back over 17 years. Her expertise spans bank operations, retail banking and business technology. Starting out as a branch manager with Stanbic Bank Uganda Limited, where she spent five years, she was hired by Housing Finance Bank (HFB), Uganda's largest mortgage lender. She spent a total of ten years there. At HFB, she led the bank's "digital transformation" process. In 2019, she left HFB and joined Cairo Bank Uganda, where she heads the bank's operations department. She is a member of the senior management team at Cairo Bank Uganda.

== Personal ==
She is a married mother of three children.

== Other considerations ==
Komuhangi is a member of the Project Management Institute and of the Institute of Corporate Governance of Uganda, two corporate entities in the country.
