= Egyptian Acting and Cinema Company =

Egyptian film production company

- Company type: Film production company
- Industry: Film industry
- Founded: 1925
- Founder: Talaat Harb
- Headquarters: Cairo, Egypt
- Key people: Mohamed Bayumi, Ahmed Bedr Khan, Hassan Murad, Mohamed Karim
- Products: Films, advertisements, news films

Egyptian Acting and Cinema Company, or Sharikat misr lil-tamthil wa al-sinema, also known as Misr Company for Acting and Cinema (MCAC), was a film production company founded in 1925 by economist Talaat Harb. It was a prelude to Harb's establishment of Studio Misr.

== Background ==
During the period between 1919 and 1925, foreigners began producing short films that gained popularity among Egyptian audiences. Most of the crew members working on these films were foreigners, while the actors were mainly Egyptians who worked in theater. At this time, the cinema field was devoid of Egyptians working in the technical aspect, except for Mohamed Bayoumi, who studied cinema in Europe and returned to Egypt in 1923 to begin his career as a cinematographer. In 1923, the first Egyptian feature film, directed by lawyer Victor Rosito, titled In the Land of Tutankhamun, was released. The film was shot by Bayoumi.

In 1925, prominent Egyptian economist Talaat Harb, founder of Bank Misr and its companies, established a cinema division within the Egyptian Advertising Company under the name Misr Film. Mohamed Bayoumi worked there, and the bank purchased the equipment for the Mohamed Bayoumi Studio, which he had established earlier. In the same year, a royal decree was issued to establish the Egyptian Theatre and Cinema Company, an Egyptian joint stock company and one of Bank Misr's companies. The purpose of this company was to establish and operate theaters and cinemas on its own or on behalf of others.

== History ==
In 1924, Harb decided to venture into the cinematic field, not just as a film production process but also as a national industry. He and his colleagues obtained a license from King Fouad on 13 June 1925, to establish an Egyptian joint-stock company known as "Sharikat Misr lil-Tamthil wa al-Sinema" (Egyptian Company for Acting and Cinema) with a capital of 15,000 Egyptian pounds, financed by Bank Misr, which was also founded by Talaat Harb in 1921. Harb took the opportunity of his travels to Europe to learn about the cinema industry and its development.

The establishment of Sharikat Misr lil-Tamthil wa al-Sinema was part of the Egyptianization movement after the 1919 revolution, which aimed to create new cultural forms in Egypt. It was also known as Misr Company for Acting and Cinema (MCAC). It was a film production company founded by Talaat Harb.

Harb did not follow the same path as other producers who came after him and produced long feature films. Instead, he started with short films and set up a small factory – a flat above the Misr Printing building at 40 Al-Dawawin Street – equipped with everything needed for film production. This experiment became the nucleus of the cinema studio.

Afterward, Harb planned for an essential phase in the cinema industry, focusing on long feature films. To accomplish this, he aimed to complete the artistic construction of the cinema industry by establishing a studio that accommodates Egyptian artistic elements and serves as the basis for an authentic Egyptian cinematic renaissance.

Before the establishment of Studio Misr, there were no real cinema studios in Egypt. Studio Misr is considered the first studio in the Egyptian cinema if we exclude "Al-Nuzha Studio" in Alexandria and "Bayoumi Studio" in Shubra, as they appeared before the first Egyptian film and ceased operating after a year. The studios that appeared with the first Egyptian film were not real studios in the full sense of the word, but rather corresponded to the state of cinema at the time, such as "Al-Laqizi, Tojo, Lama, Heliopolis, Ramses, Sharq, Lotus, Egyptian Talking Films, and Katsaros Studios."

The company employed the few Egyptians with expertise in film, such as Mohamed Bayumi and Hassan Murad, but relied heavily on foreign experts. The culmination of these efforts led to the creation of Studio Misr in 1935, which became the largest cinema studio in the Arab world at the time.

In 1926, Mohammed Karim, who worked as a director with the Egyptian Acting and Cinema Company, suggested adapting the novel Zaynab (1913) by Mohamed Hussein Heikal into a film. This suggestion was initially rejected by both Ufa, a German cinema company, and Talaat Harb. However, Karim eventually produced the film with the help of his friend, the famous actor Youssef Wahbi. Zaynab was released as a silent movie in 1930 and as a sound remake, also directed by Karim, in 1952.

== Legacy ==
The Egyptian Acting and Cinema Company played a crucial role in the development of the Egyptian film industry. Its establishment and support of the education of Egyptian filmmakers laid the groundwork for the creation of Studio Misr and the growth of the Egyptian film industry, which eventually became one of the most prominent film industries in the Arab world.
