= Cairo Bank Uganda =

Ugandan commercial bank

Cairo Bank Uganda Limited
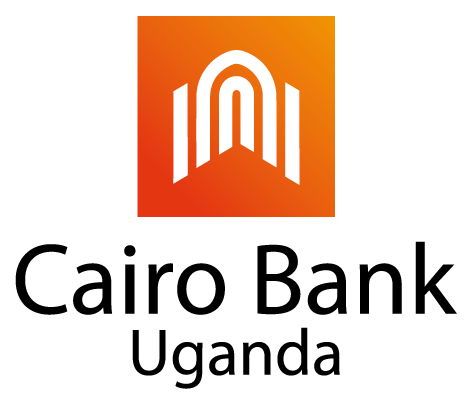
- Company type: Private, Subsidiary of Banque du Caire
- Industry: Financial services
- Founded: 1995; 31 years ago
- Headquarters: Arie Towers; Plot 16 Mackinnon Road; Nakasero, Kampala; Uganda
- Key people: Sylvia Jagwe Owachi; Executive Director; Immaculate Irumba; Chief Operating Officer
- Products: Personal banking: checking, savings, kids and teens, investments, loans, debit cards Business banking: checking, savings, investments, loans Corporate & institutional banking Treasury: foreign exchange, bid bonds
- Total assets: USh:378.563 billion (US$103.572 million) (June 2023).
- Number of employees: 146 (2020)
- Website: cbu.co.ug

Cairo Bank Uganda Limited (CBUL), formerly known as Cairo International Bank (CIB), is a commercial bank in Uganda. It is licensed by the Bank of Uganda, the central bank and national banking regulator. It is a subsidiary of Egypt-based banking group, Banque du Caire Group.

== Headquarters location ==
Cairo Bank Uganda has its headquarters at Arie Towers, at Plot 16 Mackinnon Road, Nakasero Hill, in the central business district of Kampala, Uganda's capital city. The geographical coordinates of the bank's headquarters are: 0°19'17.0"N, 32°35'05.0"E (Latitude:0.321389; Longitude:32.584722).

== Overview ==
CBUL focuses on serving small and medium businesses (SMEs), educational institutions, non-governmental organizations and corporate entities. In 2020, the bank re-branded and turned its focus on meeting the banking needs of SMEs. Cairo Bank Uganda Limited is a fully owned subsidiary by Banque du Caire (BDC), an Egypt-based financial services conglomerate with total assets in excess of US$12 billion, as of September 2020.

As of June 2023 the total assets of Cairo Bank Uganda were valued at USh378,563,372,000 (approx. US103,572,126) with shareholders' equity of USh163,190,161,000 (approx. US$44,647,616).

== History ==
Incorporated as Cairo International Bank in 1995, the bank began operations in the same year following the issuance of a commercial banking license by the Bank of Uganda. In 2020, Banque du Caire, which owned 62.4 percent of the shares of stock of the Ugandan subsidiary, acquired the 24 percent shareholding owned by Banque Misr and the 13.6 percent owned by Banque Misr, to become the sole owner of 100 percent of the stock of the Ugandan bank.

== Management board ==
Cairo Bank Uganda (CBU) is governed by an eight-person board of directors. Sylvia Jagwe Owachi is the managing director. She replaced Ahmad Maher Nada, the previous CEO, who left CBU and took up an assignment at Banque du Caire in Egypt, effective January 2022. He served as MD/CEO at CBU for three and one half years.

== Branch network ==
CBU has the following branches, as of September 2020:

1. Main Branch : Lotis Towers, Plot 16 - Mackinnon Road, Nakasero, Kampala.

2. Kampala Road Branch: Greenland Towers, Plot 30 Kampala Road, Kampala.

3. Kikuubo Branch: Shamba Complex, Kyagwe Road, Kampala.

4. Garden City Branch: Garden City Shopping Mall, Yusuf Lule Road, Kampala.

5. Bugoloobi Branch: Plot 1-5 Spring Close, Bugoloobi, Kampala.

6. Bweyogerere Branch: Bweyogerere, Kira Town.

7. Mbarara Branch: Rwebikona Building, Mbarara – Fort Portal Road, Mbarara.

== Rebranding ==
In September 2020, Cairo International Bank Limited changed its name to Cairo Bank Uganda Limited, relocated to new headquarter premises and changed focus to SME customers.

== See also ==
- List of banks in Uganda
- Banking in Uganda
- Banque du Caire
- National Bank of Egypt
