= Hassan Mourad =

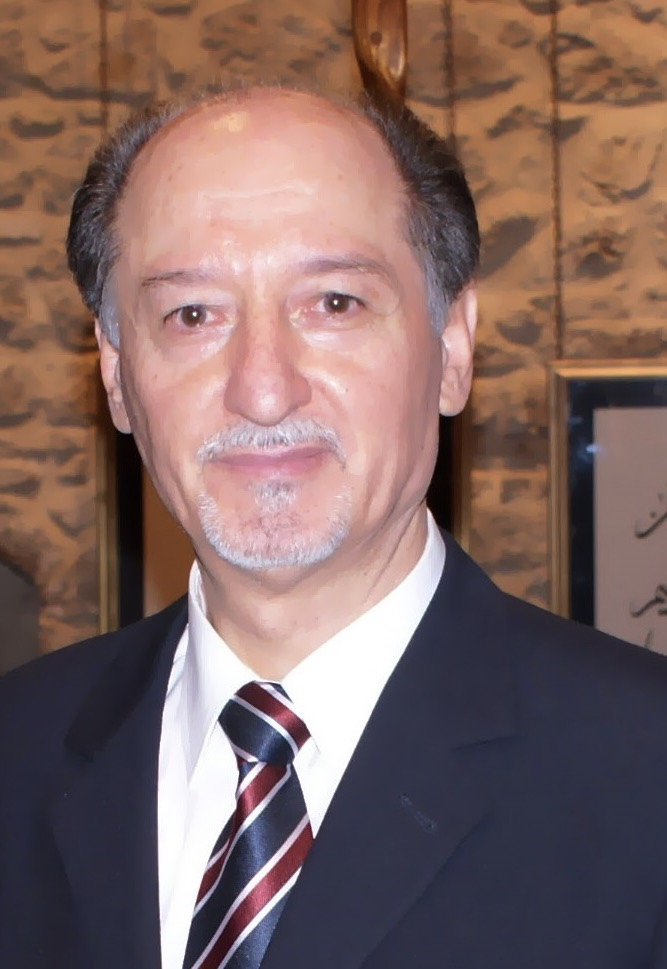
Hassan Mourad

Hassan Sobhi Mourad (January 3, 1942 – August 14, 2015) was an academic, a calligrapher, an artist, a researcher, an author and a poet. He specialized in Arabic calligraphy, its development and teaching, drawing to all age groups, as well as contributing in writing art-related articles. Born in Syria, Hassan Mourad lived abroad in various countries and continents for over thirty-five years due to his career in diplomatic service. Though living abroad for most of his adult life, he remained passionate about the Arabic Language, its history and the art of Arabic Calligraphy. Mourad was influenced at the early age of 14 by a fellow Syrian writer without having ever met him; this artist, AbdulRahman Fakhoory, predicted a bright future in art for Mourad.

Mourad was also influenced by other Arab artists, such as Hashim the Calligrapher, the Turkish Hamid Alamady, Mostapha Raqim and Hamdallah Alamasy, as well as the Persian Meer Ali Tabreez, Abbas Akhaween and others. Having so many historical figures to look up to build a foundation of an ever growing passion for Arabic Calligraphy, which encouraged Mourad to learn the principles and arts. For years thereafter, he continued studying and developing his skill, his talent and the arts.

Mourad designed artworks and logos for various purposes, and a mural for King Fahd Academy in Bonn, Germany. He participated in restoring artworks, scripts, and decorations of an old palace in his early years of practicing art. He also copied pages of the Quran in the Diwani Script that was never used for the Quran before. Mourad used Naskh and Ottoman scripts in decorations he designed for many pieces of his work, also copying many verses of the Quran.

The artist was the first to employ the Arabic letter, applying artistic value without distorting the letter, in creating an artwork for his 1986 exhibition in Utrecht, the Netherlands. He created pieces of fine art with his individual touch of art, with variations in both color and black and white. Mourad was passionate about Arabic Calligraphy, the Arabic script, and its principles of beauty and the distribution of its letters, which in professional calligraphy follow meticulous rules and principles. He is cited as a professional academic and calligrapher, and through extensive research of the history of Arabic Calligraphy, Mourad concludes that the Misnad style of Arabic Calligraphy is the original form of Arabic Calligraphy and has influenced future calligraphy styles.

== Font design ==
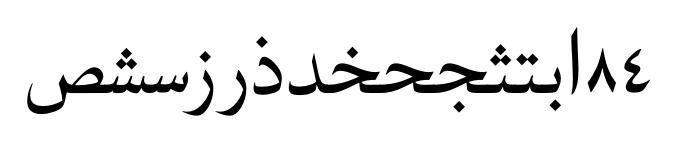
Hassan Font Family

In 1993, Hassan Mourad registered a custom Arabic font, Hassan, with Linotype.
