= Joseph Cattaui =

Egyptian businessman and politician

Joseph Aslan Cattaui Pasha يوسف اصلان قطاوي باشا
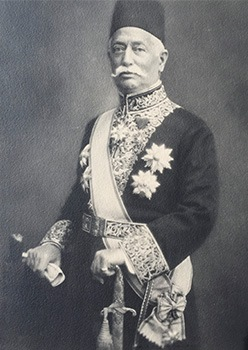
- Born: March 20, 1862
- Died: May 12, 1942
- Education: Ecole Centrale Paris
- Occupations: Industrialist, Politician
- Spouse: Alice Suares
- Children: Ince Cattaui, Aslan Léon Cattaui, René Jacob Abbas Cattaui

Joseph Aslan Cattaui Pasha (20 March 1862 – 1942) was an Egyptian businessman and politician, who served as President of the Jewish community of Cairo from 1924 until his death in 1942.

== Life and professional career ==
Joseph Aslan Cattaui was born in Cairo on 20 March 1862, the fourth of twelve children of Aslan Menasce Cattaui Pasha and Grazia Benroubi. He studied engineering at the École Centrale Paris, graduating with a diploma in 1882.

On his return to Egypt, he briefly joined the Ministry of Public Works, before departing to Moravia, where he trained in a sugar refinery. Back in Egypt, he became an associate of Suarès Frères & Co., and contributed to work on the construction of the Helwan railway, the water works at Tanta, the Société des sucreries. In 1904, he founded the Wadi Kom Ombo Company, a huge agricultural and land holding company, in collaboration with Suarès Frères, and Sir Ernest Cassel. In 1920, he co-founded Banque Misr, with Talaat Harb Pacha and others, and joined its board of directors.

== Political career ==
Cattaui was raised to the rank of Pasha in 1912. In 1913, he was elected as member of the legislative assembly, and continued in his mandate until the assembly's dissolution in 1922. A year earlier, he had been appointed to the 32-member commission that worked on drafting the Egyptian constitution. In 1924, he was appointed Minister of Finance, and became Minister of Communication in 1925. From 1927 until his withdrawal from politics in 1939, he was member of the Egyptian Senate.

== Personal life ==
Cattaui's daughter died of typhoid fever at the age of 18 at the end of December, 1906.

== Companies ==
Joseph Cattaui Pasha was involved in, or directed the following companies:

- Société Wadi Kom Ombo (1904- )
- Banque Misr (1920- )
- Société Cheikh Fadl
- Union Fonciere d'Egypte
- Compagnie Frigorifique d'Egypte
- Société des Halles Centrales
- Société des Suceries
- Compagnie des Eaux du Caire
- Imperial Chemical Industries (Egypt)
- National Insurance of Egypt (established 1900)

== Works ==
- 1920: Pour mes enfants. Paris: L. Carteret.
- 1926: L'Égypte: aperçu historique et géographique; gouvernement et institutions; vie économique et sociale. Le Caire: Institut Français d'Archéologie Orientale.
- 1927: Le regime des Capitulations en Egypte. Le Caire: Imprimerie de l'Institut francais d'archeologie orientale
- 1931: Coup d'oeil sur la chronologie de la nation égyptienne. Paris: Plon.
- 1935: Le Khédive Isma'il et la dette de l'Egypte. Le Caire: Misr
- 1943: Les calendriers antiques. Le Caire: Éditions de la revue de Caire

== Honours ==
=== Egyptian national honours ===
Ribbon bar	Honour
	Grand Cordon of the Order of the Nile

=== Foreign honors ===
Ribbon bar	Country	Honour
	France	Commandeur of the Légion d'honneur
