= Banque Misr =

Egyptian bank

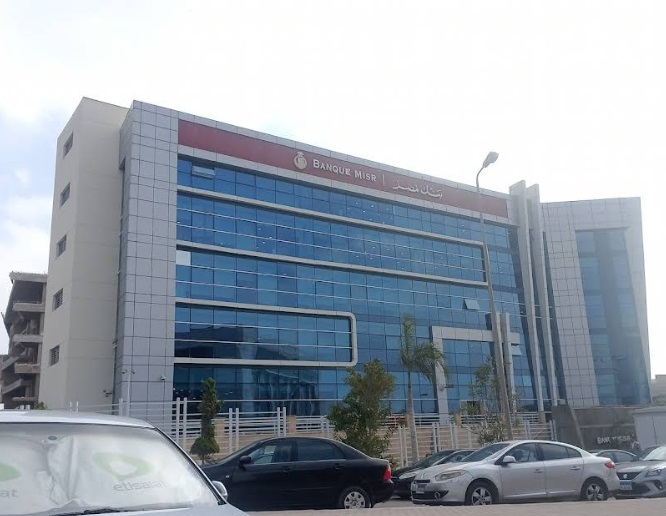
- New headquarters of Banque Misr in Cairo
- Native name: بنك مصر ش.م.م.
- Type: Public bank
- Industry: Banking and financial services
- Founded: 13 April 1920; 106 years ago
- Founders: Talaat Harb; Joseph Cattaui; Joseph Cicurel
- Headquarters: Cairo, Egypt
- Number of locations: 820 (2024)
- Key people: Essam Eldin Elwakil (Chairman); Hisham Okasha (CEO)
- Services: Financing
- Net income: EGP 186 billion (2024) (USD 3,5 billion)
- Total assets: EGP 4,2 trillion (2024) (USD 78 billion)
- Total equity: EGP 346 billion (2024) (USD 6,4 billion)
- Number of employees: 25 000 (2024)
- Website: www.banquemisr.com

Banque Misr S.A.E. (Egyptian Arabic: بنك مصر ش.م.م.) is a major Egyptian bank, one of Egypt's big five banks. Founded in 1920, the bank has branch offices in all of Egypt's governorates, and currency exchange and work permit offices for foreign workers in Egypt. It was co-founded by economist Talaat Harb Pasha, industrialist Joseph Aslan Cattaui Pasha and Joseph Cicurel. The government of the United Arab Republic nationalized the bank in 1960.

== History ==
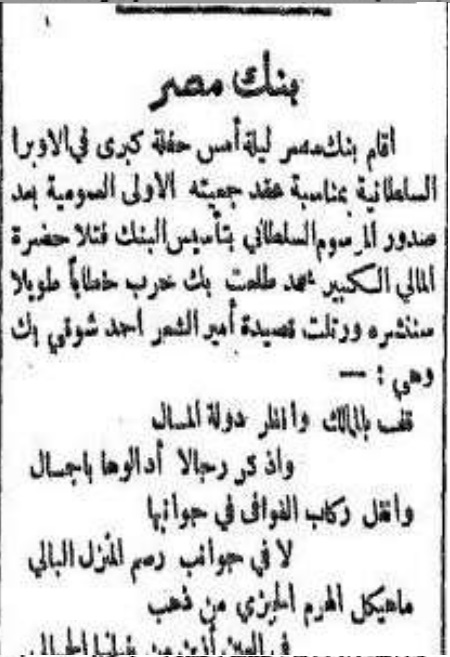
A newspaper article on Banque Misr, 1920s.

The idea of a national bank of Egypt dates to at least the days of Muhammad Ali, who ordered the establishment of a bank with 700,000 piastres shortly before he became ill and died. Amin Shumayyil wrote an article in favor of the idea on April 26, 1879 in the newspaper Al-Tijara; although a number of Egyptian dignitaries met to discuss the project, the conflict between the Khedive Isma'il Pasha and the National Assembly and subsequent ʻUrabi revolt doomed the idea this time. Revolt leader Ahmed ʻUrabi's friend Wilfrid Scawen Blunt reports in his memoirs that Urabi had envisioned a “credit bank” for farmers.

Omar Lotfy Bey, a member of the Watani Party and Vice-President of the School of Law (now part of Cairo University) revived the idea in lectures at the Universities’ Club beginning on November 1, 1908, but his suggestions of using German and Italian assistance and credit were politically controversial.

Joseph Cattaui and Talaat Harb co-founded Banque Misr in 1920. Talaat had published books in 1907 and 1911 calling for the founding of a national bank with Egyptian financing. (The National Bank of Egypt was British-owned, and all the other banks in Egypt were owned by foreigners.) Harb modeled Banque Misr's operations on those of Deutsche Orientbank with which he was familiar due to his friendship with the owner of a Sephardi Jewish bank, Banque Suarès. Harb established Banque Misr and its companies on the basis of certain concepts: all its dealings were in Arabic, Egyptians operated the bank, and the bank restricted share ownership to Egyptian citizens. Misr's Board of Directors included a number of Sephardic Jews and a Coptic Christian.

In 1926-1927 Banque Misr established its first foreign subsidiary, Banque Misr-France, to serve Egyptian tourists to France. Its Paris office was on 101-103 rue des Petits-Champs, now 33-35 rue Danielle Casanova, with registered address across the block on 24 Place Vendôme. Four years later, Banque Misr joined with Banque Essadine, in Lebanon, to form the joint-venture Banque Misr-Syrie-Liban. This bank then absorbed Banque Ezzeddine & Adib (Izz al-Din) in Tripoli.

In 1939, Banque Misr overextended itself and was reconstructed under new leadership. Talaat Harb Pasha was replaced by Hafiz Afifi Pasha.

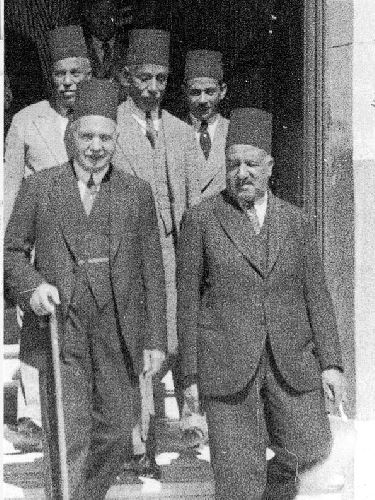
Talaat Harb and Medhat Yakan at the opening of a new branch of Banque Misr in 1935.

In 1960 Gamal Nasser nationalised all banks in Egypt, foreign and domestic, including the four largest domestic banks — National Bank of Egypt, Banque Misr, Alexbank and Banque du Caire. The next year, Syria nationalized all banks operating in the country, including Banque Misr's operations there.

- 1963 In Libya, Banque Misr created Nahda Arabian Bank to hold its branches there.
- 1971 Banque Misr absorbed Banque de Port-Said. Banque de Port-Said had been created in 1960 to hold the Egyptian operations of several foreign banks, including Banque Belge et Internationale en Egypte and Bank of Tokyo. In 1964 it also absorbed Bank Al-Goumhouria, which in 1956 had taken over the Egyption operations of the Ionian Bank and Ottoman Bank.
- 1975 Liberalization of foreign entry led several Egyptian banks to establish joint venture banks with foreign banks.
- 1976 Banque Misr established Misr International Bank (MIBank) with Banque Misr owning 44%, First Chicago 20%, Europartners 10.5%, UBAF Bank 8.5%, Banco di Roma 7.375%, and Mitsui Bank 2.625%.

Misr established Misr American International Bank (MAIB) with Bank of America.
Misr established Misr Exterior Bank in a joint venture with Banco Exterior de España.

- 1977 Bank MISR established Misr Romanian Bank, together with a number of Romanian banks. Misr initially owned 51%, with Banca Romana de Comert Exterior owning 19%, and other Romanian banks such as Banca Agricola and Banca Comerciala Romana owning the rest.
- 1988 Banque du Caire took a 17% in MIBank, and Misr took over First Chicago's 20% stake.
- 1995 Banque Misr joined with Alexbank, National Bank of Egypt, Banque du Caire and Kato Aromatics to found Cairo International Bank in Uganda.
- 1996 MIBank sold 10% of its shares to the Egyptian public in an initial public offering. The remaining shareholders were Misr with some 55%, Banca di Roma International (10%), British Arab Commercial Bank (8.5%), Commerzbank and Banco Central Hispano Americano (jointly 7.875%) and Sakura Bank (2.625%).
- 2004 Banque Misr merged in Misr Exterior Bank.
- 2005 National Société Générale Bank (NSGB), a joint venture between National Bank of Egypt and France's Société Générale, acquired a majority stake in Misr International Bank (MIBank), making NSGB Egypt's biggest private sector bank. Arab African International Bank (AAIB) acquired Misr America International Bank (MAIB). Lebanon's Blom Bank increased its stake in Romanian-Egyptian joint venture Misr Romania Bank to 97% by purchasing an 84% stake.

=== Banque Misr Wallet ===
In March 2017, Banque Misr launched its online banking services for electronic payment over a mobile phone. The Wallet can be used to deposit and withdraw money in accounts, transfer from one enabled account to another, pay utility bills, charge companies’ balance, donate, pay fines, receive wire transfers, and pay for purchases from approved merchants.

== International operations ==
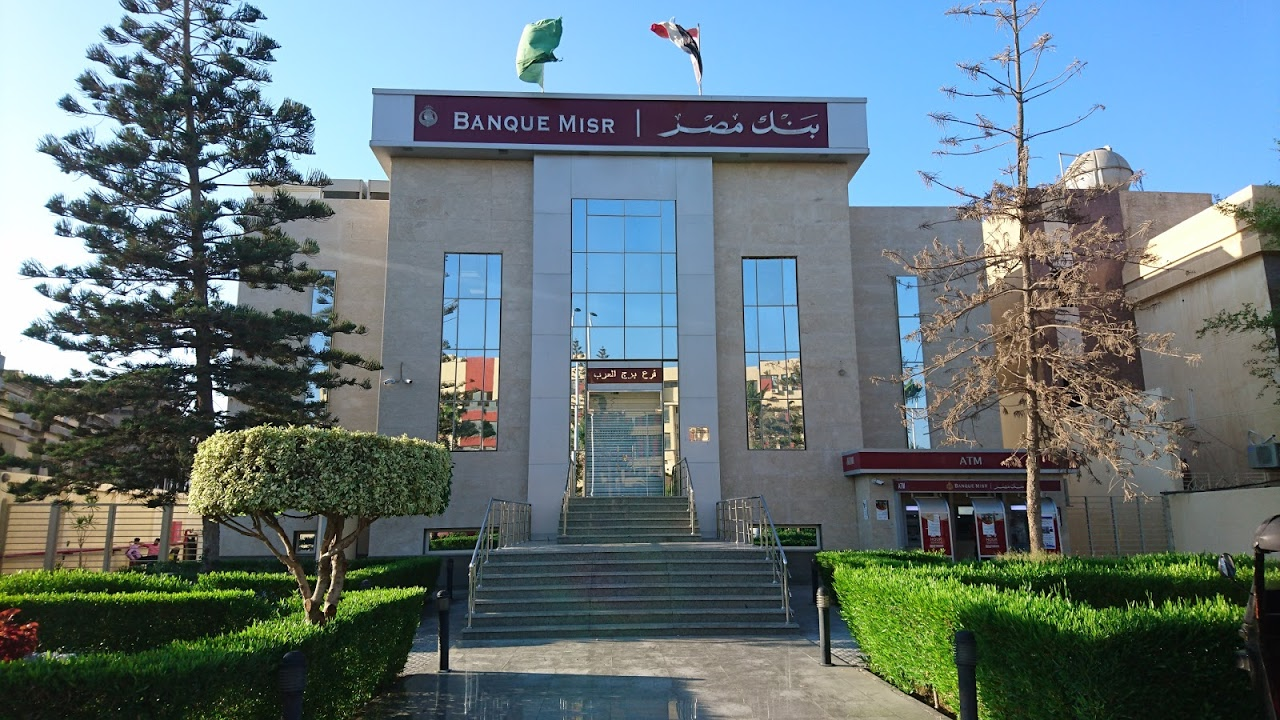
A branch in the city of New Borg El Arab, Alexandria

The bank has representative offices in Johannesburg, Paris and London.

- United Arab Emirates: Established in 1974 as Banque du Caire, the division's name was changed in 2008 to match the main bank. There are 5 branches in the Emirates.
- Lebanon: Banque Misr is one of the oldest banks active in Lebanon, founded in 1929, and has 18 branches throughout the country with capital of £L100 billion.
- Saudi Arabia: On April 6, 2021, the Saudi Cabinet licensed Banque Misr to open a branch in the Kingdom.

== Sanctions ==
In August 2026 during Operation Economic Outcast United States Treasury issued sanctions on the bank in order for it to be forced to comply with anti-Iranian regime secondary sanctions.

== See also ==
- List of largest banks in Africa
