= Talaat Harb =

Egyptian entrepreneur

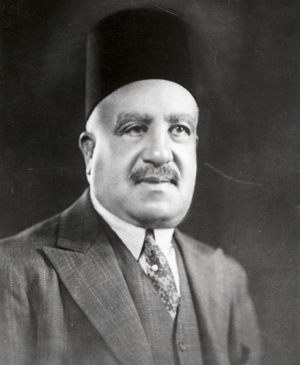
- Talaat Harb Pasha
- Born: 25 November 1867
- Died: 13 August 1941 (aged 73)
- Occupation: Economist
- Known for: founder of Banque Misr

Mohamed Talaat Harb Pacha (Arabic: محمد طلعت حرب باشا; 25 November 1867 – 13 August 1941) was a leading Egyptian entrepreneur and founder of Banque Misr, and its group of companies, in May 1920.

== His works ==
The establishment of Banque Misr, the first real Egyptian bank owned by Egyptian shareholders and staffed by Egyptian nationals, where Arabic (the national language) was used in all communications, was a major step in establishing a national economic identity.

The idea of establishing Banque Misr first emerged in 1907. He was a renowned nationalist industrialist, he published a book calling for the founding of a national bank with financing the Egyptian economy. He called attention to the idle funds invested by foreigners for purposes other than the interests of Egypt. He continued advocating this call on all occasions, with untiring persistence. Harb co-founded a newspaper, Al Jarida, which was the official organ of the Umma Party. In 1911, he published another book titled "The Egyptian Economic Reform and the Nation's Bank Project ", where he explained his economic idea.

In recognition of the importance of spreading banking awareness within and outside Egypt, the bank sought to spread its branches all over the country and in several states: Lebanon, Syria, Sudan, Yemen and Saudi Arabia.

In 1907, Talaat Harb contributed 100 EGP to the establishment of Al Ahly SC

The bank, under the leadership of Talaat Harb, established a number of companies operating in various sectors, such as: textiles, shipping, publishing, movie making, insurance and the first national airline: Egypt Air.

He had many roles in many modern Egyptian economic crisis and incidents like Kom Ombo sugar crisis and the likes of cotton trading.

After the declaration of the Republic in Egypt, Talaat Harb was honored by naming several streets and squares in Cairo and other cities after him. His statue adorns Talaat Harb square in downtown Cairo. In 1980, on the occasion of the sixtieth anniversary of Banque Misr, the late President Anwar Sadat, awarded Talaat Harb posthumously Order of The Nile, which is the highest-ranking of all Egyptian decorations. It is granted exclusively to kings, heads of state and those who rendered great services on a national or human level in general.

He also initiated many economic projects in Saudi Arabia for which he was acknowledged by presenting two pieces of the Kiswa of Kabaa by HM King Abdul-‘Aziz Al-Sa‘ud of Saudi Arabia in 1936. In 2002 the two Kiswa pieces were donated by his grandchildren to a museum.

== Personal life ==
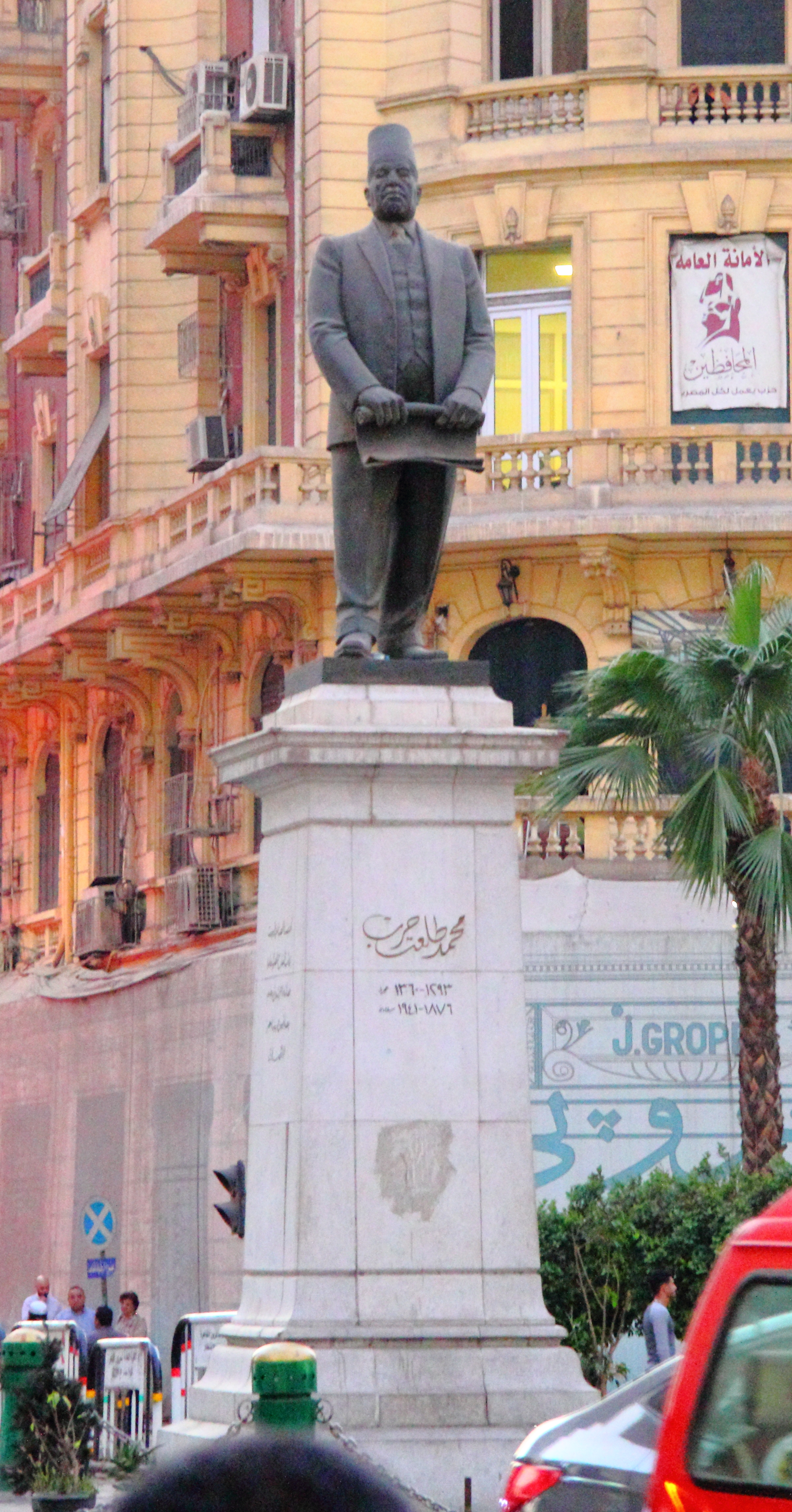
Statue of the famous banker in Downtown Cairo at the square and the street that were both named after him

Talaat Harb lost his wife at a relatively early age. He was survived by his four daughters: Fatma, Aisha, Khadiga and Hoda (Before her death she donated a piece of land and money to build an academic cardiac institute at Ain Shams Faculty of medicine).

He was commemorated in the writings and poems of the then poet laureate Ahmed Shawqi, Abbās al-Aqqād, Ihsan Abdel Quddous, Salah Gawdat and the Lebanese-American Kahlil Gibran.

== Projects established by Talaat Harb ==
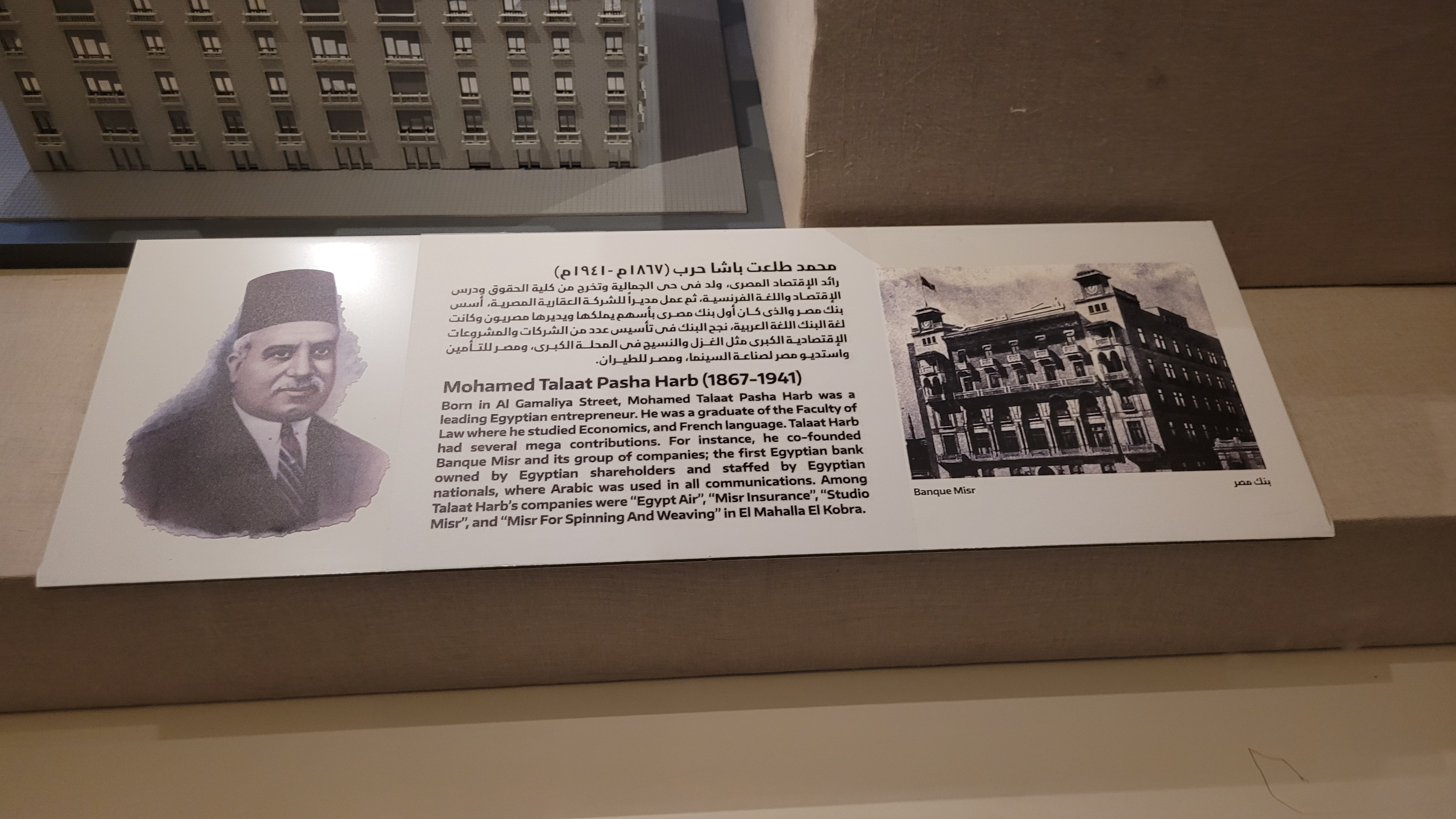
Plaque to Harb in the National Museum of Egyptian Civilization

Some of them are presented in this list:

- 1907: Al-Ahly (The National) Sporting Club (by giving credit to the club foundation committee.
- 1920: Banque Misr; capital LE80,000
- 1922: Misr Printing House; capital LE5,000
- 1923: The Egyptian Company for Paper Manufacture; capital LE30,000
- 1923: Misr Company for Cotton Ginning; capital LE30,000
- 1925: Misr Company for Acting and Cinema (ahead of creating the Studio Misr); capital LE15,000
- 1926: The Egyptian Real Estate Co.; capital LE116,000
- 1926: Egypt-France Bank; capital 5 million F. Francs
- 1927: Misr Weaving Co.; capital LE300,000
- 1927: Misr Fishery Co.; capital LE20,000
- 1927: Misr Silk Weaving Co.; capital LE10,000
- 1927: Misr Linen Co.; capital LE45,000
- 1929: Egypt-Syria Bank; capital one million Syrian Lira
- 1930: Misr Transport and Shipping Co.; capital LE160,000
- 1932: Egyptian Products Sale Co.; capital LE5,000
- 1932: Misr Air Co.; capital LE40,000
- 1934: Egypt Travel Co., capital LE7,000
- 1934: The Egyptian Company for Leather and Tanning
- 1935: Misr for Mines and Quarries Co.; capital LE40,000
- 1937: Misr for the Manufacture and Trade of Oil; capital LE30,000
- 1938: Misr al-Beida for Dyeing, in co-operation with Bradford, capital LE250,000
- 1940: Egypt Medical Pharmaceuticals, capital LE10,000

== See also ==
- Banque Misr
