= North Korean census =

North Korean census may refer to:

- 1993 North Korean census
- 2008 North Korean census
- 2018 North Korean census

== See also ==
- Central Bureau of Statistics (North Korea)
