= 1993 census =

1993 census may refer to:

- 1993 North Korea Census
- 1993 Peru Census
