= Ethnic groups in Korea =

Ethnic groups in Korea may refer to:

- Ethnic groups in North Korea
- Ethnic groups in South Korea
