= Demographics of North Korea =

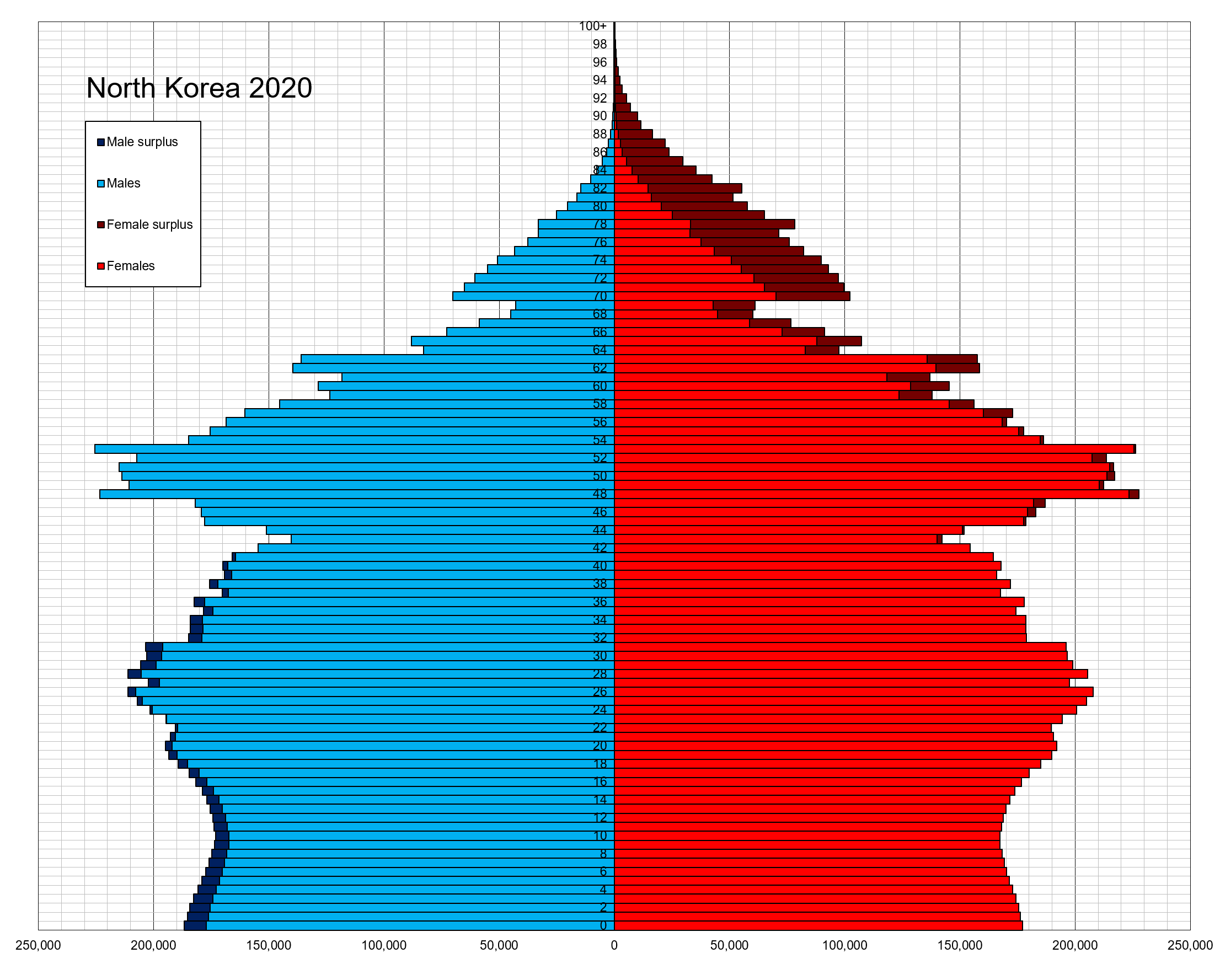
- North Korea population pyramid in 2020
- Population: 25.97 million (2021)
- Density: 199.54 inhabitants / km^{2}. (2008)
- Growth rate: 0.84% (1993–2008)
- Birth rate: 14.35 births/1,000 population (2021 est.)
- Death rate: 9.39 deaths/1,000 population (2021 est.)
- Life expectancy: 71.65 years (2021 est.)
  - male: 67.79 years (2021 est.)
  - female: 75.74 years (2021 est.)
- Fertility rate: 1.8 children born/woman (2022 est.)
- Infant mortality: 22.42 deaths/1,000 live births (2021 est.)
- Net migration rate: Negligible

Age structure
- 0–14 years: 23.19% (2008)
- 15–64 years: 68.09% (2008)
- 65 and over: 8.72% (2008)

Sex ratio
- Total: 0.95 males/1.00 female (2008)
- At birth: 1.04 males/1.00 female (2008)
- Under 15: 1.05 males/1.00 female (2008)
- 65 and over: 0.51 males/1.00 female (2008)

Nationality
- Nationality: Korean(s)
- Major ethnic: Korean (99.998%)
- Minor ethnic: Chinese, Japanese

Language
- Official: Korean (official)

Population of Korea 1910-2015

The demographics of North Korea are determined through national censuses and international estimates. The Central Bureau of Statistics of North Korea conducted the most recent census in 2008, where the population reached 24 million inhabitants. The population density is 199.54 inhabitants per square kilometre, and the 2014 estimated life expectancy is 69.81 years. In 1980, the population rose at a near consistent, but low, rate (0.84% from the two censuses). Since 2000, North Korea's birth rate has exceeded its death rate; the natural growth is positive. In terms of age structure, the population is dominated by the 15–64-year-old segment (68.09%). The median age of the population is 32.9 years, and the gender ratio is 0.95 males to 1.00 female. Since the early 1990s, the birth rate has been fairly stable, with an average of 2 children per woman, down from an average of 3 in the early 1980s.

According to The World Factbook, North Korea is racially homogeneous and contains a small Chinese community and a few ethnic Japanese. The 2008 census listed two ethnicities: Korean (99.998%) and Other (0.002%). Korea was annexed by the Empire of Japan in 1910, in which the Korean Peninsula was occupied by Japanese. In 1945, when Japan was defeated in World War II, Korea was divided into two occupied zones: north occupied by the Soviet Union and the south by the United States. Negotiations on unification failed, and in 1948 two separate countries were formed: North and South Korea.

Korean is the official language of North Korea. The World Factbook states "traditionally Buddhist and Confucianist, some Christian and syncretic Chondogyo" in regards to religion, but also states "autonomous religious activities now almost nonexistent; government-sponsored religious groups exist to provide illusion of religious freedom". As of 2008, 8.86% of the population older than 5 years old have attained academic degrees. In 2000, North Korea spent 38.2% of its expenditures on education, social insurance, and social security. Estimates show that, in 2012, gross domestic product (GDP) per capita was $1,800. The most significant sources of employment were machine building and manufacturing of metallurgical products, military products, and textiles. In 2006, the unemployment rate was between 14.7% and 36.5%. The 2008 census enumerated 5,887,471 households, averaging 3.9 persons per house. Average urbanization rate was 60.3% in 2011.

During the North Korean famine of 1994–1998 somewhere between 240,000 and 3,500,000 North Koreans died from starvation or hunger-related illnesses, with the deaths peaking in 1997. A 2011 U.S. Census Bureau report put the likely number of excess deaths during 1993 to 2000 at from 500,000 to 600,000.

== History of reporting demographics ==
Historical population of North Korea
Year	Pop.	±% p.a.
1940	8,510,000	—
1944	9,250,000	+2.11%
1946	9,260,000	+0.05%
1949	9,620,000	+1.28%
1953	9,360,000	−0.68%
1960	10,790,000	+2.05%
1963	11,570,000	+2.35%
1993	21,213,478	+2.04%
2008	24,052,231	+0.84%
Note: North Korea was liberated in 1945 and formally declared a country in 1948. Source: Nick Eberstadt, Central Bureau of Statistics

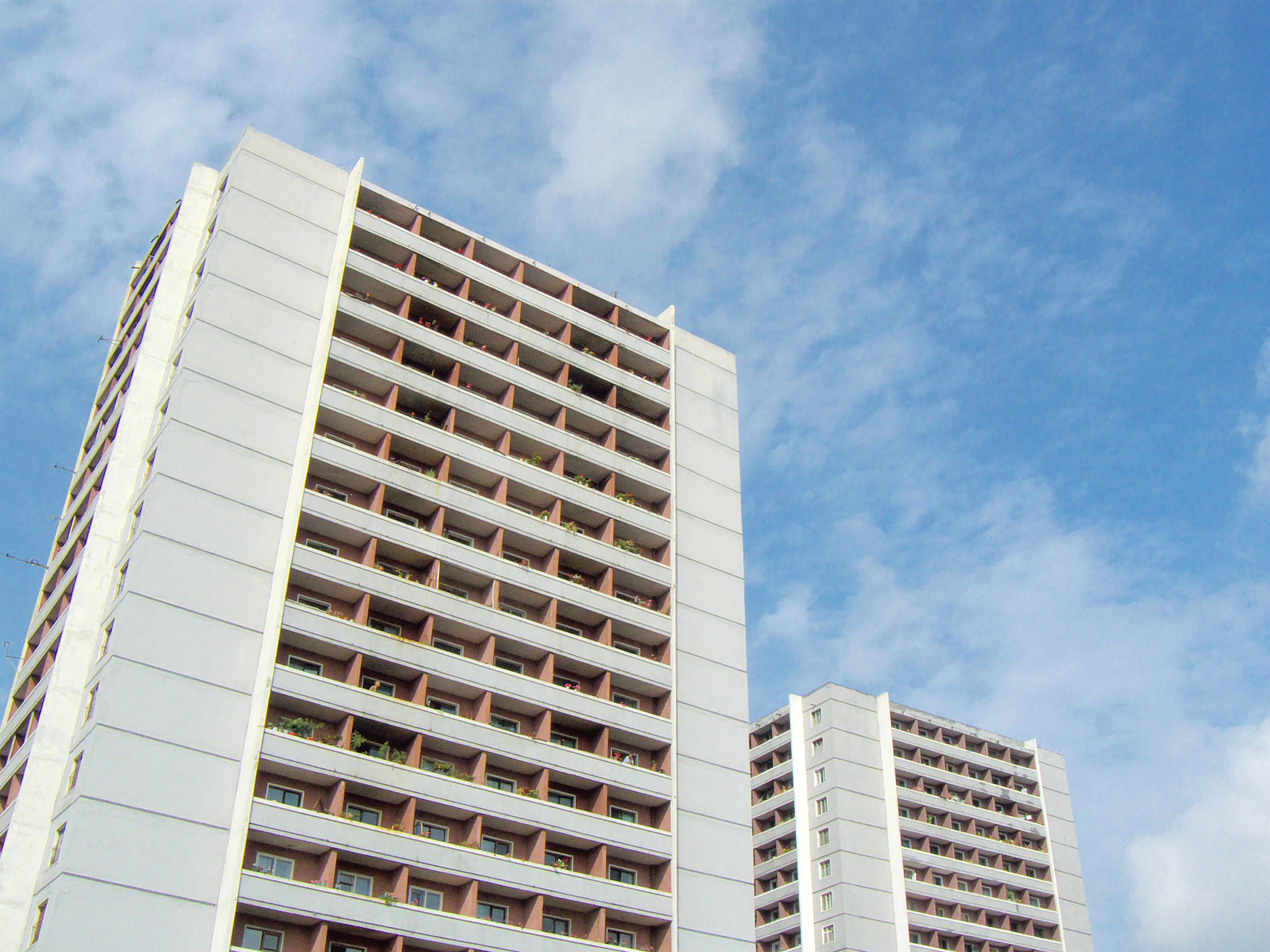
Pyongyang apartment blocks in September 2008.

Until the release of official data in 1989, the 1963 edition of the North Korea Central Yearbook was the last official publication to disclose population figures. After 1963, demographers used varying methods to estimate the population. They either totaled the number of delegates elected to the Supreme People's Assembly (each delegate representing 50,000 people before 1962 and 30,000 people afterward) or relied on official statements that a certain number of persons, or percentage of the population, was engaged in a particular activity. Thus, on the basis of remarks made by President Kim Il Sung in 1977 concerning school attendance, the population that year was calculated at 17.2 million persons. During the 1980s, health statistics, including life expectancy and causes of mortality, were gradually made available to the outside world.

In 1989, the Central Bureau of Statistics released demographic data to the United Nations Fund for Population Activities (UNFPA) to secure the UNFPA's assistance in holding North Korea's first nationwide census since the establishment of the DPRK in 1946. Although the figures given to the United Nations (UN) might have been purposely distorted, it appears that in line with other attempts to open itself to the outside world, the North Korean regime has also opened somewhat in the demographic realm. Although the country lacks trained demographers, accurate data on household registration, migration, and births and deaths are available to North Korean authorities.

According to the United States scholar Nicholas Eberstadt and demographer Judith Banister, vital statistics and personal information on residents are kept by agencies on the ri, or ni (Korean: 리; Hanja: 里: village, the local administrative unit) level in rural areas and the dong (동; 洞: district or block) level in urban areas.

The next census was scheduled for 2018, but was cancelled.

== Size and growth rate ==
In their 1992 monograph, The Population of North Korea, Eberstadt and Banister use the data given to the UNFPA and make their own assessments. They place the total population at 21.4 million persons in mid-1990, consisting of 10.6 million males and 10.8 million females. This figure is close to an estimate of 21.9 million persons for mid-1988 cited in the 1990 edition of the Demographic Yearbook published by the UN. Korean Review, a book by Pang Hwan-ju published by the Foreign Languages Publishing House in 1987, gives a figure of 19.1 million persons for 1986.

=== Male-female ratio ===
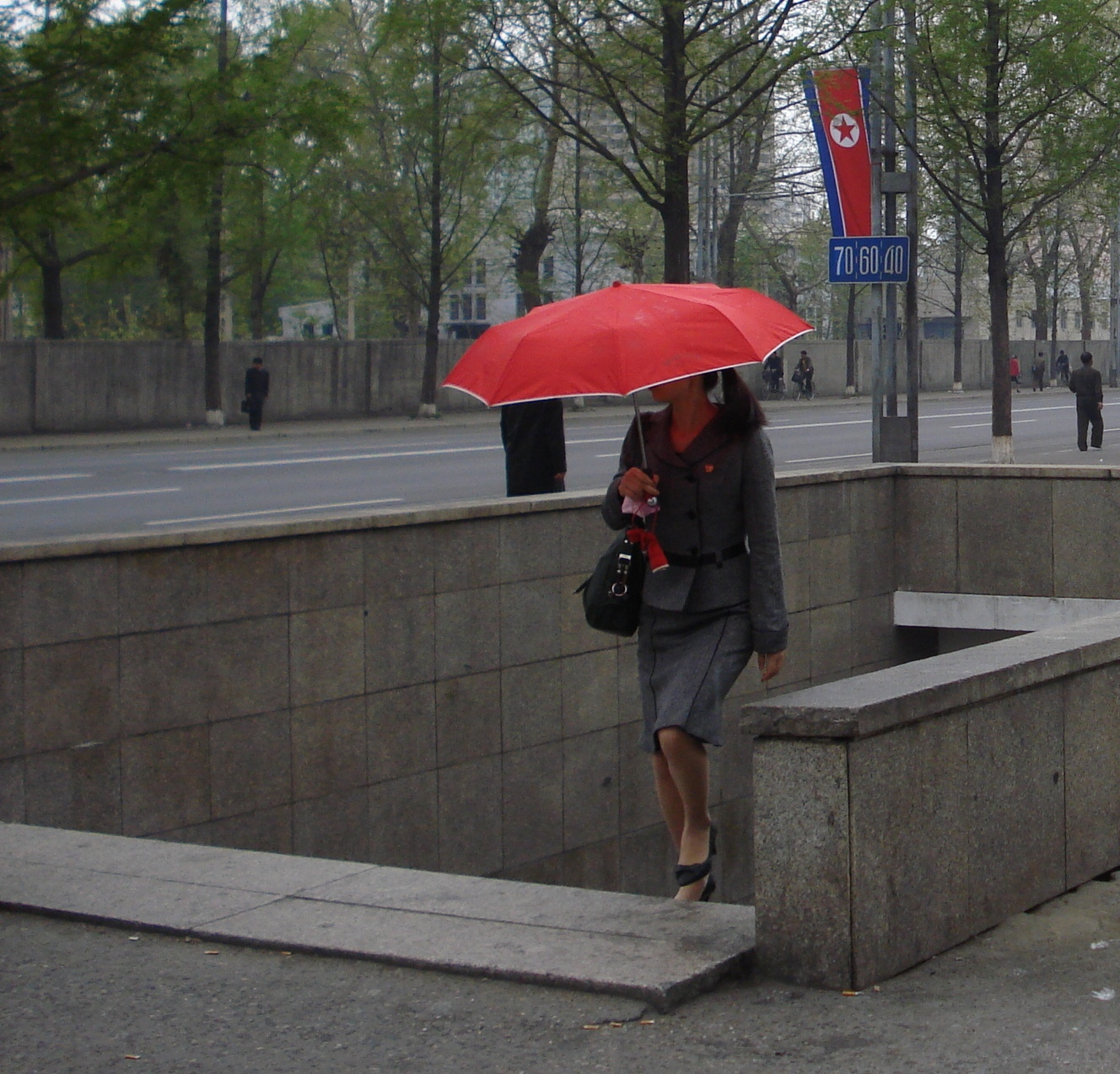
A North Korean woman walking in Pyongyang.

The figures disclosed by the government reveal an unusually low proportion of males to females: in 1980 and 1987, the male-to-female ratios were 86.2 to 100, and 84.2 to 100, respectively. Low male-to-female ratios are usually the result of a war, but these figures were lower than the sex ratio of 88.3 males per 100 females recorded for 1953, the last year of the Korean War. The male-to-female ratio would be expected to rise to a normal level with the passage of years, as happened between 1953 and 1970, when the figure was 95.1 males per 100 females. After 1970, however, the ratio declined. Eberstadt and Banister suggest that before 1970 male and female population figures included the whole population, yielding ratios in the ninetieth percentile, but that after that time the male military population was excluded from population figures.

Based on the figures provided by the Central Statistics Bureau, Eberstadt and Banister estimate that the actual size of the "hidden" male North Korean military had reached 1.2 million by 1986 and that the actual male-to-female ratio was 97.1 males to 100 females in 1990. If their estimates are correct, 6.1 percent of North Korea's total population was in the military, numerically the world's fourth largest active military force as of 2021.

A survey in 2017 found that the famine had skewed North Korea's demography, impacting particularly on male infants. Women aged 20–24 made up 4% of the population, while men in the same age group made up only 2.5%.

=== Growth rate ===
The annual population growth rate in 1960 was 2.7 percent, rising to a high of 3.6 percent in 1970, and falling to 1.9 percent in 1975. This fall reflected a dramatic decline in the fertility rate: the average number of children born to women decreased from 6.5 in 1966 to 2.5 in 1988. Assuming the data is reliable, reasons for falling growth rates and fertility rates probably include late marriage, urbanization, limited housing space, and the expectation that women would participate equally in work hours in the labor force. The experience of other socialist countries suggests that widespread labor force participation by women is often in addition with more traditional role expectations; in other words, they are still responsible for housework and childrearing. The high percentage of males age 17 to 26 may have contributed to the low fertility rate.

According to Eberstadt and Banister's data, the annual population growth rate in 1991 was 1.9 percent. However, the CIA World Factbook estimated that North Korea's annual population growth rate was 1.0% in 1991 and that it has since declined to 0.4% by 2009.

=== Promoting population growth ===
The North Korean government seems to perceive its population as too small in relation to that of South Korea. In its public pronouncements, Pyongyang has called for accelerated population growth and encouraged large families. According to one Korean American scholar who visited North Korea in the early 1980s, the country has no birth control policies; parents are encouraged to have as many as six children. The state provides tagaso (nurseries) to lessen the burden of childrearing for parents and offers a 77-day paid leave after childbirth.

Eberstadt and Banister suggest, however, that authorities at the local level make contraceptive information readily available to parents and that intrauterine devices are the most commonly adopted birth control method. An interview with a former North Korean resident in the early 1990s revealed that such devices are distributed free at clinics.

== Population structure and projections ==
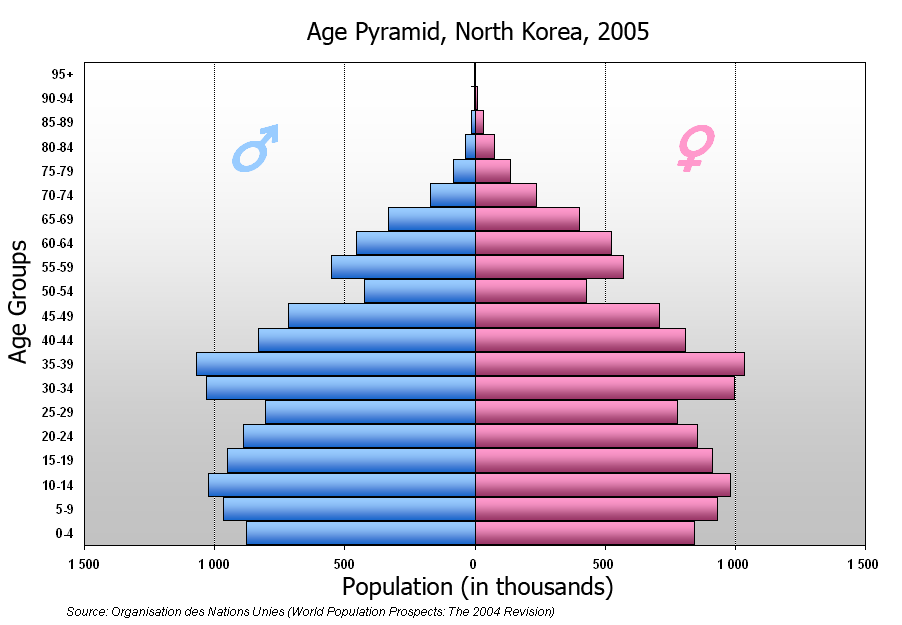
Population pyramid of North Korea

Demographers determine the age structure of a given population by dividing it into five-year age-groups and arranging them chronologically in a pyramid-like structure that "bulges" or recedes in relation to the number of persons in a given age cohort. Many poor, developing countries have a broad base and steadily tapering higher levels, which reflects a large number of births and young children but much smaller age cohorts in later years as a result of relatively short life expectancies. North Korea does not entirely fit this pattern; data reveal a "bulge" in the lower ranges of adulthood. In 1991, life expectancy at birth was approximately 66 years for males, almost 73 for females.

It is likely that annual population growth rates will increase, as well as difficulties in employing the many young men and women entering the labor force in a socialist economy already suffering from stagnant growth. Eberstadt and Banister project that the population will stabilize (that is, cease to grow) at 34 million persons in 2045 and will then experience a gradual decline.

== Settlement patterns and urbanization ==
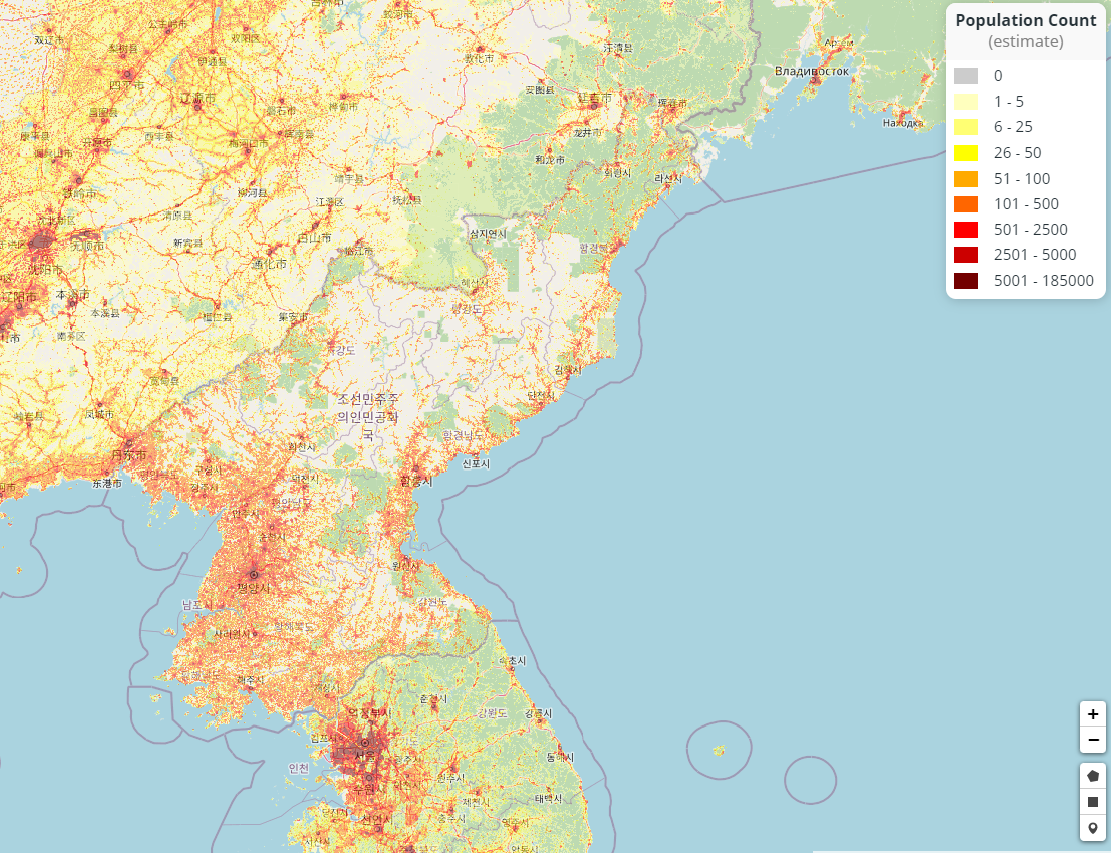
Population density of North Korea (2022)

North Korea's population is concentrated in the plains and lowlands. The least populated regions are the mountainous Chagang and Yanggang provinces adjacent to the Chinese border. The largest concentrations of population are in North Pyongan and South Pyongan provinces, in the municipal district of Pyongyang, and in South Hamgyong Province, which includes the Hamhung-Hungnam urban area. Eberstadt and Banister calculate the average population density at 167 persons per square kilometer, ranging from 1,178 persons per square kilometer in Pyongyang Municipality to 44 persons per square kilometer in Yanggang Province. By contrast, South Korea had an average population density of 425 persons per square kilometer in 1989.

Like South Korea, North Korea has experienced significant urban migration since the end of the Korean War. Official statistics reveal that 59.6 percent of the total population was classified as urban in 1987. This figures compares with only 17.7 percent in 1953. It is not entirely clear, however, what standards are used to define urban populations. Eberstadt and Banister suggest that although South Korean statisticians do not classify settlements of under 50,000 as urban, their North Korean counterparts include settlements as small as 20,000 in this category. And, in North Korea, people who engage in agricultural pursuits inside municipalities sometimes are not counted as urban.

Urbanization in North Korea seems to have proceeded most rapidly between 1953 and 1960, when the urban population grew between 12 and 20 percent annually. Subsequently, the increase slowed to about 6 percent annually in the 1960s and between 1 and 3 percent from 1970 to 1987.

In 1987, North Korea's largest cities were Pyongyang, with approximately 2.3 million inhabitants; Hamhung, 701,000; Chongjin, 520,000; Nampo, 370,000; Sunchon, 356,000; and Sinuiju, 289,000. In 1987, the total national population living in Pyongyang was 11.5 percent. The government restricts and monitors migration to cities and ensures a relatively balanced distribution of population in provincial centers in relation to Pyongyang.

== Vital statistics ==
=== United Nations estimates ===
Source: Population Division of the United Nations Department of Economic and Social Affairs

Year	Mid-year population	Live births	Deaths	Natural change	Crude birth rate (per 1000)	Crude death rate (per 1000)	Natural change (per 1000)	Total Fertility rate	Infant mortality (per 1000)	Life expectancy
1950	11,103,000	451,000	843,000	-391,000	40.3	75.2	-34.9	4.99	242.2	13.82
1951	10,558,000	244,000	589,000	-345,000	23.0	55.6	-32.5	2.60	211.5	17.67
1952	10,228,000	245,000	267,000	-21,000	23.8	25.9	-2.1	2.61	147.3	32.66
1953	10,148,000	289,000	202,000	87,000	28.3	19.8	8.5	3.08	124.9	39.52
1954	10,206,000	331,000	140,000	190,000	32.3	13.7	18.6	3.50	102.6	49.07
1955	10,360,000	355,000	138,000	217,000	34.2	13.3	20.9	3.67	94.4	50.31
1956	10,552,000	352,000	136,000	216,000	33.3	12.8	20.5	3.51	87.7	51.37
1957	10,802,000	438,000	138,000	299,000	40.5	12.8	27.7	4.28	82.7	52.26
1958	11,107,000	453,000	141,000	312,000	40.8	12.7	28.1	4.27	79.3	52.95
1959	11,391,000	396,000	139,000	257,000	34.8	12.2	22.6	3.56	77.1	53.52
1960	11,656,000	410,000	139,000	271,000	35.2	11.9	23.3	3.57	75.8	54.05
1961	11,917,000	389,000	139,000	250,000	32.7	11.6	21.0	3.26	74.9	54.50
1962	12,181,000	418,000	140,000	278,000	34.3	11.5	22.8	3.41	73.9	55.00
1963	12,475,000	453,000	142,000	312,000	36.3	11.4	25.0	3.63	72.3	55.56
1964	12,788,000	455,000	142,000	313,000	35.6	11.1	24.5	3.55	69.9	56.16
1965	13,106,000	465,000	141,000	324,000	35.5	10.8	24.7	3.56	66.8	56.83
1966	13,444,000	493,000	140,000	352,000	36.6	10.4	26.2	3.71	63.0	57.60
1967	13,821,000	543,000	140,000	403,000	39.2	10.1	29.1	4.05	59.1	58.41
1968	14,216,000	525,000	138,000	387,000	37.0	9.7	27.3	3.87	55.4	59.18
1969	14,605,000	526,000	135,000	391,000	36.0	9.3	26.8	3.86	52.0	59.93
1970	14,997,000	525,000	134,000	392,000	35.0	8.9	26.1	3.85	49.1	60.57
1971	15,382,000	509,000	132,000	378,000	33.1	8.6	24.6	3.74	46.6	61.18
1972	15,768,000	526,000	130,000	396,000	33.4	8.3	25.1	3.89	44.4	61.81
1973	16,128,000	450,000	127,000	324,000	28.0	7.9	20.1	3.35	42.3	62.39
1974	16,437,000	417,000	123,000	294,000	25.4	7.5	17.9	3.14	40.5	62.96
1975	16,723,000	400,000	121,000	279,000	23.9	7.2	16.7	3.05	38.7	63.53
1976	16,987,000	367,000	118,000	249,000	21.6	7.0	14.7	2.84	37.0	64.14
1977	17,231,000	356,000	116,000	239,000	20.6	6.8	13.9	2.77	35.6	64.66
1978	17,472,000	357,000	115,000	242,000	20.4	6.6	13.9	2.79	34.2	65.19
1979	17,719,000	366,000	114,000	252,000	20.7	6.5	14.2	2.85	33.0	65.67
1980	17,974,000	371,000	114,000	257,000	20.6	6.3	14.3	2.84	31.9	66.16
1981	18,235,000	379,000	113,000	266,000	20.8	6.2	14.6	2.84	30.8	66.66
1982	18,502,000	380,000	112,000	268,000	20.5	6.1	14.5	2.76	29.6	67.17
1983	18,771,000	382,000	112,000	271,000	20.4	5.9	14.4	2.69	28.4	67.68
1984	19,045,000	388,000	111,000	277,000	20.4	5.8	14.5	2.63	27.3	68.19
1985	19,325,000	395,000	111,000	284,000	20.4	5.7	14.7	2.58	26.5	68.68
1986	19,613,000	402,000	111,000	291,000	20.5	5.6	14.8	2.54	26.2	69.15
1987	19,904,000	402,000	112,000	291,000	20.2	5.6	14.6	2.46	26.7	69.44
1988	20,197,000	409,000	113,000	297,000	20.3	5.6	14.7	2.41	27.6	69.80
1989	20,495,000	412,000	114,000	298,000	20.1	5.6	14.6	2.35	29.5	70.04
1990	20,800,000	427,000	116,000	311,000	20.5	5.6	14.9	2.35	32.1	70.21
1991	21,116,000	440,000	119,000	321,000	20.8	5.6	15.2	2.34	35.5	70.31
1992	21,440,000	447,000	119,000	328,000	20.8	5.6	15.3	2.29	34.6	70.82
1993	21,773,000	453,000	115,000	338,000	20.8	5.3	15.5	2.25	33.7	71.87
1994	22,105,000	457,000	130,000	327,000	20.7	5.9	14.8	2.20	32.8	70.72
1995	22,386,000	458,000	221,000	238,000	20.5	9.9	10.6	2.16	64.4	60.89
1996	22,614,000	452,000	226,000	227,000	20.0	10.0	10.0	2.11	63.2	60.96
1997	22,827,000	438,000	231,000	207,000	19.2	10.1	9.1	2.03	62.3	60.97
1998	23,024,000	431,000	238,000	193,000	18.7	10.3	8.4	2.01	61.6	60.91
1999	23,204,000	421,000	245,000	176,000	18.1	10.6	7.6	1.99	60.9	60.80
2000	23,367,000	407,000	251,000	156,000	17.4	10.8	6.7	1.97	60.1	60.76
2001	23,513,000	399,000	258,000	141,000	17.0	11.0	6.0	1.98	59.2	60.75
2002	23,638,000	380,000	263,000	116,000	16.1	11.1	4.9	1.94	58.0	60.79
2003	23,782,000	363,000	188,000	176,000	15.3	7.9	7.4	1.91	26.9	69.55
2004	23,949,000	360,000	196,000	164,000	15.1	8.2	6.9	1.96	26.2	69.44
2005	24,101,000	350,000	205,000	145,000	14.5	8.5	6.0	1.96	25.6	69.29
2006	24,236,000	344,000	214,000	130,000	14.2	8.8	5.4	1.96	25.2	69.09
2007	24,357,000	340,000	223,000	117,000	14.0	9.1	4.8	1.96	25.2	68.91
2008	24,469,000	342,000	229,000	114,000	14.0	9.3	4.6	1.98	24.7	68.96
2009	24,582,000	337,000	220,000	117,000	13.7	9.0	4.8	1.95	24.1	69.73
2010	24,686,000	314,000	215,000	99,000	12.7	8.7	4.0	1.81	23.1	70.42
2011	24,784,000	315,000	213,000	102,000	12.7	8.6	4.1	1.81	21.8	70.98
2012	24,888,000	323,000	211,000	112,000	13.0	8.5	4.5	1.84	20.3	71.63
2013	25,002,000	330,000	208,000	122,000	13.2	8.3	4.9	1.86	19.0	72.32
2014	25,126,000	338,000	206,000	132,000	13.5	8.2	5.3	1.89	17.8	72.94
2015	25,258,000	342,000	204,000	138,000	13.4	8.4	5.0	1.86	16.8	72.78
2016	25,390,000	343,000	211,000	132,000	13.5	8.6	4.9	1.86	16.2	72.81
2017	25,516,000	345,000	217,000	128,000	13.5	8.8	4.7	1.85	15.3	72.98
2018	25,638,000	346,000	224,000	122,000	13.4	9.1	4.4	1.83	14.6	73.03
2019	25,755,000	347,000	229,000	119,000	13.4	9.3	4.1	1.83	13.9	73.20
2020	25,867,000	345,000	235,000	110,000	13.4	9.7	3.7	1.82	13.3	73.27
2021	25,972,000	344,000	242,000	102,000	13.3	9.5	3.8	1.81	12.7	73.28
2022	26,300,000	334,000	242,000	92,000	13.1	9.5	3.7	1.80		
2023	26,400,000	335,000	240,000	95,000	12.9	9.7	3.3	1.78		
2024	26,500,000	336,000	250,000	86,000	12.9	9.9	3.0	1.78		
2025					12.6	10.0	2.6	1.77		

== Total and percent distribution of population by single year of age (census 2008) ==
Source: Central Bureau of Statistics

Age	Population	Percent
All Ages	24 052 231	100
0-4	1 710 039	7.1
0	341 461	1.4
1	343 636	1.4
2	340 756	1.4
3	340 640	1.4
4	343 546	1.4
5-9	1 846 785	7.7
5	348 244	1.4
6	358 630	1.5
7	373 460	1.6
8	378 734	1.6
9	387 717	1.6
10-14	2 021 350	8.4
10	381 532	1.6
11	392 860	1.6
12	419 070	1.7
13	417 757	1.7
14	410 131	1.7
15-19	2 052 342	8.5
15	404 916	1.7
16	423 303	1.8
17	411 178	1.7
18	406 934	1.7
19	406 011	1.7
20-24	1 841 400	7.7
20	369 876	1.5
21	369 111	1.5
22	371 307	1.5
23	361 335	1.5
24	369 771	1.5
25-29	1 737 185	7.2
25	347 425	1.4
26	357 745	1.5
27	345 247	1.4
28	347 297	1.4
29	339 471	1.4
30-34	1 680 272	7.0
30	318 969	1.3
31	293 116	1.2
32	316 341	1.3
33	372 776	1.5
34	379 070	1.6
35-39	2 214 929	9.2
35	393 037	1.6
36	476 923	2.0
37	443 996	1.8
38	450 686	1.9
39	450 287	1.9
40-44	2 015 514	8.4
40	438 137	1.8
41	469 165	2.0
42	386 019	1.6
43	368 040	1.5
44	354 153	1.5
45-49	1 559 527	6.5
45	358 695	1.5
46	326 750	1.4
47	286 098	1.2
48	302 970	1.3
49	285 014	1.2
50-54	1 315 101	5.5
50	336 530	1.4
51	335 555	1.4
52	210 429	0.9
53	232 565	1.0
54	200 022	0.8
55-59	902 876	3.8
55	168 575	0.7
56	133 907	0.6
57	136 527	0.6
58	233 448	1.0
59	230 419	1.0
60-64	1 058 263	4.4
60	227 500	0.9
61	220 311	0.9
62	217 186	0.9
63	201 459	0.8
64	191 807	0.8
65-69	913 304	3.8
65	185 316	0.8
66	212 636	0.9
67	184 115	0.8
68	171 146	0.7
69	160 091	0.7
70-74	662 627	2.8
70	177 206	0.7
71	145 067	0.6
72	129 272	0.5
73	114 955	0.5
74	96 127	0.4
75-79	335 467	1.4
75	97 434	0.4
76	78 097	0.3
77	59 180	0.2
78	57 060	0.2
79	43 696	0.2
80-84	132 149	0.5
80	38 439	0.2
81	29 563	0.1
82	25 652	0.1
83	21 636	0.1
84	16 809	0.1
85-89	42 760	0.2
85	12 748	0.1
86	11 389	*
87	9 009	*
88	5 859	*
89	3 755	*
90-94	8 634	*
90	2 972	*
91	2 669	*
92	1 305	*
93	956	*
94	732	*
95-99	1 643	*
95	516	*
96	482	*
97	300	*
98	186	*
99	159	*
100-104	54	*
100	40	*
101	3	*
102	4	*
103	4	*
104	3	*
105-109	8	*
105	1	*
106	2	*
107	2	*
108	1	*
109	2	*
110+	2	*

Age group	Population	Male	Female	Percent
0-14	5 578 174	2 850 503	2 727 671	23.2
15-64	16 377 409	8 159 653	8 217 756	68.2
65+	2 096 648	711 682	1 384 966	8.7

Number of children 0-14	Number of women 15-49	Proportion
5 578 174	6 479 605	0.86088

== North Koreans living overseas ==
Large-scale emigration from Korea began around 1904 and continued until the end of World War II. During the Japanese colonial occupation (1910–1945), many Koreans emigrated to: China (particularly Northeast China), the Soviet Union, Hawaii, and the contiguous United States. People from Korea's northern provinces went primarily to Manchuria, China, and Siberia; many of those from the southern provinces went to Japan. Most emigrants left for economic reasons because employment opportunities were scarce; many Korean farmers had lost their land after the Japanese colonial government introduced a system of private land tenure, imposed higher land taxes, and promoted the growth of an absentee landlord class charging exorbitant rents.

In the 1980s, more than 4 million ethnic Koreans lived outside the peninsula. The largest group, about 1.7 million people, lived in China (see Koreans in China); most had assumed Chinese citizenship. Approximately 1 million Koreans, almost exclusively from South Korea, lived in North America (see Korean Americans). About 389,000 ethnic Koreans resided in the former Soviet Union (see Koryosaram and Sakhalin Koreans). One observer noted that Koreans have been so successful in running collective farms in Soviet Central Asia that being Korean is often associated by other citizens with being rich. As a result, there is growing antagonism against Koreans. Smaller groups of Koreans are found in Central America and South America (85,000), the Middle East (62,000), Europe (40,000), Asia (27,000), and Africa (25,000).

Many of Japan's approximately 680,000 Koreans have below average standards of living. This is partly because of discrimination by the Japanese. Many resident Koreans, loyal to North Korea, remain separate from, and often hostile to, the Japanese social mainstream. The pro-North Korean Chongryon (General Association of Korean Residents in Japan) initially was more successful than the pro-South Korean Mindan (Association for Korean Residents in Japan) in attracting adherents. However, the widening disparity between the political and economic conditions of the two Koreas has since made Mindan the larger and certainly the less politically controversial faction. In addition, third- and fourth-generation Zainichi Chosenjin have largely given up active participation or loyalty to the Chongryon ideology. Reasons stated for this increased disassociation include widespread mainstream tolerance of Koreans by Japanese in recent years, greatly reducing the need to rely on Chongryon and the increasing unpopularity of Kim Jong Il even among loyal members of Chongryon.

Between 1959 and 1982, Chongryon encouraged the repatriation of Korean residents in Japan to North Korea. More than 93,000 Koreans left Japan, the majority (80,000 persons) in 1960 and 1961. Thereafter, the number of repatriates declined, apparently because of reports of hardships suffered by their compatriots. Approximately 6,637 Japanese wives accompanied their husbands to North Korea, of whom about 1,828 retained Japanese citizenship in the early 1990s. Pyongyang had originally promised that the wives could return home every two or three years to visit their relatives. In fact, however, they are not allowed to do so, and few have had contact with their families in Japan. In normalization talks between North Korean and Japanese officials in the early 1990s, the latter urged unsuccessfully that the wives be allowed to make home visits. According to a defector, himself a former returnee, many petitioned to be returned to Japan and in response were sent to political prison camps. Japanese research puts the number of Zainichi Korean returnees condemned to prison camps at around 10,000. In 2026, four people who had repatriated to Korea, been mistreated and subsequently escaped back to Japan won a verdict in a Japanese court ordering the North Korean government to pay them compensation of a minimum of ¥20 million each.

== CIA World Factbook demographic statistics ==
Population, fertility rate and net reproduction rate, United Nations estimates

The following demographic statistics are from the CIA World Factbook, unless otherwise indicated:

Population: 25,115,311 (July 2016 est.)

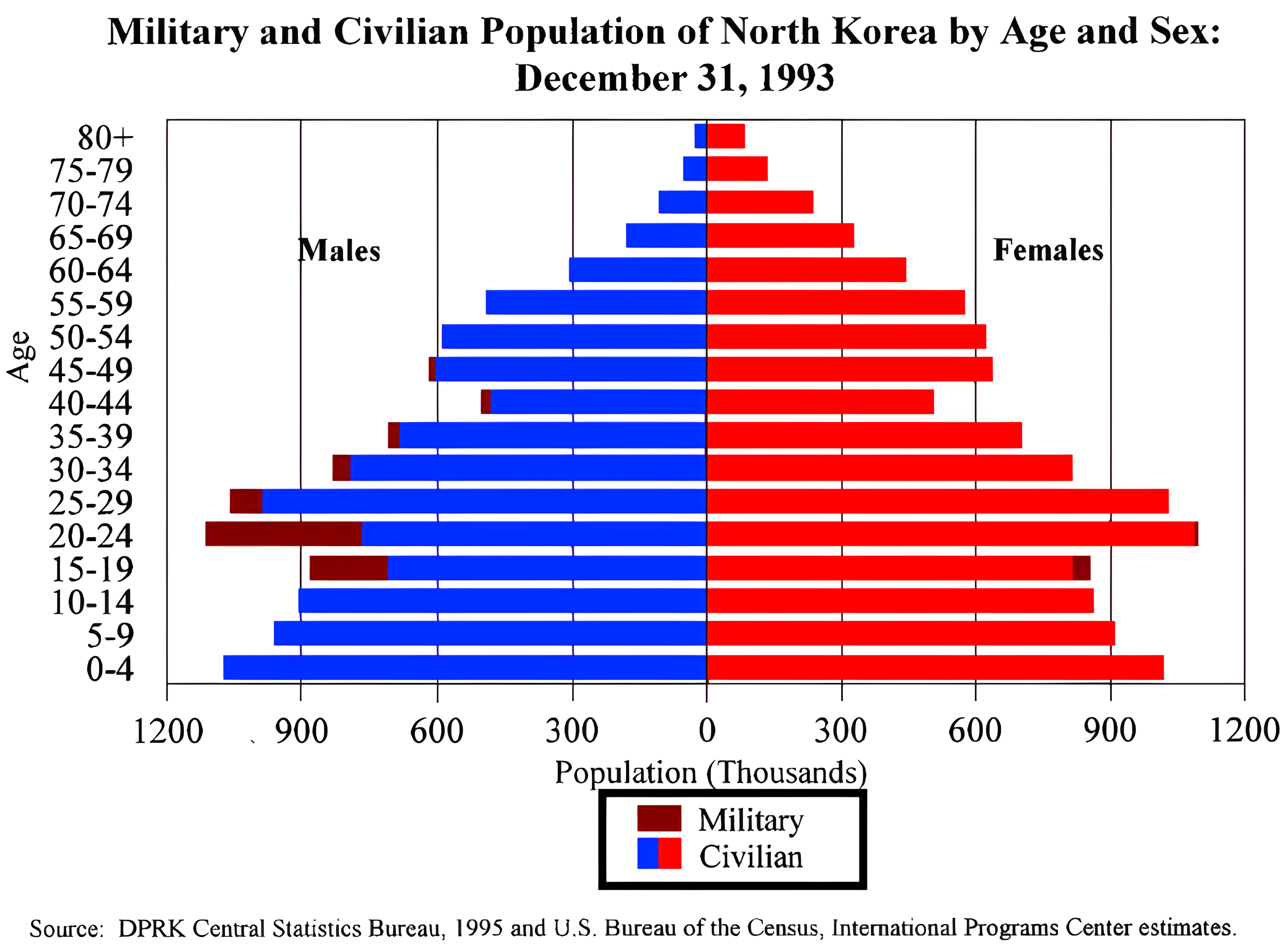
Population pyramid of North Korea as of the 1st National Census on December 31, 1993

Age structure
0–14 years: 20.97% (male 2,678,638/female 2,588,744)
15–24 years: 15.88% (male 2,009,360/female 1,977,942)
25–54 years: 44.22% (male 5,567,682/female 5,537,077)
55–64 years: 9.19% (male 1,090,739/female 1,218,406)
65 years and over: 9.74% (male 840,003/female 1,606,720) (2016 est.)

Population growth rate
1.02% (1991 est.)
0.31% (1996 est.)
0.87% (2006 est.)
0.42% (2009 est.)
0.53% (2016 est.)

Birth rate
20.01 births/1,000 population (1991 est.)
17.58 births/1,000 population (1996 est.)
14.61 births/1,000 population (2006 est.)
14.61 births/1,000 population (2008 est.)
14.60 births/1,000 population (2016 est.)

Death rate
8.94 deaths/1,000 population (1991 est.)
9.52 deaths/1,000 population (1996 est.)
7.29 deaths/1,000 population (2006 est.)
7.29 deaths/1,000 population (2008 est.)
9.30 deaths/1,000 population (2016 est.)

Net migration rate: 0 migrant(s)/1,000 population (2016 est.)

Sex ratio
at birth: 1.05 male(s)/female
0–14 years: 1.03 male(s)/female
15–24 years: 1.02 male(s)/female
25–54 years: 1.01 male(s)/female
55–64 years: 0.9 male(s)/female
65 years and over: 0.53 male(s)/female
total population: 0.94 male(s)/female (2016 est.)

Infant mortality rate
total: 22.9 deaths/1,000 live births (2016 est.)

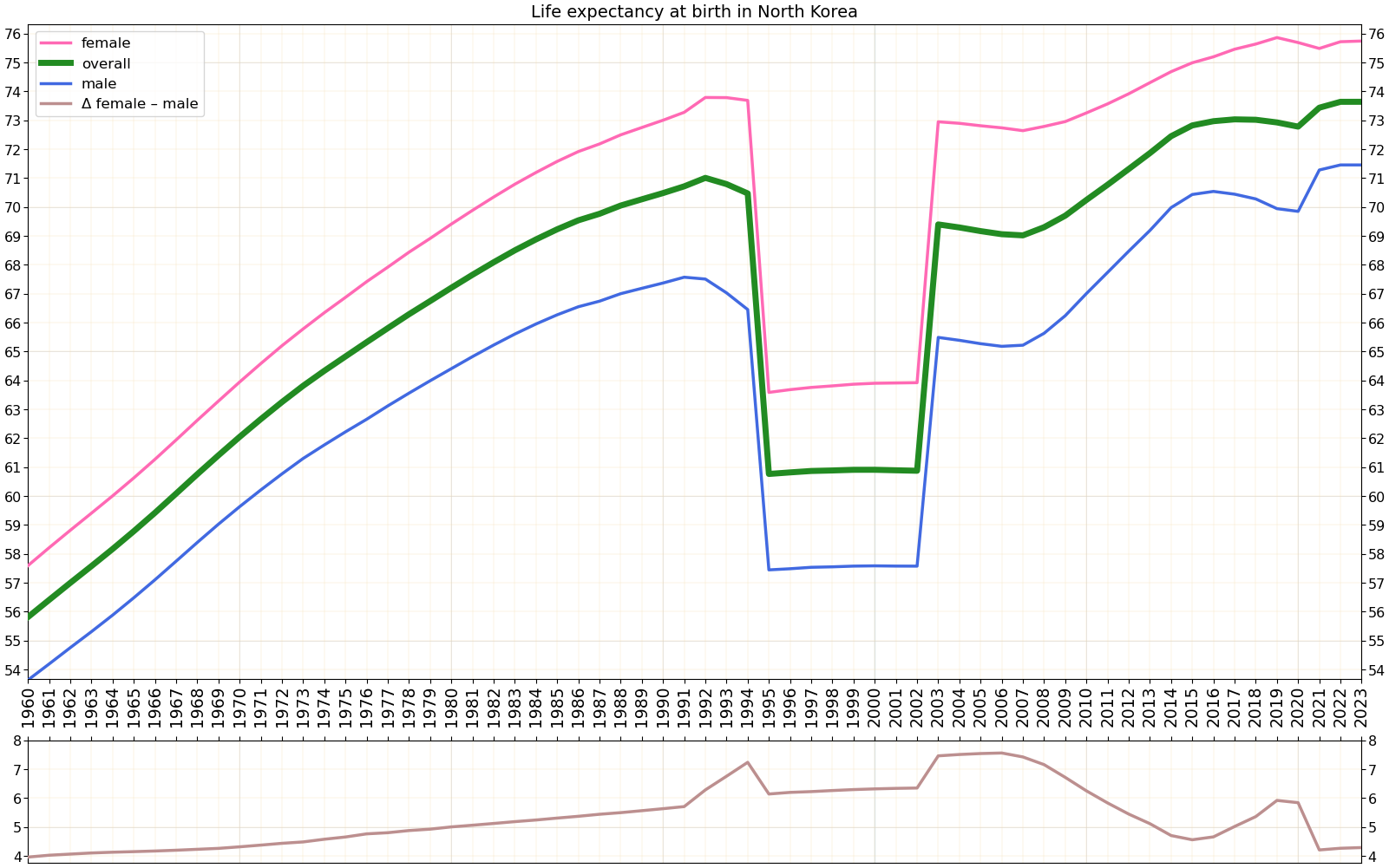
Life expectancy in North Korea

Comparison of life expectancy in North Korea and South Korea

Life expectancy at birth
total population: 70.4 years
male: 66.6 years
female: 74.5 years (2016 est.)

Total fertility rate
2.09 children born/woman (2006 est.)
1.94 children born/woman (2010 est.)
1.96 children born/woman (2016 est.)
1.91 children born/woman (2021 est.)

Nationality
noun: Korean(s)
adjective: Korean

Ethnic groups
racially homogeneous: Koreans; small Chinese community, a few ethnic Russians, ethnic Japanese, Singaporeans, ethnic Thai, Indian, African, Americans and ethnic Vietnamese

Religion: no statistics available; predominantly Buddhism, Shamanism, Confucianism, and Cheondoism (see "religion in North Korea")

Language: Korean

Literacy
definition: age 15 and over can read and write Korean using the Korean script Hangul
total population: 100%
male: 100%
female: 100% (2015 est.)

== See also ==
- 1993 North Korea Census
- 2008 North Korea Census
- Ethnic minorities in North Korea
- Demographics of South Korea

== General and cited references ==
- Central Bureau of Statistics (2009). DPR Korea 2008 Population Census: National Report (PDF) (Report). Central Bureau of Statistics. Archived from the original (PDF) on 14 May 2011.
- Eberstadt, Nicholas; Banister, Judith (1992). The Population of North Korea (PDF). Institute of East Asian Studies, University of California-Berkeley, Center for Korean Studies. ISBN 978-1-55729-030-4.
- Federal Research Division (2007). "Country Profile: North Korea" (PDF). Library of Congress.
- Park, Kyung-Pak, ed. (2010). New Challenges of North Korean Foreign Policy. Palgrave Macmillan. ISBN 9780230113978.
- Yonhap News Agency (2002). North Korea Handbook. M.E. Sharp. ISBN 9780765635235.
