= 2008 North Korean census =

- October 1, 2008

General information
- Country: North Korea
- Authority: Central Bureau of Statistics

Results
- Total population: 24,052,231 (▲13.38%)
- Most populous region: South Pyongan (4,051,696)
- Least populous region: Ryanggang (719,269)

The 2008 North Korean census (2008년 조선민주주의인민공화국 인구일제조사) was the second North Korea national census. The reference day used for the census was October 1, 2008. This census conducted by the Central Bureau of Statistics from 1 to 15 October 2008 throughout the DPRK. The census was taken by house-to-house interviews by enumerators using a census questionnaire. Roughly 35,000 enumerators were trained to help with the census. The population of North Korea was counted as 24,052,231, a 13.38% increase from the 1993 census.

The United Nations Population Fund (UNFPA) funded, delivered and ensured that the census’ quality met international standards. UNFPA population experts trained North Korean personnel, notably DPRK's Central Bureau of Statistics. UNFPA received additional funding from Republic of Korea (ROK) and Switzerland. According to Andrei Lankov, the results of the census are thought of as plausible by foreign observers. The census was widely advertised in propaganda, which resulted in a relatively detailed survey.

The 2008 census is the latest census of North Korea. The next census was scheduled for 2018, but was cancelled after South Korea had stopped funding the project for fear of violating sanctions.

== Introduction ==
North Korea completed its first census in 1993. In October 2006, a declaration was enacted to complete a second census in 2008. In order to test procedures, in October 2007, there was a pilot census completed across each of the provinces where roughly 50,000 households were counted. The actual census took place from October 1–15, 2008 using October 1, 2008 at 1:00 AM as a reference point.

== Questionnaire ==
There were several questions asked on the census broken into three modules:

The first module was titled Household and dwelling unit information. There were 14 questions in this module pertaining to the persons' housing unit. If the respondent lived in an institutional living quarter, then the rest of the section was skipped. All of the questions are listed below:

1. How many are the members of this household?
2. Type of Household
3. What is the class of labor of head of this household?
4. What is the previous class of labor of head of this household?
5. What type of dwelling does this household occupy?
6. Does this household have the first right to occupancy of this dwelling unit?
7. What is the total floor area of this dwelling unit?
8. How many rooms are there in this dwelling unit? (Exclude sitting room, Kitchen)
9. Is there a water tap in this dwelling unit?
10. What is the source of water supply for your household?
11. What kind of toilet facility does your household have access to?
12. What heating system is established in your household?
13. What heating system is used by your household?
14. Which fuel is used for cooking?

The second module was titled personal information and had the most questions of any of the modules. There was a total of 29 questions to be asked including sex, nationality, school level, marital status, and employment.

The third module was titled mortality. The first question was "Did any member of this household die during the period 1 Oct. 2007 to 30 Sept. 2008?" If the answer was no, the rest of this section was skipped. If the answer was yes, then five additional questions were asked. If the deceased person was a female between 15 and 49, five more additional questions were asked. All ten additional questions are listed below.

1. What was/were the name(s) of the household member(s) who died?
2. Sex
3. When was _____ born?
4. When did _____die?
5. How old was ______ when he/she died?
6. Was____ pregnant at the time of her death?
7. Did _______ die while having abortion or miscarriage or within 42 days of having abortion/miscarriage?
8. Did _____ die while giving birth or within 42 days of giving birth?
9. Where did _____die? (Home, Hospital, or Other)
10. Did she have a live birth anytime between 1 Oct. 2007 and the time of death? If "Yes", How many male and female children did she give birth at that time?

== Rankings ==
Population pyramid 2008
| % | Males | Age | Females | % |
|---|---|---|---|---|
| 0.02 | | 85+ | | 0.20 |
| 0.08 | | 80–84 | | 0.47 |
| 0.33 | | 75–79 | | 1.07 |
| 0.95 | | 70–74 | | 1.81 |
| 1.58 | | 65–69 | | 2.22 |
| 1.98 | | 60–64 | | 2.42 |
| 1.76 | | 55–59 | | 1.99 |
| 2.65 | | 50–54 | | 2.82 |
| 3.18 | | 45–49 | | 3.30 |
| 4.18 | | 40–44 | | 4.20 |
| 4.65 | | 35–39 | | 4.56 |
| 3.55 | | 30–34 | | 3.44 |
| 3.69 | | 25–29 | | 3.53 |
| 3.91 | | 20–24 | | 3.74 |
| 4.37 | | 15–19 | | 4.17 |
| 4.30 | | 10–14 | | 4.10 |
| 3.92 | | 5–9 | | 3.76 |
| 3.63 | | 0–4 | | 3.48 |

Population in North Korea by province
| Rank | Province | Population as of 2008 Census |
|---|---|---|
| 1 | South Phyongan | 4,051,696 |
| 2 | Pyongyang | 3,255,288 |
| 3 | South Hamgyong | 3,066,013 |
| 4 | North Phyongan | 2,728,662 |
| 5 | North Hamgyong | 2,327,362 |
| 6 | South Hwanghae | 2,310,485 |
| 7 | North Hwanghae | 2,113,672 |
| 8 | Kangwon | 1,477,582 |
| 9 | Jagang | 1,299,830 |
| 10 | Ryanggang | 719,269 |

=== Population by province, urban/rural, by 5-year age group and sex ===
Source: DPRKorea 2008 Population Census National Report

| By province | By age | 2008 | | | | | | | | |
| By province | By age | All provinces | | | Urban | | | Rural | | |
| By province | By age | Total | Man | Woman | Total | Man | Woman | Total | Man | Woman |
|---|---|---|---|---|---|---|---|---|---|---|
| National | Total | 23,349,859 | 11,059,489 | 12,290,370 | 14,155,393 | 6,716,215 | 7,439,178 | 9,194,466 | 4,343,274 | 4,851,192 |
| National | 0 | 341,461 | 174,268 | 167,193 | 199,007 | 101,587 | 97,420 | 142,454 | 72,681 | 69,773 |
| National | 1-4 | 1,368,578 | 697,905 | 670,673 | 794,602 | 405,438 | 389,164 | 573,976 | 292,467 | 281,509 |
| National | 5-9 | 1,846,785 | 943,048 | 903,737 | 1,074,221 | 549,145 | 525,076 | 772,564 | 393,903 | 378,661 |
| National | 10-14 | 2,021,350 | 1,035,282 | 986,068 | 1,168,423 | 601,684 | 566,739 | 852,927 | 433,598 | 419,329 |
| National | 15-19 | 1,862,996 | 883,962 | 979,034 | 1,131,912 | 543,694 | 588,218 | 731,084 | 340,268 | 390,816 |
| National | 20-24 | 1,441,348 | 555,939 | 885,409 | 884,212 | 350,183 | 534,029 | 557,136 | 205,756 | 351,380 |
| National | 25-29 | 1,649,846 | 801,191 | 848,655 | 1,024,997 | 500,104 | 524,893 | 624,849 | 301,087 | 323,762 |
| National | 30-34 | 1,672,559 | 845,920 | 826,639 | 1,034,546 | 520,674 | 513,872 | 638,013 | 325,246 | 312,767 |
| National | 35-39 | 2,207,104 | 1,110,831 | 1,096,273 | 1,372,573 | 695,278 | 677,295 | 834,531 | 415,553 | 418,978 |
| National | 40-44 | 2,010,254 | 1,000,048 | 1,010,206 | 1,233,232 | 615,179 | 618,053 | 777,022 | 384,869 | 392,153 |
| National | 45-49 | 1,556,339 | 762,940 | 793,399 | 959,811 | 469,458 | 490,353 | 596,528 | 293,482 | 303,046 |
| National | 50-54 | 1,314,088 | 636,756 | 677,332 | 822,746 | 397,004 | 425,742 | 491,342 | 239,752 | 251,590 |
| National | 55-59 | 902,408 | 423,158 | 479,250 | 552,813 | 256,733 | 296,080 | 349,595 | 166,425 | 183,170 |
| National | 60-64 | 1,058,141 | 476,605 | 581,536 | 640,330 | 284,780 | 355,550 | 417,811 | 191,825 | 225,986 |
| National | 65-69 | 913,274 | 379,426 | 533,848 | 559,114 | 230,165 | 328,949 | 354,160 | 149,261 | 204,899 |
| National | 70-74 | 662,617 | 228,276 | 434,341 | 395,860 | 134,204 | 261,656 | 266,757 | 94,072 | 172,685 |
| National | 75-79 | 335,462 | 79,226 | 256,236 | 198,574 | 46,959 | 151,615 | 136,888 | 32,267 | 104,621 |
| National | 80+ | 185,249 | 24,708 | 160,541 | 108,420 | 13,946 | 94,474 | 76,829 | 10,762 | 66,067 |
| Ryanggang Province | Total | 719,269 | 338,705 | 380,564 | 464,690 | 218,834 | 245,856 | 254,579 | 119,871 | 134,708 |
| Ryanggang Province | 0 | 10,332 | 5,278 | 5,054 | 6,411 | 3,282 | 3,129 | 3,921 | 1,996 | 1,925 |
| Ryanggang Province | 1-4 | 41,613 | 21,190 | 20,423 | 25,711 | 13,071 | 12,640 | 15,902 | 8,119 | 7,783 |
| Ryanggang Province | 5-9 | 59,962 | 30,581 | 29,381 | 36,298 | 18,574 | 17,724 | 23,664 | 12,007 | 11,657 |
| Ryanggang Province | 10-14 | 65,934 | 33,791 | 32,143 | 41,623 | 21,383 | 20,240 | 24,311 | 12,408 | 11,903 |
| Ryanggang Province | 15-19 | 59,617 | 28,007 | 31,610 | 38,936 | 18,380 | 20,556 | 20,681 | 9,627 | 11,054 |
| Ryanggang Province | 20-24 | 41,767 | 14,832 | 26,935 | 27,063 | 9,571 | 17,492 | 14,704 | 5,261 | 9,443 |
| Ryanggang Province | 25-29 | 49,593 | 23,826 | 25,767 | 33,026 | 15,798 | 17,228 | 16,567 | 8,028 | 8,539 |
| Ryanggang Province | 30-34 | 50,573 | 25,272 | 25,301 | 33,219 | 16,843 | 16,376 | 17,354 | 8,429 | 8,925 |
| Ryanggang Province | 35-39 | 65,073 | 32,672 | 32,401 | 42,038 | 21,029 | 21,009 | 23,035 | 11,643 | 11,392 |
| Ryanggang Province | 40-44 | 58,951 | 29,391 | 29,560 | 38,567 | 19,263 | 19,304 | 20,384 | 10,128 | 10,256 |
| Ryanggang Province | 45-49 | 46,244 | 22,567 | 23,677 | 30,308 | 14,636 | 15,672 | 15,936 | 7,931 | 8,005 |
| Ryanggang Province | 50-54 | 39,732 | 19,237 | 20,495 | 26,698 | 12,892 | 13,806 | 13,034 | 6,345 | 6,689 |
| Ryanggang Province | 55-59 | 26,951 | 12,753 | 14,198 | 17,634 | 8,392 | 9,242 | 9,317 | 4,361 | 4,956 |
| Ryanggang Province | 60-64 | 34,146 | 15,587 | 18,559 | 22,607 | 10,217 | 12,390 | 11,539 | 5,370 | 6,169 |
| Ryanggang Province | 65-69 | 29,442 | 12,434 | 17,008 | 19,494 | 8,193 | 11,301 | 9,948 | 4,241 | 5,707 |
| Ryanggang Province | 70-74 | 21,738 | 7,666 | 14,072 | 13,934 | 4,978 | 8,956 | 7,804 | 2,688 | 5,116 |
| Ryanggang Province | 75-79 | 11,120 | 2,708 | 8,412 | 7,034 | 1,783 | 5,251 | 4,086 | 925 | 3,161 |
| Ryanggang Province | 80+ | 6,481 | 913 | 5,568 | 4,089 | 549 | 3,540 | 2,392 | 364 | 2,028 |
| North Hamgyong Province | Total | 2,327,362 | 1,100,172 | 1,227,190 | 1,645,886 | 778,985 | 866,901 | 681,476 | 321,187 | 360,289 |
| North Hamgyong Province | 0 | 34,271 | 17,476 | 16,795 | 23,142 | 11,829 | 11,313 | 11,129 | 5,647 | 5,482 |
| North Hamgyong Province | 1-4 | 135,593 | 69,064 | 66,529 | 95,598 | 48,856 | 46,742 | 39,995 | 20,208 | 19,787 |
| North Hamgyong Province | 5-9 | 186,207 | 94,776 | 91,431 | 129,787 | 66,049 | 63,738 | 56,420 | 28,727 | 27,693 |
| North Hamgyong Province | 10-14 | 197,666 | 101,300 | 96,366 | 137,239 | 70,851 | 66,388 | 60,427 | 30,449 | 29,978 |
| North Hamgyong Province | 15-19 | 188,574 | 89,200 | 99,374 | 132,535 | 62,970 | 69,565 | 56,039 | 26,230 | 29,809 |
| North Hamgyong Province | 20-24 | 142,687 | 53,644 | 89,043 | 100,787 | 38,110 | 62,677 | 41,900 | 15,534 | 26,366 |
| North Hamgyong Province | 25-29 | 165,168 | 80,222 | 84,946 | 118,925 | 57,474 | 61,451 | 46,243 | 22,748 | 23,495 |
| North Hamgyong Province | 30-34 | 167,501 | 85,154 | 82,347 | 120,288 | 61,044 | 59,244 | 47,213 | 24,110 | 23,103 |
| North Hamgyong Province | 35-39 | 221,091 | 111,484 | 109,607 | 158,465 | 80,339 | 78,126 | 62,626 | 31,145 | 31,481 |
| North Hamgyong Province | 40-44 | 204,204 | 101,127 | 103,077 | 145,106 | 72,037 | 73,069 | 59,098 | 29,090 | 30,008 |
| North Hamgyong Province | 45-49 | 152,111 | 74,585 | 77,526 | 107,720 | 52,792 | 54,928 | 44,391 | 21,793 | 22,598 |
| North Hamgyong Province | 50-54 | 130,412 | 62,807 | 67,605 | 94,329 | 45,279 | 49,050 | 36,083 | 17,528 | 18,555 |
| North Hamgyong Province | 55-59 | 86,254 | 40,844 | 45,410 | 61,101 | 28,834 | 32,267 | 25,153 | 12,010 | 13,143 |
| North Hamgyong Province | 60-64 | 105,294 | 47,218 | 58,076 | 74,239 | 33,253 | 40,986 | 31,055 | 13,965 | 17,090 |
| North Hamgyong Province | 65-69 | 90,162 | 37,324 | 52,838 | 63,651 | 25,997 | 37,654 | 26,511 | 11,327 | 15,184 |
| North Hamgyong Province | 70-74 | 67,174 | 23,343 | 43,831 | 47,051 | 16,108 | 30,943 | 20,123 | 7,235 | 12,888 |
| North Hamgyong Province | 75-79 | 33,979 | 8,161 | 25,818 | 23,494 | 5,602 | 17,892 | 10,485 | 2,559 | 7,926 |
| North Hamgyong Province | 80+ | 19,014 | 2,443 | 16,571 | 12,429 | 1,561 | 10,868 | 6,585 | 882 | 5,703 |
| South Hamgyong Province | Total | 3,066,013 | 1,444,493 | 1,621,520 | 1,811,074 | 856,008 | 955,066 | 1,254,939 | 588,485 | 666,454 |
| South Hamgyong Province | 0 | 45,363 | 23,177 | 22,186 | 25,996 | 13,320 | 12,676 | 19,367 | 9,857 | 9,510 |
| South Hamgyong Province | 1-4 | 181,846 | 92,774 | 89,072 | 104,511 | 53,320 | 51,191 | 77,335 | 39,454 | 37,881 |
| South Hamgyong Province | 5-9 | 244,163 | 125,058 | 119,105 | 140,022 | 71,932 | 68,090 | 104,141 | 53,126 | 51,015 |
| South Hamgyong Province | 10-14 | 258,733 | 132,544 | 126,189 | 146,504 | 75,801 | 70,703 | 112,229 | 56,743 | 55,486 |
| South Hamgyong Province | 15-19 | 238,530 | 111,658 | 126,872 | 140,591 | 66,807 | 73,784 | 97,939 | 44,851 | 53,088 |
| South Hamgyong Province | 20-24 | 178,031 | 62,922 | 115,109 | 105,863 | 38,633 | 67,230 | 72,168 | 24,289 | 47,879 |
| South Hamgyong Province | 25-29 | 215,253 | 104,496 | 110,757 | 129,353 | 63,067 | 66,286 | 85,900 | 41,429 | 44,471 |
| South Hamgyong Province | 30-34 | 221,005 | 112,308 | 108,697 | 133,951 | 67,929 | 66,022 | 87,054 | 44,379 | 42,675 |
| South Hamgyong Province | 35-39 | 294,930 | 147,543 | 147,387 | 178,034 | 89,841 | 88,193 | 116,896 | 57,702 | 59,194 |
| South Hamgyong Province | 40-44 | 268,240 | 133,029 | 135,211 | 158,742 | 79,255 | 79,487 | 109,498 | 53,774 | 55,724 |
| South Hamgyong Province | 45-49 | 205,634 | 100,190 | 105,444 | 122,127 | 59,067 | 63,060 | 83,507 | 41,123 | 42,384 |
| South Hamgyong Province | 50-54 | 172,228 | 83,629 | 88,599 | 105,926 | 51,226 | 54,700 | 66,302 | 32,403 | 33,899 |
| South Hamgyong Province | 55-59 | 115,811 | 54,337 | 61,474 | 68,660 | 32,022 | 36,638 | 47,151 | 22,315 | 24,836 |
| South Hamgyong Province | 60-64 | 142,257 | 64,009 | 78,248 | 84,126 | 37,144 | 46,982 | 58,131 | 26,865 | 31,266 |
| South Hamgyong Province | 65-69 | 122,238 | 51,040 | 71,198 | 73,626 | 30,428 | 43,198 | 48,612 | 20,612 | 28,000 |
| South Hamgyong Province | 70-74 | 90,026 | 31,133 | 58,893 | 52,706 | 17,973 | 34,733 | 37,320 | 13,160 | 24,160 |
| South Hamgyong Province | 75-79 | 45,655 | 11,040 | 34,615 | 26,095 | 6,341 | 19,754 | 19,560 | 4,699 | 14,861 |
| South Hamgyong Province | 80+ | 26,070 | 3,606 | 22,464 | 14,241 | 1,902 | 12,339 | 11,829 | 1,704 | 10,125 |
| Gangwon Province | Total | 1,477,582 | 695,067 | 782,515 | 725,611 | 341,462 | 384,149 | 751,971 | 353,605 | 398,366 |
| Gangwon Province | 0 | 22,490 | 11,513 | 10,977 | 9,193 | 4,707 | 4,486 | 13,297 | 6,806 | 6,491 |
| Gangwon Province | 1-4 | 86,172 | 44,125 | 42,047 | 36,504 | 18,663 | 17,841 | 49,668 | 25,462 | 24,206 |
| Gangwon Province | 5-9 | 116,359 | 59,415 | 56,944 | 53,041 | 27,001 | 26,040 | 63,318 | 32,414 | 30,904 |
| Gangwon Province | 10-14 | 139,370 | 71,228 | 68,142 | 67,791 | 34,859 | 32,932 | 71,579 | 36,369 | 35,210 |
| Gangwon Province | 15-19 | 123,615 | 57,812 | 65,803 | 61,465 | 29,432 | 32,033 | 62,150 | 28,380 | 33,770 |
| Gangwon Province | 20-24 | 87,760 | 31,221 | 56,539 | 42,874 | 15,835 | 27,039 | 44,886 | 15,386 | 29,500 |
| Gangwon Province | 25-29 | 106,549 | 51,555 | 54,994 | 51,474 | 25,913 | 25,561 | 55,075 | 25,642 | 29,433 |
| Gangwon Province | 30-34 | 109,501 | 55,175 | 54,326 | 53,502 | 26,610 | 26,892 | 55,999 | 28,565 | 27,434 |
| Gangwon Province | 35-39 | 137,688 | 69,041 | 68,647 | 69,900 | 35,440 | 34,460 | 67,788 | 33,601 | 34,187 |
| Gangwon Province | 40-44 | 127,498 | 62,060 | 65,438 | 63,746 | 30,937 | 32,809 | 63,752 | 31,123 | 32,629 |
| Gangwon Province | 45-49 | 98,587 | 47,809 | 50,778 | 49,500 | 23,859 | 25,641 | 49,087 | 23,950 | 25,137 |
| Gangwon Province | 50-54 | 74,264 | 35,891 | 38,373 | 38,847 | 18,436 | 20,411 | 35,417 | 17,455 | 17,962 |
| Gangwon Province | 55-59 | 49,645 | 23,061 | 26,584 | 25,644 | 11,575 | 14,069 | 24,001 | 11,486 | 12,515 |
| Gangwon Province | 60-64 | 64,735 | 29,204 | 35,531 | 33,619 | 14,884 | 18,735 | 31,116 | 14,320 | 16,796 |
| Gangwon Province | 65-69 | 55,788 | 23,492 | 32,296 | 29,424 | 12,220 | 17,204 | 26,364 | 11,272 | 15,092 |
| Gangwon Province | 70-74 | 43,690 | 15,203 | 28,487 | 22,194 | 7,538 | 14,656 | 21,496 | 7,665 | 13,831 |
| Gangwon Province | 75-79 | 22,042 | 5,488 | 16,554 | 11,027 | 2,700 | 8,327 | 11,015 | 2,788 | 8,227 |
| Gangwon Province | 80+ | 11,829 | 1,774 | 10,055 | 5,866 | 853 | 5,013 | 5,963 | 921 | 5,042 |
| Jagang Province | Total | 1,299,830 | 616,828 | 683,002 | 828,253 | 392,660 | 435,593 | 471,577 | 224,168 | 247,409 |
| Jagang Province | 0 | 18,804 | 9,583 | 9,221 | 11,838 | 6,054 | 5,784 | 6,966 | 3,529 | 3,437 |
| Jagang Province | 1-4 | 77,867 | 39,771 | 38,096 | 48,536 | 24,819 | 23,717 | 29,331 | 14,952 | 14,379 |
| Jagang Province | 5-9 | 102,691 | 52,504 | 50,187 | 61,591 | 31,508 | 30,083 | 41,100 | 20,996 | 20,104 |
| Jagang Province | 10-14 | 109,360 | 56,004 | 53,356 | 64,070 | 32,912 | 31,158 | 45,290 | 23,092 | 22,198 |
| Jagang Province | 15-19 | 97,732 | 46,080 | 51,652 | 61,385 | 29,060 | 32,325 | 36,347 | 17,020 | 19,327 |
| Jagang Province | 20-24 | 79,637 | 30,124 | 49,513 | 51,464 | 19,529 | 31,935 | 28,173 | 10,595 | 17,578 |
| Jagang Province | 25-29 | 90,309 | 44,388 | 45,921 | 61,242 | 29,999 | 31,243 | 29,067 | 14,389 | 14,678 |
| Jagang Province | 30-34 | 87,909 | 44,383 | 43,526 | 58,820 | 29,603 | 29,217 | 29,089 | 14,780 | 14,309 |
| Jagang Province | 35-39 | 116,346 | 58,545 | 57,801 | 75,946 | 38,844 | 37,102 | 40,400 | 19,701 | 20,699 |
| Jagang Province | 40-44 | 112,226 | 55,765 | 56,461 | 70,494 | 35,077 | 35,417 | 41,732 | 20,688 | 21,044 |
| Jagang Province | 45-49 | 94,220 | 46,271 | 47,949 | 60,672 | 29,527 | 31,145 | 33,548 | 16,744 | 16,804 |
| Jagang Province | 50-54 | 85,675 | 41,783 | 43,892 | 56,646 | 27,265 | 29,381 | 29,029 | 14,518 | 14,511 |
| Jagang Province | 55-59 | 55,420 | 26,071 | 29,349 | 36,211 | 16,745 | 19,466 | 19,209 | 9,326 | 9,883 |
| Jagang Province | 60-64 | 59,240 | 26,768 | 32,472 | 38,961 | 17,374 | 21,587 | 20,279 | 9,394 | 10,885 |
| Jagang Province | 65-69 | 50,935 | 21,291 | 29,644 | 32,856 | 13,891 | 18,965 | 18,079 | 7,400 | 10,679 |
| Jagang Province | 70-74 | 34,371 | 12,025 | 22,346 | 21,171 | 7,269 | 13,902 | 13,200 | 4,756 | 8,444 |
| Jagang Province | 75-79 | 17,453 | 4,168 | 13,285 | 10,581 | 2,461 | 8,120 | 6,872 | 1,707 | 5,165 |
| Jagang Province | 80+ | 9,635 | 1,304 | 8,331 | 5,769 | 723 | 5,046 | 3,866 | 581 | 3,285 |
| North Pyongan Province | Total | 2,728,662 | 1,291,443 | 1,437,219 | 1,431,936 | 677,207 | 754,729 | 1,296,726 | 614,236 | 682,490 |
| North Pyongan Province | 0 | 40,336 | 20,631 | 19,705 | 20,585 | 10,513 | 10,072 | 19,751 | 10,118 | 9,633 |
| North Pyongan Province | 1-4 | 165,563 | 84,603 | 80,960 | 83,548 | 42,774 | 40,774 | 82,015 | 41,829 | 40,186 |
| North Pyongan Province | 5-9 | 213,282 | 109,010 | 104,272 | 104,453 | 53,383 | 51,070 | 108,829 | 55,627 | 53,202 |
| North Pyongan Province | 10-14 | 238,078 | 122,135 | 115,943 | 117,807 | 60,688 | 57,119 | 120,271 | 61,447 | 58,824 |
| North Pyongan Province | 15-19 | 209,862 | 98,030 | 111,832 | 109,321 | 51,363 | 57,958 | 100,541 | 46,667 | 53,874 |
| North Pyongan Province | 20-24 | 153,717 | 54,738 | 98,979 | 80,836 | 29,198 | 51,638 | 72,881 | 25,540 | 47,341 |
| North Pyongan Province | 25-29 | 189,467 | 90,906 | 98,561 | 103,590 | 49,634 | 53,956 | 85,877 | 41,272 | 44,605 |
| North Pyongan Province | 30-34 | 193,445 | 97,837 | 95,608 | 104,591 | 52,468 | 52,123 | 88,854 | 45,369 | 43,485 |
| North Pyongan Province | 35-39 | 256,858 | 128,242 | 128,616 | 140,493 | 70,654 | 69,839 | 116,365 | 57,588 | 58,777 |
| North Pyongan Province | 40-44 | 240,943 | 119,252 | 121,691 | 128,841 | 63,930 | 64,911 | 112,102 | 55,322 | 56,780 |
| North Pyongan Province | 45-49 | 188,993 | 93,105 | 95,888 | 100,957 | 49,490 | 51,467 | 88,036 | 43,615 | 44,421 |
| North Pyongan Province | 50-54 | 167,211 | 81,259 | 85,952 | 92,339 | 44,633 | 47,706 | 74,872 | 36,626 | 38,246 |
| North Pyongan Province | 55-59 | 106,513 | 50,542 | 55,971 | 56,398 | 26,256 | 30,142 | 50,115 | 24,286 | 25,829 |
| North Pyongan Province | 60-64 | 124,476 | 56,854 | 67,622 | 65,283 | 29,453 | 35,830 | 59,193 | 27,401 | 31,792 |
| North Pyongan Province | 65-69 | 107,046 | 45,150 | 61,896 | 55,939 | 23,423 | 32,516 | 51,107 | 21,727 | 29,380 |
| North Pyongan Province | 70-74 | 76,062 | 26,923 | 49,139 | 38,884 | 13,266 | 25,618 | 37,178 | 13,657 | 23,521 |
| North Pyongan Province | 75-79 | 37,507 | 9,353 | 28,154 | 18,987 | 4,722 | 14,265 | 18,520 | 4,631 | 13,889 |
| North Pyongan Province | 80+ | 19,303 | 2,873 | 16,430 | 9,084 | 1,359 | 7,725 | 10,219 | 1,514 | 8,705 |
| South Pyongan Province | Total | 4,051,696 | 1,928,935 | 2,122,761 | 2,629,943 | 1,253,805 | 1,376,138 | 1,421,753 | 675,130 | 746,623 |
| South Pyongan Province | 0 | 60,672 | 30,932 | 29,740 | 38,925 | 19,925 | 19,000 | 21,747 | 11,007 | 10,740 |
| South Pyongan Province | 1-4 | 237,083 | 120,729 | 116,354 | 149,490 | 76,034 | 73,456 | 87,593 | 44,695 | 42,898 |
| South Pyongan Province | 5-9 | 309,652 | 158,135 | 151,517 | 194,381 | 99,277 | 95,104 | 115,271 | 58,858 | 56,413 |
| South Pyongan Province | 10-14 | 335,941 | 172,295 | 163,646 | 209,100 | 107,354 | 101,746 | 126,841 | 64,941 | 61,900 |
| South Pyongan Province | 15-19 | 328,568 | 158,187 | 170,381 | 213,470 | 103,799 | 109,671 | 115,098 | 54,388 | 60,710 |
| South Pyongan Province | 20-24 | 265,628 | 110,140 | 155,488 | 173,905 | 73,000 | 100,905 | 91,723 | 37,140 | 54,583 |
| South Pyongan Province | 25-29 | 293,624 | 142,073 | 151,551 | 195,242 | 94,871 | 100,371 | 98,382 | 47,202 | 51,180 |
| South Pyongan Province | 30-34 | 290,455 | 145,175 | 145,280 | 191,200 | 95,387 | 95,813 | 99,255 | 49,788 | 49,467 |
| South Pyongan Province | 35-39 | 396,132 | 199,792 | 196,340 | 262,346 | 132,985 | 129,361 | 133,786 | 66,807 | 66,979 |
| South Pyongan Province | 40-44 | 360,348 | 180,253 | 180,095 | 235,838 | 118,166 | 117,672 | 124,510 | 62,087 | 62,423 |
| South Pyongan Province | 45-49 | 278,282 | 136,889 | 141,393 | 182,674 | 89,535 | 93,139 | 95,608 | 47,354 | 48,254 |
| South Pyongan Province | 50-54 | 224,870 | 109,437 | 115,433 | 151,722 | 73,724 | 77,998 | 73,148 | 35,713 | 37,435 |
| South Pyongan Province | 55-59 | 153,768 | 71,974 | 81,794 | 100,069 | 46,802 | 53,267 | 53,699 | 25,172 | 28,527 |
| South Pyongan Province | 60-64 | 174,370 | 78,681 | 95,689 | 112,733 | 49,925 | 62,808 | 61,637 | 28,756 | 32,881 |
| South Pyongan Province | 65-69 | 149,071 | 61,753 | 87,318 | 97,484 | 40,178 | 57,306 | 51,587 | 21,575 | 30,012 |
| South Pyongan Province | 70-74 | 107,151 | 36,255 | 70,896 | 68,551 | 22,816 | 45,735 | 38,600 | 13,439 | 25,161 |
| South Pyongan Province | 75-79 | 54,014 | 12,252 | 41,762 | 33,575 | 7,725 | 25,850 | 20,439 | 4,527 | 15,912 |
| South Pyongan Province | 80+ | 32,067 | 3,983 | 28,084 | 19,238 | 2,302 | 16,936 | 12,829 | 1,681 | 11,148 |
| North Hwanghae Province | Total | 2,113,672 | 1,003,112 | 1,110,560 | 972,632 | 461,240 | 511,392 | 1,141,040 | 541,872 | 599,168 |
| North Hwanghae Province | 0 | 30,811 | 15,722 | 15,089 | 13,240 | 6,664 | 6,576 | 17,571 | 9,058 | 8,513 |
| North Hwanghae Province | 1-4 | 122,735 | 62,568 | 60,167 | 49,543 | 25,071 | 24,472 | 73,192 | 37,497 | 35,695 |
| North Hwanghae Province | 5-9 | 168,720 | 85,938 | 82,782 | 72,020 | 36,578 | 35,442 | 96,700 | 49,360 | 47,340 |
| North Hwanghae Province | 10-14 | 191,502 | 97,870 | 93,632 | 83,302 | 43,026 | 40,276 | 108,200 | 54,844 | 53,356 |
| North Hwanghae Province | 15-19 | 173,284 | 82,761 | 90,523 | 82,082 | 39,760 | 42,322 | 91,202 | 43,001 | 48,201 |
| North Hwanghae Province | 20-24 | 135,489 | 54,744 | 80,745 | 62,568 | 25,949 | 36,619 | 72,921 | 28,795 | 44,126 |
| North Hwanghae Province | 25-29 | 151,770 | 73,676 | 78,094 | 71,256 | 34,991 | 36,265 | 80,514 | 38,685 | 41,829 |
| North Hwanghae Province | 30-34 | 151,080 | 76,828 | 74,252 | 70,209 | 35,018 | 35,191 | 80,871 | 41,810 | 39,061 |
| North Hwanghae Province | 35-39 | 198,932 | 99,792 | 99,140 | 94,935 | 47,769 | 47,166 | 103,997 | 52,023 | 51,974 |
| North Hwanghae Province | 40-44 | 179,663 | 89,154 | 90,509 | 84,748 | 42,008 | 42,740 | 94,915 | 47,146 | 47,769 |
| North Hwanghae Province | 45-49 | 138,508 | 67,931 | 70,577 | 66,259 | 32,621 | 33,638 | 72,249 | 35,310 | 36,939 |
| North Hwanghae Province | 50-54 | 116,312 | 56,370 | 59,942 | 56,577 | 27,187 | 29,390 | 59,735 | 29,183 | 30,552 |
| North Hwanghae Province | 55-59 | 78,565 | 36,578 | 41,987 | 36,480 | 16,565 | 19,915 | 42,085 | 20,013 | 22,072 |
| North Hwanghae Province | 60-64 | 91,104 | 40,835 | 50,269 | 42,569 | 18,654 | 23,915 | 48,535 | 22,181 | 26,354 |
| North Hwanghae Province | 65-69 | 78,168 | 32,381 | 45,787 | 37,322 | 15,370 | 21,952 | 40,846 | 17,011 | 23,835 |
| North Hwanghae Province | 70-74 | 59,990 | 20,554 | 39,436 | 27,955 | 9,526 | 18,429 | 32,035 | 11,028 | 21,007 |
| North Hwanghae Province | 75-79 | 30,459 | 7,159 | 23,300 | 14,196 | 3,477 | 10,719 | 16,263 | 3,682 | 12,581 |
| North Hwanghae Province | 80+ | 16,580 | 2,251 | 14,329 | 7,371 | 1,006 | 6,365 | 9,209 | 1,245 | 7,964 |
| South Hwanghae Province | Total | 2,310,485 | 1,090,956 | 1,219,529 | 821,954 | 388,804 | 433,150 | 1,488,531 | 702,152 | 786,379 |
| South Hwanghae Province | 0 | 32,140 | 16,406 | 15,734 | 10,654 | 5,387 | 5,267 | 21,486 | 11,019 | 10,467 |
| South Hwanghae Province | 1-4 | 133,621 | 68,325 | 65,296 | 42,508 | 21,803 | 20,705 | 91,113 | 46,522 | 44,591 |
| South Hwanghae Province | 5-9 | 192,275 | 98,418 | 93,857 | 64,405 | 33,061 | 31,344 | 127,870 | 65,357 | 62,513 |
| South Hwanghae Province | 10-14 | 222,104 | 113,881 | 108,223 | 75,809 | 39,312 | 36,497 | 146,295 | 74,569 | 71,726 |
| South Hwanghae Province | 15-19 | 187,769 | 88,275 | 99,494 | 70,841 | 34,311 | 36,530 | 116,928 | 53,964 | 62,964 |
| South Hwanghae Province | 20-24 | 135,817 | 49,348 | 86,469 | 48,707 | 18,265 | 30,442 | 87,110 | 31,083 | 56,027 |
| South Hwanghae Province | 25-29 | 151,467 | 72,980 | 78,487 | 55,584 | 26,959 | 28,625 | 95,883 | 46,021 | 49,862 |
| South Hwanghae Province | 30-34 | 156,173 | 79,188 | 76,985 | 54,417 | 27,247 | 27,170 | 101,756 | 51,941 | 49,815 |
| South Hwanghae Province | 35-39 | 205,090 | 103,002 | 102,088 | 74,418 | 37,370 | 37,048 | 130,672 | 65,632 | 65,040 |
| South Hwanghae Province | 40-44 | 184,420 | 91,623 | 92,797 | 67,420 | 33,496 | 33,924 | 117,000 | 58,127 | 58,873 |
| South Hwanghae Province | 45-49 | 140,462 | 68,762 | 71,700 | 52,959 | 25,880 | 27,079 | 87,503 | 42,882 | 44,621 |
| South Hwanghae Province | 50-54 | 137,571 | 66,856 | 70,715 | 54,544 | 26,980 | 27,564 | 83,027 | 39,876 | 43,151 |
| South Hwanghae Province | 55-59 | 94,318 | 44,265 | 50,053 | 32,555 | 14,967 | 17,588 | 61,763 | 29,298 | 32,465 |
| South Hwanghae Province | 60-64 | 115,207 | 52,060 | 63,147 | 38,791 | 16,906 | 21,885 | 76,416 | 35,154 | 41,262 |
| South Hwanghae Province | 65-69 | 98,178 | 41,154 | 57,024 | 34,596 | 14,076 | 20,520 | 63,582 | 27,078 | 36,504 |
| South Hwanghae Province | 70-74 | 73,242 | 25,394 | 47,848 | 25,868 | 8,694 | 17,174 | 47,374 | 16,700 | 30,674 |
| South Hwanghae Province | 75-79 | 36,430 | 8,867 | 27,563 | 13,273 | 3,342 | 9,931 | 23,157 | 5,525 | 17,632 |
| South Hwanghae Province | 80+ | 14,201 | 2,152 | 12,049 | 4,605 | 748 | 3,857 | 9,596 | 1,404 | 8,192 |
| Pyongyang city | Total | 3,255,288 | 1,549,778 | 1,705,510 | 2,823,414 | 1,347,210 | 1,476,204 | 431,874 | 202,568 | 229,306 |
| Pyongyang city | 0 | 46,242 | 23,550 | 22,692 | 39,023 | 19,906 | 19,117 | 7,219 | 3,644 | 3,575 |
| Pyongyang city | 1-4 | 186,485 | 94,756 | 91,729 | 158,653 | 81,027 | 77,626 | 27,832 | 13,729 | 14,103 |
| Pyongyang city | 5-9 | 253,474 | 129,213 | 124,261 | 218,223 | 111,782 | 106,441 | 35,251 | 17,431 | 17,820 |
| Pyongyang city | 10-14 | 262,662 | 134,234 | 128,428 | 225,178 | 115,498 | 109,680 | 37,484 | 18,736 | 18,748 |
| Pyongyang city | 15-19 | 255,445 | 123,952 | 131,493 | 221,286 | 107,812 | 113,474 | 34,159 | 16,140 | 18,019 |
| Pyongyang city | 20-24 | 220,815 | 94,226 | 126,589 | 190,145 | 82,093 | 108,052 | 30,670 | 12,133 | 18,537 |
| Pyongyang city | 25-29 | 236,646 | 117,069 | 119,577 | 205,305 | 101,398 | 103,907 | 31,341 | 15,671 | 15,670 |
| Pyongyang city | 30-34 | 244,917 | 124,600 | 120,317 | 214,349 | 108,525 | 105,824 | 30,568 | 16,075 | 14,493 |
| Pyongyang city | 35-39 | 314,964 | 160,718 | 154,246 | 275,998 | 141,007 | 134,991 | 38,966 | 19,711 | 19,255 |
| Pyongyang city | 40-44 | 273,761 | 138,394 | 135,367 | 239,730 | 121,010 | 118,720 | 34,031 | 17,384 | 16,647 |
| Pyongyang city | 45-49 | 213,298 | 104,831 | 108,467 | 186,635 | 92,051 | 94,584 | 26,663 | 12,780 | 13,883 |
| Pyongyang city | 50-54 | 165,813 | 79,487 | 86,326 | 145,118 | 69,382 | 75,736 | 20,695 | 10,105 | 10,590 |
| Pyongyang city | 55-59 | 135,163 | 62,733 | 72,430 | 118,061 | 54,575 | 63,486 | 17,102 | 8,158 | 8,944 |
| Pyongyang city | 60-64 | 147,312 | 65,389 | 81,923 | 127,402 | 56,970 | 70,432 | 19,910 | 8,419 | 11,491 |
| Pyongyang city | 65-69 | 132,246 | 53,407 | 78,839 | 114,722 | 46,389 | 68,333 | 17,524 | 7,018 | 10,506 |
| Pyongyang city | 70-74 | 89,173 | 29,780 | 59,393 | 77,546 | 26,036 | 51,510 | 11,627 | 3,744 | 7,883 |
| Pyongyang city | 75-79 | 46,803 | 10,030 | 36,773 | 40,312 | 8,806 | 31,506 | 6,491 | 1,224 | 5,267 |
| Pyongyang city | 80+ | 30,069 | 3,409 | 26,660 | 25,728 | 2,943 | 22,785 | 4,341 | 466 | 3,875 |

=== Population by age, by gender, by proportion of men and women, by sex ratio ===
Source: DPRKorea 2008 Population Census National Report

| By age | 2008 | | | | | | |
| By age | Population (number of people) | | | Percentage by gender (%) | | | Gender ratio (male/female) |
| By age | Total | Man | Woman | Total | Man | Woman | Total |
|---|---|---|---|---|---|---|---|
| Total | 24,052,231 | 11,721,838 | 12,330,393 | 100.0 | 100.0 | 100.0 | 95.1 |
| 0-4 | 1,710,039 | 872,173 | 837,866 | 7.1 | 7.4 | 6.8 | 104.1 |
| 0 | 341,461 | 174,268 | 167,193 | 1.4 | 1.5 | 1.4 | 104.2 |
| 1 | 343,636 | 175,080 | 168,556 | 1.4 | 1.5 | 1.4 | 103.9 |
| 2 | 340,756 | 173,820 | 166,936 | 1.4 | 1.5 | 1.4 | 104.1 |
| 3 | 340,640 | 173,877 | 166,763 | 1.4 | 1.5 | 1.4 | 104.3 |
| 4 | 343,546 | 175,128 | 168,418 | 1.4 | 1.5 | 1.4 | 104.0 |
| 5-9 | 1,846,785 | 943,048 | 903,737 | 7.7 | 8.0 | 7.3 | 104.4 |
| 5 | 348,244 | 177,519 | 170,725 | 1.4 | 1.5 | 1.4 | 104.0 |
| 6 | 358,630 | 182,851 | 175,779 | 1.5 | 1.6 | 1.4 | 104.0 |
| 7 | 373,460 | 190,386 | 183,074 | 1.6 | 1.6 | 1.5 | 104.0 |
| 8 | 378,734 | 193,763 | 184,971 | 1.6 | 1.7 | 1.5 | 104.8 |
| 9 | 387,717 | 198,529 | 189,188 | 1.6 | 1.7 | 1.5 | 104.9 |
| 10-14 | 2,021,350 | 1,035,282 | 986,068 | 8.4 | 8.8 | 8.0 | 105.0 |
| 10 | 381,532 | 196,080 | 185,452 | 1.6 | 1.7 | 1.5 | 105.7 |
| 11 | 392,860 | 201,339 | 191,521 | 1.6 | 1.7 | 1.6 | 105.1 |
| 12 | 419,070 | 214,367 | 204,703 | 1.7 | 1.8 | 1.7 | 104.7 |
| 13 | 417,757 | 213,729 | 204,028 | 1.7 | 1.8 | 1.7 | 104.8 |
| 14 | 410,131 | 209,767 | 200,364 | 1.7 | 1.8 | 1.6 | 104.7 |
| 15-19 | 2,052,342 | 1,050,113 | 1,002,229 | 8.5 | 9.0 | 8.1 | 104.8 |
| 15 | 404,916 | 207,200 | 197,716 | 1.7 | 1.8 | 1.6 | 104.8 |
| 16 | 423,303 | 216,855 | 206,448 | 1.8 | 1.9 | 1.7 | 105.0 |
| 17 | 411,178 | 210,240 | 200,938 | 1.7 | 1.8 | 1.6 | 104.6 |
| 18 | 406,934 | 208,055 | 198,879 | 1.7 | 1.8 | 1.6 | 104.6 |
| 19 | 406,011 | 207,763 | 198,248 | 1.7 | 1.8 | 1.6 | 104.8 |
| 20-24 | 1,841,400 | 941,017 | 900,383 | 7.7 | 8.0 | 7.3 | 104.5 |
| 20 | 369,876 | 188,586 | 181,290 | 1.5 | 1.6 | 1.5 | 104.0 |
| 21 | 369,111 | 188,143 | 180,968 | 1.5 | 1.6 | 1.5 | 104.0 |
| 22 | 371,307 | 190,180 | 181,127 | 1.5 | 1.6 | 1.5 | 105.0 |
| 23 | 361,335 | 184,724 | 176,611 | 1.5 | 1.6 | 1.4 | 104.6 |
| 24 | 369,771 | 189,384 | 180,387 | 1.5 | 1.6 | 1.5 | 105.0 |
| 25-29 | 1,737,185 | 887,573 | 849,612 | 7.2 | 7.6 | 6.9 | 104.5 |
| 25 | 347,425 | 177,093 | 170,332 | 1.4 | 1.5 | 1.4 | 104.0 |
| 26 | 357,745 | 182,790 | 174,955 | 1.5 | 1.6 | 1.4 | 104.5 |
| 27 | 345,247 | 176,710 | 168,537 | 1.4 | 1.5 | 1.4 | 104.9 |
| 28 | 347,297 | 177,399 | 169,898 | 1.4 | 1.5 | 1.4 | 104.4 |
| 29 | 339,471 | 173,581 | 165,890 | 1.4 | 1.5 | 1.3 | 104.6 |
| 30-34 | 1,680,272 | 853,276 | 826,996 | 7.0 | 7.3 | 6.7 | 103.2 |
| 30 | 318,969 | 162,178 | 156,791 | 1.3 | 1.4 | 1.3 | 103.4 |
| 31 | 293,116 | 148,217 | 144,899 | 1.2 | 1.3 | 1.2 | 102.3 |
| 32 | 316,341 | 161,344 | 154,997 | 1.3 | 1.4 | 1.3 | 104.1 |
| 33 | 372,776 | 190,086 | 182,690 | 1.5 | 1.6 | 1.5 | 104.1 |
| 34 | 379,070 | 191,451 | 187,619 | 1.6 | 1.6 | 1.5 | 102.0 |
| 35-39 | 2,214,929 | 1,118,391 | 1,096,538 | 9.2 | 9.5 | 8.9 | 102.0 |
| 35 | 393,037 | 198,026 | 195,011 | 1.6 | 1.7 | 1.6 | 101.5 |
| 36 | 476,923 | 240,313 | 236,610 | 2.0 | 2.1 | 1.9 | 101.6 |
| 37 | 443,996 | 225,162 | 218,834 | 1.8 | 1.9 | 1.8 | 102.9 |
| 38 | 450,686 | 227,454 | 223,232 | 1.9 | 1.9 | 1.8 | 101.9 |
| 39 | 450,287 | 227,436 | 222,851 | 1.9 | 1.9 | 1.8 | 102.1 |
| 40-44 | 2,015,514 | 1,005,140 | 1,010,374 | 8.4 | 8.6 | 8.2 | 99.5 |
| 40 | 438,137 | 217,401 | 220,736 | 1.8 | 1.9 | 1.8 | 98.5 |
| 41 | 469,165 | 234,740 | 234,425 | 2.0 | 2.0 | 1.9 | 100.1 |
| 42 | 386,019 | 192,728 | 193,291 | 1.6 | 1.6 | 1.6 | 99.7 |
| 43 | 368,040 | 183,454 | 184,586 | 1.5 | 1.6 | 1.5 | 99.4 |
| 44 | 354,153 | 176,817 | 177,336 | 1.5 | 1.5 | 1.4 | 99.7 |
| 45-49 | 1,559,527 | 766,054 | 793,473 | 6.5 | 6.5 | 6.4 | 96.5 |
| 45 | 358,695 | 177,834 | 180,861 | 1.5 | 1.5 | 1.5 | 98.3 |
| 46 | 326,750 | 162,842 | 163,908 | 1.4 | 1.4 | 1.3 | 99.4 |
| 47 | 286,098 | 140,111 | 145,987 | 1.2 | 1.2 | 1.2 | 96.0 |
| 48 | 302,970 | 147,830 | 155,140 | 1.3 | 1.3 | 1.3 | 95.3 |
| 49 | 285,014 | 137,437 | 147,577 | 1.2 | 1.2 | 1.2 | 93.1 |
| 50-54 | 1,315,101 | 637,737 | 677,364 | 5.5 | 5.4 | 5.5 | 94.2 |
| 50 | 336,530 | 164,338 | 172,192 | 1.4 | 1.4 | 1.4 | 95.4 |
| 51 | 335,555 | 163,137 | 172,418 | 1.4 | 1.4 | 1.4 | 94.6 |
| 52 | 210,429 | 102,347 | 108,082 | 0.9 | 0.9 | 0.9 | 94.7 |
| 53 | 232,565 | 111,910 | 120,655 | 1.0 | 1.0 | 1.0 | 92.8 |
| 54 | 200,022 | 96,005 | 104,017 | 0.8 | 0.8 | 0.8 | 92.3 |
| 55-59 | 902,876 | 423,625 | 479,251 | 3.8 | 3.6 | 3.9 | 88.4 |
| 55 | 168,575 | 80,264 | 88,311 | 0.7 | 0.7 | 0.7 | 90.9 |
| 56 | 133,907 | 63,381 | 70,526 | 0.6 | 0.5 | 0.6 | 89.9 |
| 57 | 136,527 | 63,610 | 72,917 | 0.6 | 0.5 | 0.6 | 87.2 |
| 58 | 233,448 | 109,362 | 124,086 | 1.0 | 0.9 | 1.0 | 88.1 |
| 59 | 230,419 | 107,008 | 123,411 | 1.0 | 0.9 | 1.0 | 86.7 |
| 60-64 | 1,058,263 | 476,727 | 581,536 | 4.4 | 4.1 | 4.7 | 82.0 |
| 60 | 227,500 | 104,566 | 122,934 | 0.9 | 0.9 | 1.0 | 85.1 |
| 61 | 220,311 | 100,276 | 120,035 | 0.9 | 0.9 | 1.0 | 83.5 |
| 62 | 217,186 | 98,159 | 119,027 | 0.9 | 0.8 | 1.0 | 82.5 |
| 63 | 201,459 | 89,364 | 112,095 | 0.8 | 0.8 | 0.9 | 79.7 |
| 64 | 191,807 | 84,362 | 107,445 | 0.8 | 0.7 | 0.9 | 78.5 |
| 65-69 | 913,304 | 379,456 | 533,848 | 3.8 | 3.2 | 4.3 | 71.1 |
| 65 | 185,316 | 79,746 | 105,570 | 0.8 | 0.7 | 0.9 | 75.5 |
| 66 | 212,636 | 89,961 | 122,675 | 0.9 | 0.8 | 1.0 | 73.3 |
| 67 | 184,115 | 76,550 | 107,565 | 0.8 | 0.7 | 0.9 | 71.2 |
| 68 | 171,146 | 69,958 | 101,188 | 0.7 | 0.6 | 0.8 | 69.1 |
| 69 | 160,091 | 63,241 | 96,850 | 0.7 | 0.5 | 0.8 | 65.3 |
| 70-74 | 662,627 | 228,286 | 434,341 | 2.8 | 1.9 | 3.5 | 52.6 |
| 70 | 177,206 | 65,313 | 111,893 | 0.7 | 0.6 | 0.9 | 58.4 |
| 71 | 145,067 | 53,172 | 91,895 | 0.6 | 0.5 | 0.7 | 57.9 |
| 72 | 129,272 | 45,243 | 84,029 | 0.5 | 0.4 | 0.7 | 53.8 |
| 73 | 114,955 | 37,087 | 77,868 | 0.5 | 0.3 | 0.6 | 47.6 |
| 74 | 96,127 | 27,471 | 68,656 | 0.4 | 0.2 | 0.6 | 40.0 |
| 75-79 | 335,467 | 79,231 | 256,236 | 1.4 | 0.7 | 2.1 | 30.9 |
| 75 | 97,434 | 26,213 | 71,221 | 0.4 | 0.2 | 0.6 | 36.8 |
| 76 | 78,097 | 19,329 | 58,768 | 0.3 | 0.2 | 0.5 | 32.9 |
| 77 | 59,180 | 14,056 | 45,124 | 0.2 | 0.1 | 0.4 | 31.2 |
| 78 | 57,060 | 11,685 | 45,375 | 0.2 | 0.1 | 0.4 | 25.8 |
| 79 | 43,696 | 7,948 | 35,748 | 0.2 | 0.1 | 0.3 | 22.2 |
| 80-84 | 132,149 | 18,884 | 113,265 | 0.5 | 0.2 | 0.9 | 16.7 |
| 80 | 38,489 | 6,139 | 32,350 | 0.2 | 0.1 | 0.3 | 19.0 |
| 81 | 29,563 | 4,457 | 25,106 | 0.1 | 0.0 | 0.2 | 17.8 |
| 82 | 25,652 | 3,547 | 22,105 | 0.1 | 0.0 | 0.2 | 16.1 |
| 83 | 21,636 | 2,757 | 18,879 | 0.1 | 0.0 | 0.2 | 14.6 |
| 84 | 16,809 | 1,984 | 14,825 | 0.1 | 0.0 | 0.1 | 13.4 |
| 85-89 | 42,760 | 4,930 | 37,830 | 0.2 | 0.0 | 0.3 | 13.0 |
| 85 | 12,748 | 1,397 | 11,351 | 0.1 | 0.0 | 0.1 | 12.3 |
| 86 | 11,389 | 1,239 | 10,150 | 0.0 | 0.0 | 0.1 | 12.2 |
| 87 | 9,009 | 1,063 | 7,946 | 0.0 | 0.0 | 0.1 | 13.4 |
| 88 | 5,859 | 783 | 5,076 | 0.0 | 0.0 | 0.0 | 15.4 |
| 89 | 3,755 | 448 | 3,307 | 0.0 | 0.0 | 0.0 | 13.6 |
| 90-94 | 8,634 | 809 | 7,825 | 0.0 | 0.0 | 0.1 | 10.3 |
| 90 | 2,972 | 355 | 2,617 | 0.0 | 0.0 | 0.0 | 13.6 |
| 91 | 2,669 | 271 | 2,398 | 0.0 | 0.0 | 0.0 | 11.3 |
| 92 | 1,305 | 80 | 1,225 | 0.0 | 0.0 | 0.0 | 6.5 |
| 93 | 956 | 50 | 906 | 0.0 | 0.0 | 0.0 | 5.5 |
| 94 | 732 | 53 | 679 | 0.0 | 0.0 | 0.0 | 7.8 |
| 95-99 | 1,643 | 86 | 1,557 | 0.0 | 0.0 | 0.0 | 5.5 |
| 95 | 516 | 27 | 489 | 0.0 | 0.0 | 0.0 | 5.5 |
| 96 | 482 | 20 | 462 | 0.0 | 0.0 | 0.0 | 4.3 |
| 97 | 300 | 27 | 273 | 0.0 | 0.0 | 0.0 | 9.9 |
| 98 | 186 | 9 | 177 | 0.0 | 0.0 | 0.0 | 5.1 |
| 99 | 159 | 3 | 156 | 0.0 | 0.0 | 0.0 | 1.9 |
| 100-104 | 54 | 0 | 54 | 0.0 | 0.0 | 0.0 | 0.0 |
| 100 | 40 | 0 | 40 | 0.0 | 0.0 | 0.0 | 0.0 |
| 101 | 3 | 0 | 3 | 0.0 | 0.0 | 0.0 | 0.0 |
| 102 | 4 | 0 | 4 | 0.0 | 0.0 | 0.0 | 0.0 |
| 103 | 4 | 0 | 4 | 0.0 | 0.0 | 0.0 | 0.0 |
| 104 | 3 | 0 | 3 | 0.0 | 0.0 | 0.0 | 0.0 |
| 105-109 | 8 | - | 8 | 0.0 | - | 0.0 | 0.0 |
| 105 | 1 | 0 | 1 | 0.0 | 0.0 | 0.0 | 0.0 |
| 106 | 2 | 0 | 2 | 0.0 | 0.0 | 0.0 | 0.0 |
| 107 | 2 | 0 | 2 | 0.0 | 0.0 | 0.0 | 0.0 |
| 108 | 1 | 0 | 1 | 0.0 | 0.0 | 0.0 | 0.0 |
| 109 | 2 | 0 | 2 | 0.0 | 0.0 | 0.0 | 0.0 |
| 110+ | 2 | 0 | 2 | 0.0 | 0.0 | 0.0 | 0.0 |

== Population by Sex and by Urban-Rural, by City/District/County and Province ==
Source: DPRKorea 2008 Population Census National Report

| Province and City/District/County | 2008 | | | | | | | | |
| Province and City/District/County | All Areas | | | Urban | | | Rural | | |
| Province and City/District/County | Both Sexes | Male | Female | Both Sexes | Male | Female | Both Sexes | Male | Female |
|---|---|---|---|---|---|---|---|---|---|
| DPR Korea (전국) | 23,349,859 | 11,059,489 | 12,290,370 | 14,155,393 | 6,716,215 | 7,439,178 | 9,194,466 | 4,343,274 | 4,851,192 |
| Ryanggang (량강도) | 719,269 | 338,705 | 380,564 | 464,690 | 218,834 | 245,856 | 254,579 | 119,871 | 134,708 |
| Hyesan City (혜산시) | 192,680 | 91,420 | 101,260 | 174,015 | 82,604 | 91,411 | 18,665 | 8,816 | 9,849 |
| Samsu (삼수군) | 40,311 | 18,925 | 21,386 | 15,577 | 7,309 | 8,268 | 24,734 | 11,616 | 13,118 |
| Kim Jong Suk (김정숙군) | 42,618 | 20,020 | 22,598 | 19,840 | 9,256 | 10,584 | 22,778 | 10,764 | 12,014 |
| Kim Hyong Jik (김형직군) | 57,729 | 27,336 | 30,393 | 41,610 | 19,618 | 21,992 | 16,119 | 7,718 | 8,401 |
| Kim Hyong Gwon (김형권군) | 37,528 | 17,484 | 20,044 | 12,635 | 5,924 | 6,711 | 24,893 | 11,560 | 13,333 |
| Pochon (보천군) | 37,225 | 17,712 | 19,513 | 17,077 | 8,166 | 8,911 | 20,148 | 9,546 | 10,602 |
| Samjiyon (삼지연군) | 31,471 | 14,738 | 16,733 | 25,558 | 11,942 | 13,616 | 5,913 | 2,796 | 3,117 |
| Taehongdan (대흥단군) | 35,596 | 16,702 | 18,894 | 9,407 | 4,348 | 5,059 | 26,189 | 12,354 | 13,835 |
| Unhung (운흥군) | 61,705 | 28,946 | 32,759 | 44,713 | 20,921 | 23,792 | 16,992 | 8,025 | 8,967 |
| Paekam (백암군) | 67,683 | 31,677 | 36,006 | 46,256 | 21,626 | 24,630 | 21,427 | 10,051 | 11,376 |
| Kabsan (갑산군) | 70,611 | 32,980 | 37,631 | 36,404 | 16,989 | 19,415 | 34,207 | 15,991 | 18,216 |
| Phungso (풍서군) | 44,112 | 20,765 | 23,347 | 21,598 | 10,131 | 11,467 | 22,514 | 10,634 | 11,880 |
| North Hamgyong (함경북도) | 2,327,362 | 1,100,172 | 1,227,190 | 1,645,886 | 778,985 | 866,901 | 681,476 | 321,187 | 360,289 |
| Rason City (라선시) | 196,954 | 92,963 | 103,991 | 158,337 | 74,777 | 83,560 | 38,617 | 18,186 | 20,431 |
| Kim Chaek City (김책시) | 207,299 | 97,604 | 109,695 | 155,284 | 73,133 | 82,151 | 52,015 | 24,471 | 27,544 |
| Hoeryong City (회경시) | 153,532 | 72,332 | 81,200 | 92,494 | 43,364 | 49,130 | 61,038 | 28,968 | 32,070 |
| Sinam Dist. (Note: Part of Chongjin city) (신암구역) | 64,924 | 30,616 | 34,308 | 64,924 | 30,616 | 34,308 | - | - | - |
| Chongam Dist. (청암구역) | 136,659 | 64,533 | 72,126 | 114,910 | 54,234 | 60,676 | 21,749 | 10,299 | 11,450 |
| Phohang Dist. (포항구역) | 104,007 | 49,727 | 54,280 | 104,007 | 49,727 | 54,280 | - | - | - |
| Sunam Dist. (수남구역) | 82,765 | 38,752 | 44,013 | 82,765 | 38,752 | 44,013 | - | - | - |
| Songphyong Dist. (송평구역) | 146,973 | 70,030 | 76,943 | 125,174 | 59,713 | 65,461 | 21,799 | 10,317 | 11,482 |
| Ranam Dist. (라남구역) | 112,343 | 54,444 | 57,899 | 107,799 | 52,263 | 55,536 | 4,544 | 2,181 | 2,363 |
| Puyun Dist. (부윤구역) | 20,258 | 9,797 | 10,461 | 15,313 | 7,436 | 7,877 | 4,945 | 2,361 | 2,584 |
| Kilju (길주군) | 139,932 | 65,308 | 74,624 | 74,154 | 34,639 | 39,515 | 65,778 | 30,669 | 35,109 |
| Hwadae (화대군) | 67,677 | 31,657 | 36,020 | 15,095 | 7,073 | 8,022 | 52,582 | 24,584 | 27,998 |
| Myongchon (명천군) | 65,797 | 30,440 | 35,357 | 33,439 | 15,424 | 18,015 | 32,358 | 15,016 | 17,342 |
| Myonggan (명간군) | 99,557 | 46,730 | 52,827 | 49,968 | 23,550 | 26,418 | 49,589 | 23,180 | 26,409 |
| Orang (어랑군) | 87,757 | 41,572 | 46,185 | 35,202 | 16,673 | 18,529 | 52,555 | 24,899 | 27,656 |
| Kyongsong (경성군) | 105,909 | 49,736 | 56,173 | 70,533 | 32,975 | 37,558 | 35,376 | 16,761 | 18,615 |
| Yonsa (연사군) | 37,876 | 17,948 | 19,928 | 18,332 | 8,631 | 9,701 | 19,544 | 9,317 | 10,227 |
| Musan (무산군) | 123,721 | 59,354 | 64,367 | 84,547 | 40,670 | 43,877 | 39,174 | 18,684 | 20,490 |
| Puryong (부령군) | 48,958 | 23,241 | 25,717 | 38,118 | 18,086 | 20,032 | 10,840 | 5,155 | 5,685 |
| Onsong (온성군) | 127,893 | 60,905 | 66,988 | 91,868 | 43,752 | 48,116 | 36,025 | 17,153 | 18,872 |
| Kyongwon (경원군) | 107,327 | 50,433 | 56,894 | 47,070 | 22,082 | 24,988 | 60,257 | 28,351 | 31,906 |
| Kyonghung (경흥군) | 89,244 | 42,050 | 47,194 | 66,553 | 31,415 | 35,138 | 22,691 | 10,635 | 12,056 |
| South Hamgyong (함경남도) | 3,066,013 | 1,444,493 | 1,621,520 | 1,811,074 | 856,008 | 955,066 | 1,254,939 | 588,485 | 666,454 |
| Sinpho City (신포시) | 152,759 | 73,454 | 79,305 | 130,951 | 63,207 | 67,744 | 21,808 | 10,247 | 11,561 |
| Tanchon City (단천시) | 345,875 | 162,491 | 183,384 | 240,873 | 113,221 | 127,652 | 105,002 | 49,270 | 55,732 |
| Songchongang Dist. (Note: Part of Hamhung city) (성천강구역) | 127,102 | 60,023 | 67,079 | 127,102 | 60,023 | 67,079 | - | - | - |
| Tonghungsan Dist. (동흥산구역) | 120,559 | 58,212 | 62,347 | 112,584 | 54,486 | 58,098 | 7,975 | 3,726 | 4,249 |
| Hoesang Dist. (회상구역) | 156,608 | 73,754 | 82,854 | 120,648 | 56,847 | 63,801 | 35,960 | 16,907 | 19,053 |
| Sapho Dist. (사포구역) | 115,317 | 55,336 | 59,981 | 115,317 | 55,336 | 59,981 | - | - | - |
| Hungdok Dist. (흥덕구역) | 68,093 | 32,072 | 36,021 | 64,933 | 30,616 | 34,317 | 3,160 | 1,456 | 1,704 |
| Haean Dist. (해안구역) | 80,878 | 38,205 | 42,673 | 73,614 | 34,750 | 38,864 | 7,264 | 3,455 | 3,809 |
| Hungnam (흥남구역) | 99,994 | 47,220 | 52,774 | 89,412 | 42,109 | 47,303 | 10,582 | 5,111 | 5,471 |
| Hamju (함주군) | 133,896 | 62,656 | 71,240 | 31,136 | 14,592 | 16,544 | 102,760 | 48,064 | 54,696 |
| Yonggwang (영광군) | 103,532 | 48,471 | 55,061 | 27,075 | 12,632 | 14,443 | 76,457 | 35,839 | 40,618 |
| Sinhung (신흥군) | 104,002 | 49,194 | 54,808 | 50,071 | 23,611 | 26,460 | 53,931 | 25,583 | 28,348 |
| Pujon (부전군) | 48,351 | 22,709 | 25,642 | 27,440 | 12,804 | 14,636 | 20,911 | 9,905 | 11,006 |
| Jangjin (장진군) | 64,681 | 30,521 | 34,160 | 30,729 | 14,480 | 16,249 | 33,952 | 16,041 | 17,911 |
| Jongphyong (정평군) | 179,114 | 84,130 | 94,984 | 53,159 | 25,092 | 28,067 | 125,955 | 59,038 | 66,917 |
| Kumya (금야군) | 211,140 | 98,759 | 112,381 | 73,094 | 34,091 | 39,003 | 138,046 | 64,668 | 73,378 |
| Yodok (요덕군) | 40,839 | 19,148 | 21,691 | 12,301 | 5,823 | 6,478 | 28,538 | 13,325 | 15,213 |
| Kowon (고원군) | 94,963 | 44,531 | 50,432 | 43,916 | 20,701 | 23,215 | 51,047 | 23,830 | 27,217 |
| Rakwon (락원군) | 60,700 | 28,518 | 32,182 | 22,740 | 10,731 | 12,009 | 37,960 | 17,787 | 20,173 |
| Hongwon (홍원군) | 142,910 | 67,216 | 75,694 | 71,763 | 33,849 | 37,914 | 71,147 | 33,367 | 37,780 |
| Pukchong (북청군) | 161,886 | 75,487 | 86,399 | 60,803 | 28,466 | 32,337 | 101,083 | 47,021 | 54,062 |
| Toksong (덕성군) | 97,617 | 45,935 | 51,682 | 27,889 | 13,159 | 14,730 | 69,728 | 32,776 | 36,952 |
| Riwon (리원군) | 117,320 | 55,141 | 62,179 | 57,036 | 26,848 | 30,188 | 60,284 | 28,293 | 31,991 |
| Hochon (허천군) | 104,731 | 49,299 | 55,432 | 68,313 | 32,034 | 36,279 | 36,418 | 17,265 | 19,153 |
| Sudong (수동구) | 95,716 | 44,662 | 51,054 | 64,859 | 30,287 | 34,572 | 30,857 | 14,375 | 16,482 |
| Kumho (금호지구) | 37,430 | 17,349 | 20,081 | 13,316 | 6,213 | 7,103 | 24,114 | 11,136 | 12,978 |
| Kangwon (강원도) | 1,477,582 | 695,067 | 782,515 | 725,611 | 341,462 | 384,149 | 751,971 | 353,605 | 398,366 |
| Wonsan City (원산시) | 363,127 | 172,014 | 191,113 | 328,467 | 155,903 | 172,564 | 34,660 | 16,111 | 18,549 |
| Munchon City (문천시) | 122,934 | 57,071 | 65,863 | 92,525 | 42,915 | 49,610 | 30,409 | 14,156 | 16,253 |
| Anbyon (안변군) | 93,960 | 43,663 | 50,297 | 27,030 | 12,633 | 14,397 | 66,930 | 31,030 | 35,900 |
| Kosan (고산군) | 103,579 | 48,481 | 55,098 | 31,672 | 14,948 | 16,724 | 71,907 | 33,533 | 38,374 |
| Thongchon (통천군) | 89,357 | 41,681 | 47,676 | 25,863 | 12,014 | 13,849 | 63,494 | 29,667 | 33,827 |
| Kosong (고성군) | 61,277 | 28,939 | 32,338 | 20,330 | 9,497 | 10,833 | 40,947 | 19,442 | 21,505 |
| Kumgang (금강군) | 54,211 | 25,678 | 28,533 | 12,176 | 5,678 | 6,498 | 42,035 | 20,000 | 22,035 |
| Changdo (창도군) | 51,319 | 24,268 | 27,051 | 11,380 | 5,321 | 6,059 | 39,939 | 18,947 | 20,992 |
| Kimhwa (김화군) | 56,541 | 26,710 | 29,831 | 18,525 | 8,715 | 9,810 | 38,016 | 17,995 | 20,021 |
| Hoeyang (회양군) | 42,485 | 20,014 | 22,471 | 11,674 | 5,485 | 6,189 | 30,811 | 14,529 | 16,282 |
| Sepho (세포군) | 61,113 | 28,697 | 32,416 | 15,949 | 7,465 | 8,484 | 45,164 | 21,232 | 23,932 |
| Phyonggang (평강군) | 90,425 | 42,910 | 47,515 | 27,560 | 13,062 | 14,498 | 62,865 | 29,848 | 33,017 |
| Cholwon (철원군) | 62,418 | 29,483 | 32,935 | 13,461 | 6,336 | 7,125 | 48,957 | 23,147 | 25,810 |
| Ichon (이천군) | 57,563 | 27,196 | 30,367 | 12,458 | 5,851 | 6,607 | 45,105 | 21,345 | 23,760 |
| Phangyo (판교군) | 47,031 | 22,108 | 24,923 | 10,024 | 4,691 | 5,333 | 37,007 | 17,417 | 19,590 |
| Popdong (법동군) | 35,119 | 16,552 | 18,567 | 8,609 | 4,055 | 4,554 | 26,510 | 12,497 | 14,013 |
| Chonnae (천내군) | 85,123 | 39,602 | 45,521 | 57,908 | 26,893 | 31,015 | 27,215 | 12,709 | 14,506 |
| Jagang (자강도) | 1,299,830 | 616,828 | 683,002 | 828,253 | 392,660 | 435,593 | 471,577 | 224,168 | 247,409 |
| Kanggye City (강계시) | 251,971 | 120,305 | 131,666 | 251,971 | 120,305 | 131,666 | - | - | - |
| Manpho City (만포시) | 116,760 | 55,366 | 61,394 | 82,631 | 39,202 | 43,429 | 34,129 | 16,164 | 17,965 |
| Huichon City (희천시) | 168,180 | 79,776 | 88,404 | 136,093 | 64,547 | 71,546 | 32,087 | 15,229 | 16,858 |
| Rangrim (랑림군) | 36,481 | 17,437 | 19,044 | 15,301 | 7,287 | 8,014 | 21,180 | 10,150 | 11,030 |
| Jonchon (전천군) | 106,311 | 50,201 | 56,110 | 86,877 | 40,943 | 45,934 | 19,434 | 9,258 | 10,176 |
| Songgan (성간군) | 92,952 | 43,738 | 49,214 | 72,116 | 33,966 | 38,150 | 20,836 | 9,772 | 11,064 |
| Janggang (장강군) | 54,601 | 26,013 | 28,588 | 23,196 | 11,001 | 12,195 | 31,405 | 15,012 | 16,393 |
| Hwaphyong (화평군) | 42,183 | 20,092 | 22,091 | 18,569 | 8,850 | 9,719 | 23,614 | 11,242 | 12,372 |
| Junggang (중강군) | 41,022 | 19,344 | 21,678 | 18,793 | 8,829 | 9,964 | 22,229 | 10,515 | 11,714 |
| Jasong (자성군) | 50,939 | 24,216 | 26,723 | 25,407 | 12,042 | 13,365 | 25,532 | 12,174 | 13,358 |
| Sijung (시중군) | 41,842 | 19,840 | 22,002 | 11,257 | 5,229 | 6,028 | 30,585 | 14,611 | 15,974 |
| Wiwon (위원군) | 60,245 | 28,637 | 31,608 | 19,297 | 9,070 | 10,227 | 40,948 | 19,567 | 21,381 |
| Chosan (초산군) | 43,614 | 20,866 | 22,748 | 12,136 | 5,748 | 6,388 | 31,478 | 15,118 | 16,360 |
| Usi (우시군) | 42,919 | 20,176 | 22,743 | 17,138 | 8,095 | 9,043 | 25,781 | 12,081 | 13,700 |
| Kophung (고풍군) | 31,572 | 15,095 | 16,477 | 10,589 | 5,019 | 5,570 | 20,983 | 10,076 | 10,907 |
| Songwon (송원군) | 38,051 | 17,999 | 20,052 | 10,818 | 5,037 | 5,781 | 27,233 | 12,962 | 14,271 |
| Tongsin (동신군) | 47,460 | 22,285 | 25,175 | 8,737 | 4,086 | 4,651 | 38,723 | 18,199 | 20,524 |
| Ryongrim (롱림군) | 32,727 | 15,442 | 17,285 | 7,327 | 3,404 | 3,923 | 25,400 | 12,038 | 13,362 |
| North Phyongan (평안북도) | 2,728,662 | 1,291,443 | 1,437,219 | 1,431,936 | 677,207 | 754,729 | 1,296,726 | 614,236 | 682,490 |
| Sinuiju City (신의주시) | 359,341 | 170,004 | 189,337 | 334,031 | 158,139 | 175,892 | 25,310 | 11,865 | 13,445 |
| Jongju City (정주시) | 189,742 | 89,494 | 100,248 | 102,659 | 48,423 | 54,236 | 87,083 | 41,071 | 46,012 |
| Kusong City (구성시) | 196,515 | 93,212 | 103,303 | 155,181 | 73,677 | 81,504 | 41,334 | 19,535 | 21,799 |
| Pyokdong (벽동군) | 35,601 | 16,945 | 18,656 | 8,525 | 4,031 | 4,494 | 27,076 | 12,914 | 14,162 |
| Phihyon (피현군) | 110,637 | 52,901 | 57,736 | 48,812 | 23,460 | 25,352 | 61,825 | 29,441 | 32,384 |
| Ryongchon (룡천군) | 135,634 | 64,061 | 71,573 | 69,151 | 32,745 | 36,406 | 66,483 | 31,316 | 35,167 |
| Yomju (염주군) | 113,620 | 53,665 | 59,955 | 44,561 | 21,078 | 23,483 | 69,059 | 32,587 | 36,472 |
| Cholwon (철산군) | 85,525 | 40,409 | 45,116 | 29,054 | 13,691 | 15,363 | 56,471 | 26,718 | 29,753 |
| Tongrim (동림군) | 104,614 | 49,410 | 55,204 | 49,151 | 23,169 | 25,982 | 55,463 | 26,241 | 29,222 |
| Sonchon (선천군) | 126,350 | 59,741 | 66,609 | 31,847 | 14,920 | 16,927 | 94,503 | 44,821 | 49,682 |
| Kwaksan (곽산군) | 97,660 | 46,235 | 51,425 | 22,739 | 10,724 | 12,015 | 74,921 | 35,511 | 39,410 |
| Unjon (운전군) | 101,130 | 47,566 | 53,564 | 25,912 | 12,217 | 13,695 | 75,218 | 35,349 | 39,869 |
| Pakchon (박천군) | 98,128 | 46,093 | 52,035 | 29,277 | 13,581 | 15,696 | 68,851 | 32,512 | 36,339 |
| Nyongbyon (녕변군) | 113,852 | 54,007 | 59,845 | 29,998 | 14,090 | 15,908 | 83,854 | 39,917 | 43,937 |
| Kujang (구장군) | 139,337 | 65,457 | 73,880 | 91,900 | 43,034 | 48,866 | 47,437 | 22,423 | 25,014 |
| Hyangsan (향산군) | 52,350 | 24,705 | 27,645 | 22,657 | 10,628 | 12,029 | 29,693 | 14,077 | 15,616 |
| Unsan (운산군) | 102,928 | 48,907 | 54,021 | 36,482 | 17,291 | 19,191 | 66,446 | 31,616 | 34,830 |
| Thaechon (태천군) | 108,894 | 51,712 | 57,182 | 30,802 | 14,576 | 16,226 | 78,092 | 37,136 | 40,956 |
| Chonma (천마군) | 50,462 | 23,979 | 26,483 | 22,662 | 10,724 | 11,938 | 27,800 | 13,255 | 14,545 |
| Uiju (의주군) | 110,018 | 52,185 | 57,833 | 57,229 | 27,113 | 30,116 | 52,789 | 25,072 | 27,717 |
| Sakju (삭주군) | 159,707 | 75,791 | 83,916 | 119,101 | 56,411 | 62,690 | 40,606 | 19,380 | 21,226 |
| Taegwan (대관군) | 69,565 | 33,374 | 36,191 | 38,274 | 18,478 | 19,796 | 31,291 | 14,896 | 16,395 |
| Changsong (창성군) | 26,577 | 12,574 | 14,003 | 13,187 | 6,228 | 6,959 | 13,390 | 6,346 | 7,044 |
| Tongchang (동창군) | 28,665 | 13,527 | 15,138 | 10,031 | 4,692 | 5,339 | 18,634 | 8,835 | 9,799 |
| Sindo (신도군) | 11,810 | 5,489 | 6,321 | 8,713 | 4,087 | 4,626 | 3,097 | 1,402 | 1,695 |
| South Phyongan (평안남도) | 4,051,696 | 1,928,935 | 2,122,761 | 2,629,943 | 1,253,805 | 1,376,138 | 1,421,753 | 675,130 | 746,623 |
| Phyongsong City (평성시) | 284,386 | 138,687 | 145,699 | 236,583 | 115,817 | 120,766 | 47,803 | 22,870 | 24,933 |
| Nampho City (남포시) | 366,815 | 176,767 | 190,048 | 310,864 | 150,091 | 160,773 | 55,951 | 26,676 | 29,275 |
| Anju City (안주시) | 240,117 | 113,526 | 126,591 | 167,646 | 79,187 | 88,459 | 72,471 | 34,339 | 38,132 |
| Kaechon City (개천시) | 319,554 | 151,088 | 168,466 | 262,389 | 124,222 | 138,167 | 57,165 | 26,866 | 30,299 |
| Sunchon City (순천시) | 297,317 | 141,806 | 155,511 | 250,738 | 119,727 | 131,011 | 46,579 | 22,079 | 24,500 |
| Tokchon City (덕천시) | 237,133 | 112,373 | 124,760 | 210,571 | 99,655 | 110,916 | 26,562 | 12,718 | 13,844 |
| Taedong (대동군) | 129,761 | 61,953 | 67,808 | 50,380 | 24,023 | 26,357 | 79,381 | 37,930 | 41,451 |
| Jungsan (증산군) | 113,613 | 54,292 | 59,321 | 23,578 | 11,203 | 12,375 | 90,035 | 43,089 | 46,946 |
| Onchon (온천군) | 149,851 | 71,236 | 78,615 | 83,934 | 39,882 | 44,052 | 65,917 | 31,354 | 34,563 |
| Ryonggang (룡강군) | 58,930 | 27,817 | 31,113 | 20,045 | 9,434 | 10,611 | 38,885 | 18,383 | 20,502 |
| Taean (대안군) | 77,219 | 37,265 | 39,954 | 66,261 | 31,924 | 34,337 | 10,958 | 5,341 | 5,617 |
| Kangso (강서군) | 191,356 | 90,625 | 100,731 | 119,848 | 57,005 | 62,843 | 71,508 | 33,620 | 37,888 |
| Chollima (천리마군) | 139,489 | 66,145 | 73,344 | 102,436 | 48,478 | 53,958 | 37,053 | 17,667 | 19,386 |
| Phyongwon (평원군) | 179,492 | 85,096 | 94,396 | 51,909 | 24,486 | 27,423 | 127,583 | 60,610 | 66,973 |
| Sukchon (숙천군) | 178,509 | 84,552 | 93,957 | 41,377 | 19,466 | 21,911 | 137,132 | 65,086 | 72,046 |
| Mundok (문덕군) | 147,191 | 69,164 | 78,027 | 44,159 | 20,699 | 23,460 | 103,032 | 48,465 | 54,567 |
| Songchon (성천군) | 149,809 | 71,246 | 78,563 | 82,938 | 39,431 | 43,507 | 66,871 | 31,815 | 35,056 |
| Sinyang (신양군) | 59,115 | 28,112 | 31,003 | 28,120 | 13,410 | 14,710 | 30,995 | 14,702 | 16,293 |
| Yangdok (양덕군) | 61,355 | 29,037 | 32,318 | 19,212 | 9,056 | 10,156 | 42,143 | 19,981 | 22,162 |
| Unsan (은산군) | 206,407 | 98,067 | 108,340 | 142,695 | 67,964 | 74,731 | 63,712 | 30,103 | 33,609 |
| Pukchang (북창군) | 139,498 | 66,412 | 73,086 | 111,223 | 52,901 | 58,322 | 28,275 | 13,511 | 14,764 |
| Maengsan (맹산군) | 48,155 | 23,071 | 25,084 | 13,642 | 6,506 | 7,136 | 34,513 | 16,565 | 17,948 |
| Hoechang (회창군) | 89,959 | 42,284 | 47,675 | 56,286 | 26,439 | 29,847 | 33,673 | 15,845 | 17,828 |
| Nyongwon (녕원군) | 30,427 | 14,603 | 15,824 | 11,537 | 5,505 | 6,032 | 18,890 | 9,098 | 9,792 |
| Taehung (대흥군) | 32,915 | 15,584 | 17,331 | 14,362 | 6,776 | 7,586 | 18,553 | 8,808 | 9,745 |
| Chongnam (청남구) | 73,290 | 34,338 | 38,952 | 64,404 | 30,141 | 34,263 | 8,886 | 4,197 | 4,689 |
| Tukjang (득장구) | 50,033 | 23,789 | 26,244 | 42,806 | 20,377 | 22,429 | 7,227 | 3,412 | 3,815 |
| North Hwanghae (황해북도) | 2,113,672 | 1,003,112 | 1,110,560 | 972,632 | 461,240 | 511,392 | 1,141,040 | 541,872 | 599,168 |
| Sariwon City (사리원시) | 307,764 | 147,135 | 160,629 | 271,434 | 130,181 | 141,253 | 36,330 | 16,954 | 19,376 |
| Songrim City (송림시) | 128,831 | 60,634 | 68,197 | 95,878 | 45,035 | 50,843 | 32,953 | 15,599 | 17,354 |
| Kaesong City (개성시) | 308,440 | 146,145 | 162,295 | 192,578 | 90,653 | 101,925 | 115,862 | 55,492 | 60,370 |
| Jangphung (장풍군) | 69,104 | 32,991 | 36,113 | 15,832 | 7,473 | 8,359 | 53,272 | 25,518 | 27,754 |
| Hwangju (황주군) | 155,215 | 73,318 | 81,897 | 35,678 | 16,699 | 18,979 | 119,537 | 56,619 | 62,918 |
| Yonthan (연탄군) | 73,032 | 34,796 | 38,236 | 21,709 | 10,313 | 11,396 | 51,323 | 24,483 | 26,840 |
| Pongsan (봉산군) | 124,745 | 58,668 | 66,077 | 33,063 | 15,588 | 17,475 | 91,682 | 43,080 | 48,602 |
| Unpha (은파군) | 110,988 | 51,914 | 59,074 | 39,645 | 18,511 | 21,134 | 71,343 | 33,403 | 37,940 |
| Rinsan (린산군) | 73,626 | 35,094 | 38,532 | 18,938 | 9,049 | 9,889 | 54,688 | 26,045 | 28,643 |
| Sohung (서흥군) | 100,887 | 47,616 | 53,271 | 29,383 | 13,810 | 15,573 | 71,504 | 33,806 | 37,698 |
| Suan (수안군) | 76,890 | 36,709 | 40,181 | 22,615 | 10,734 | 11,881 | 54,275 | 25,975 | 28,300 |
| Yonsan (연산군) | 66,568 | 31,543 | 35,025 | 32,976 | 15,597 | 17,379 | 33,592 | 15,946 | 17,646 |
| Sinphyong (신평군) | 63,727 | 30,234 | 33,493 | 32,519 | 15,252 | 17,267 | 31,208 | 14,982 | 16,226 |
| Koksan (곡산군) | 120,693 | 57,252 | 63,441 | 16,301 | 7,755 | 8,546 | 104,392 | 49,497 | 54,895 |
| Sinkye (신계군) | 78,573 | 37,153 | 41,420 | 24,183 | 11,294 | 12,889 | 54,390 | 25,859 | 28,531 |
| Phyongsan (평산군) | 123,646 | 59,480 | 64,166 | 57,601 | 28,087 | 29,514 | 66,045 | 31,393 | 34,652 |
| Kumchon (금천군) | 68,216 | 32,494 | 35,722 | 16,035 | 7,552 | 8,483 | 52,181 | 24,942 | 27,239 |
| Thosan (토산군) | 62,727 | 29,936 | 32,791 | 16,264 | 7,657 | 8,607 | 46,463 | 22,279 | 24,184 |
| South Hwanghae (황해남도) | 2,310,485 | 1,090,956 | 1,219,529 | 821,954 | 388,804 | 433,150 | 1,488,531 | 702,152 | 786,379 |
| Haeju City (해주시) | 273,300 | 131,554 | 141,746 | 241,599 | 116,594 | 125,005 | 31,701 | 14,960 | 16,741 |
| Kangryong (강령군) | 106,827 | 50,342 | 56,485 | 38,729 | 18,180 | 20,549 | 68,098 | 32,162 | 35,936 |
| Ongjin (옹진군) | 152,878 | 71,997 | 80,881 | 66,263 | 30,991 | 35,272 | 86,615 | 41,006 | 45,609 |
| Thaethan (태탄군) | 64,258 | 30,351 | 33,907 | 17,351 | 8,178 | 9,173 | 46,907 | 22,173 | 24,734 |
| Jangyon (장연군) | 91,422 | 42,885 | 48,537 | 43,542 | 20,234 | 23,308 | 47,880 | 22,651 | 25,229 |
| Samchon (삼천군) | 86,042 | 40,596 | 45,446 | 26,734 | 12,482 | 14,252 | 59,308 | 28,114 | 31,194 |
| Songhwa (송화군) | 44,274 | 20,917 | 23,357 | 13,936 | 6,623 | 7,313 | 30,338 | 14,294 | 16,044 |
| Unryul (은률군) | 107,997 | 50,759 | 57,238 | 33,947 | 15,813 | 18,134 | 74,050 | 34,946 | 39,104 |
| Unchon (은천군) | 95,597 | 44,864 | 50,733 | 20,164 | 9,480 | 10,684 | 75,433 | 35,384 | 40,049 |
| Anak (안악군) | 125,924 | 58,870 | 67,054 | 28,314 | 13,288 | 15,026 | 97,610 | 45,582 | 52,028 |
| Sinchon (신천군) | 141,407 | 66,406 | 75,001 | 33,702 | 15,733 | 17,969 | 107,705 | 50,673 | 57,032 |
| Jaeryong (재령군) | 125,631 | 59,212 | 66,419 | 39,387 | 18,686 | 20,701 | 86,244 | 40,526 | 45,718 |
| Sinwon (신원군) | 83,161 | 38,970 | 44,191 | 26,321 | 12,261 | 14,060 | 56,840 | 26,709 | 30,131 |
| Pongchon (봉천군) | 79,740 | 37,795 | 41,945 | 18,273 | 8,639 | 9,634 | 61,467 | 29,156 | 32,311 |
| Paechon (배천군) | 159,825 | 75,598 | 84,227 | 40,316 | 18,953 | 21,363 | 119,509 | 56,645 | 62,864 |
| Yonan (연안군) | 158,845 | 75,005 | 83,840 | 28,097 | 13,039 | 15,058 | 130,748 | 61,966 | 68,782 |
| Chongdan (청단군) | 142,607 | 67,478 | 75,129 | 34,045 | 16,165 | 17,880 | 108,562 | 51,313 | 57,249 |
| Ryongchon (룡천군) | 90,102 | 42,324 | 47,778 | 28,052 | 13,182 | 14,870 | 62,050 | 29,142 | 32,908 |
| Kwail (과일군) | 89,895 | 42,213 | 47,682 | 22,519 | 10,540 | 11,979 | 67,376 | 31,673 | 35,703 |
| Phyoksong (벽성군) | 90,753 | 42,820 | 47,933 | 20,663 | 9,743 | 10,920 | 70,090 | 33,077 | 37,013 |
| Pyongyang (평양시) | 3,255,288 | 1,549,778 | 1,705,510 | 2,823,414 | 1,347,210 | 1,476,204 | 431,874 | 202,568 | 229,306 |
| Central Dist. (중구역) | 131,333 | 66,371 | 64,962 | 131,333 | 66,371 | 64,962 | - | - | - |
| Mangyongdae Dist. (만경대구역) | 321,690 | 153,551 | 168,139 | 315,955 | 150,794 | 165,161 | 5,735 | 2,757 | 2,978 |
| Sonkyo Dist. (선교구역) | 148,209 | 68,976 | 79,233 | 148,209 | 68,976 | 79,233 | - | - | - |
| Phyongchon Dist. (평천구역) | 181,142 | 86,225 | 94,917 | 181,142 | 86,225 | 94,917 | - | - | - |
| Tongdaewon Dist. (동대원구역) | 143,561 | 69,566 | 73,995 | 143,561 | 69,566 | 73,995 | - | - | - |
| Ryongsong Dist.(룡성구역) | 195,891 | 93,106 | 102,785 | 195,891 | 93,106 | 102,785 | - | - | - |
| Unjong Dist. (은정구역) | 47,569 | 23,831 | 23,738 | 47,569 | 23,831 | 23,738 | - | - | - |
| Taesong Dist. (대성구역) | 115,739 | 55,922 | 59,817 | 115,739 | 55,922 | 59,817 | - | - | - |
| Moranbong Dist. (모란봉구역) | 143,404 | 68,129 | 75,275 | 143,404 | 68,129 | 75,275 | - | - | - |
| Sosong Dist. (서성구역) | 147,138 | 70,556 | 76,582 | 147,138 | 70,556 | 76,582 | - | - | - |
| Pothonggang Dist. (보통강구역) | 105,180 | 50,423 | 54,757 | 105,180 | 50,423 | 54,757 | - | - | - |
| Taedonggang Dist. (대동강구역) | 207,081 | 99,444 | 107,637 | 207,081 | 99,444 | 107,637 | - | - | - |
| Sadong Dist. (사동구역) | 140,869 | 66,600 | 74,269 | 101,285 | 47,904 | 53,381 | 39,584 | 18,696 | 20,888 |
| Hyongjesan Dist. (형제산구역) | 160,032 | 75,785 | 84,247 | 145,772 | 69,087 | 76,685 | 14,260 | 6,698 | 7,562 |
| Sunan Dist. (순안구역) | 91,791 | 43,143 | 48,648 | 44,229 | 20,810 | 23,419 | 47,562 | 22,333 | 25,229 |
| Samsok Dist. (삼석구역) | 62,790 | 29,695 | 33,095 | 31,755 | 15,068 | 16,687 | 31,035 | 14,627 | 16,408 |
| Sungho Dist. (승호구역) | 85,624 | 40,044 | 45,580 | 59,291 | 27,744 | 31,547 | 26,333 | 12,300 | 14,033 |
| Ryokpho Dist. (력포구역) | 82,548 | 38,432 | 44,116 | 60,922 | 28,366 | 32,556 | 21,626 | 10,066 | 11,560 |
| Rakrang Dist. (락랑구역) | 282,681 | 134,766 | 147,915 | 255,620 | 121,443 | 134,177 | 27,061 | 13,323 | 13,738 |
| Kangnam (강남군) | 69,279 | 32,144 | 37,135 | 19,254 | 9,053 | 10,201 | 50,025 | 23,091 | 26,934 |
| Junghwa (중화군) | 77,367 | 36,156 | 41,211 | 26,771 | 12,550 | 14,221 | 50,596 | 23,606 | 26,990 |
| Sangwon (상원군) | 92,831 | 43,021 | 49,810 | 35,941 | 16,764 | 19,177 | 56,890 | 26,257 | 30,633 |
| Kangdong (강동군) | 221,539 | 103,892 | 117,647 | 160,372 | 75,078 | 85,294 | 61,167 | 28,814 | 32,353 |

== See also ==
- Demographics of North Korea

== Notes and references ==
=== References ===
- "D P R Korea 2008 Population Census National Report" (PDF). Central Bureau of Statistics. 2009. Archived from the original (PDF) on 31 March 2010.
