= Central Bureau of Statistics (North Korea) =

North Korea's principal government institution in charge of statistics and census data

Bureau overview
- Formed: 1952; 74 years ago
- Jurisdiction: Government of North Korea
- Headquarters: Inhung-Dong, Moranbong District, Pyongyang, North Korea
- Employees: Not known
- Bureau executive: Ri Sung-ho, Director General
- Parent department: Cabinet of North Korea

Korean name
- Hangul: 조선 중앙 통계국
- Hanja: 朝鮮 中央 統計局
- RR: Joseon jungang tonggyeguk
- MR: Chosŏn chungang t'onggyeguk

Central Bureau of Statistics (CBS; Korean: 조선 중앙 통계국; also known as the Central Statistic Bureau, or the Central Statistical Bureau) is the national statistical office of North Korea.

Recent censuses of North Korea have been conducted by CBS. It has also published statistics about electricity.

Very little is known about the bureau or its staff, and even its ability to compose accurate statistics is in dispute. Their accuracy has been disputed by various United Nations organizations and foreign observers.

== History ==
The Central Bureau of Statistics (CBS) was founded in 1952 under the State Planning Commission of North Korea, but the relationship between these two organizations today is not known.

CBS held the first North Korean census in 1989. Before that, the most up-to-date population figures were available from 1963.

Usually, statistical affairs in North Korea are run by the Bureau, but some statistics such as those pertaining to the total population and mortality, are done by a separate organization called the Population Division, which was founded in 1993 in time for the 1993 census. Before the census, the CBS tallied the population based on numbers in the "population registration system" maintained by local administrative levels.

The newest North Korean census in 2008 was carried out by the CBS, and the next one was scheduled for 2018. It also makes statistics about the country's energy.

== Organization ==
CBS is the national statistical office of North Korea. It is headquartered in Inhung-Dong of Moranbong District of the capital, Pyongyang. It has branches in all provinces. Its Director General since 2014 is Ri Sung-ho. He was preceded by Kim Chang-su, who was formerly the Director of the Bureau since March 1990 before becoming its Director General in March 1996. Before him, Shin Gyeon-sik was the Director General since May 1990.

The Bureau is part of the state planning apparatus by reporting directly to the Administrative Council. The Bureau is directly under the Cabinet of North Korea.

== Criticism ==
The abilities of the Bureau to compile accurate statistics are "an open question". Although the Bureau was founded to collect data for the purposes of administration and economic control, it is unclear if it has access to information about all sectors of the North Korean economy today. Nothing is known about the number and training of its staff. Since the late 1960s, the Bureau has published a mere two reports. Kim Il Sung himself asserted that statistics compiled by the Bureau are subject to national security considerations and, as such, are not inherently public.

Nicholas Eberstadt illustrates the Bureau's problem with low-quality statistics based on his exchange with its officials in 1990: "In trying to ascertain the definition of an 'urban area' in the DPRK, it soon became clear that there was, in fact, no standard specification demarcating 'urban' and 'rural' communities". Instead, populated places are classified as rural or urban on an ad hoc basis. According to Eberstadt, while CBS officials recognized the shortcomings of their methods, one official resorted to joking about his organization being tasked with mere "rubber statistics".

In 1989 it sent population data to the United Nations Population Fund to secure help in organizing the first national census since independence in 1948. These figures might have been purposely distorted. In 1997, North Korea sent GNP per capita statistics compiled by the Bureau to the UN Budget and Finance Committee in the hopes of lowering its United Nations membership fee. Just a year later, the Bureau reported very different statistics to secure funding from two other UN agencies, the United Nations Development Programme and the International Monetary Fund. In 2002, it sent data about the nutrition of infants and mothers to UNICEF and WFP. These figures, though excluding some large populated areas, showed such remarkable improvement in nutrition that they were doubted in the UN organizations. In spite of the controversy, the figures were eventually accepted.

According to Aidan Foster-Carter, a fellow at Leeds University:

Normal countries publish figures. Even less than normal countries manage a few. The numbers may be lousy, or indeed lies, but this is what states do; for their own self-respect, because the World Bank and International Monetary Fund (IMF) insist upon it and above all, because without numbers no one can be sure what is really going on, and so how can investors or other economic actors commit themselves and make meaningful market decisions? Therefore, when the DPRK (Democratic People's Republic of Korea) Central Statistics Bureau starts doing its job in public, then (and only then) will we know that reform in North Korea is for real and irreversible.

== See also ==
- 1993 North Korea Census
- 2008 North Korea Census
- Demographics of North Korea
- Economy of North Korea
- Energy in North Korea
- International rankings of North Korea
- Jangmadang
- Songbun
