= 1993 North Korean census =

December 31, 1993	2008 →

General information
- Country: North Korea
- Authority: Central Bureau of Statistics

Results
- Total population: 21,213,478

The 1993 North Korean census (Korean: 1993년 조선민주주의인민공화국 인구일제조사) was a census conducted by the Central Bureau of Statistics of North Korea on 31 December 1993. It was the first census held in North Korea since the founding of the country in 1949, for which Beijing provided technical assistance to Pyongyang.

The population of the country, according to this census, was 21,213,478, with a predominantly urban population, with the highest population density in the western and southwestern regions of Pyongyang, Nampo, South Hwanghae Province, and North Pyongan Province. The life expectancy at birth was of 70.7 years (67.8 for males and 73.9 for females). In addition, more than 11.8 million people in the country were in the labour force, an estimated 56% of the total population, and 691,027 were in the military, or 3.3% of the total population.

== Inconsistencies ==
The census was inconsistent internally and in comparison to previous censuses. According to the American political economist, Nicholas Eberstadt: "Quotation marks should attend the '1993' census because that enumeration was not actually conducted in 1993, but rather in early 1994, with respondents replying to questions about their circumstances as of year-end 1993; needless to say, such a procedure is highly unorthodox."

== Stats ==
By province	1993			
By province	Total	Men	Woman	Sex-ratio
Pyongyang	2,741,260	1,302,598	1,438,662	90.54
South Pyongan Province	2,866,109	1,357,565	1,508,544	89.99
North Pyongan Province	2,404,490	1,132,679	1,271,811	89.06
Chagang Province	1,152,733	547,413	605,320	90.43
South Hwanghae Province	2,010,953	942,717	1,068,236	88.25
North Hwanghae Province	1,512,060	707,211	804,849	87.87
Kangwon Province	1,304,481	608,921	695,560	87.54
South Hamgyong Province	2,732,232	1,281,001	1,451,231	88.27
North Hamgyong Province	2,060,725	975,575	1,085,150	89.90
Ryanggang Province	638,475	303,319	335,156	90.50
Kaesong	334,433	155,810	178,623	87.23
Nampo	731,448	347,369	384,079	90.44
Hyangsan	32,952	15,485	17,467	88.65
Active Duty Military	691,027			
DPRK National	21,213,378	10,329,699	10,883,679	94.91

== See also ==
- Demographics of North Korea
- 2008 North Korea Census
