= List of companies of Bahrain =

Location of Bahrain

Bahrain is a small Arab monarchy with the first post-oil economy in the Persian Gulf region. Since the late 20th century, Bahrain has invested in the banking and tourism sectors. Many large financial institutions have a presence in Manama, the country's capital. Bahrain has a high Human Development Index and was recognised by the World Bank as a high income economy.

== Notable firms ==
This list includes notable companies with primary headquarters located in the country. The industry and sector follow the Industry Classification Benchmark taxonomy. Organizations which have ceased operations are included and noted as defunct.

Notable companies Status: P=Private, S=State; A=Active, D=Defunct
Name	Industry	Sector	Headquarters	Founded	Notes	Status	
ABC Islamic Bank	Financials	Banks	Manama	1998	Islamic bank	P	A
Al Baraka Banking Group	Financials	Banks	Manama	1978	Investment banking	P	A
Al Muntazah	Consumer services	Food retailers & wholesalers	Muharraq	1984	Supermarket chain	P	A
Aluminium Bahrain	Basic materials	Aluminum	Askar	1968	Aluminium products	P	A
Bank ABC	Financials	Banks	Manama	1980	Bank	P	A
Bahrain Air	Consumer services	Airlines	Muharraq	2008	Airline, defunct 2013	P	D
Bahrain Bourse	Financials	Investment services	Manama	1987	Primary Bahrain stock exchange	P	A
Bahrain Petroleum Company	Oil & gas	Exploration & production	Awali	1929	National oil company	S	A
Banagas	Oil & gas	Exploration & production	Southern Governorate	1979	Natural gas	P	A
Bank of Bahrain and Kuwait	Financials	Banks	Manama	1971	Bank	P	A
Batelco	Telecommunications	Mobile telecommunications	Hamala	1981	Mobile and fixed	P	A
BMMI	Consumer services	Food retailers & wholesalers	Sitra	1883	Retail group	P	A
Central Bank of Bahrain	Financials	Banks	Manama	1973	Central bank	S	A
DHL International Aviation ME	Industrials	Delivery services	Muharraq	1979	Cargo carrier	P	A
Fakhro Group	Conglomerates	-	Manama	1888	Automotive, industrial, technology, restaurants, shipping	P	A
Gulf Air	Consumer services	Airlines	Muharraq	1950	Flag carrier airline	S	A
Gulf Aviation	Consumer services	Airlines	Muharraq	1949	Airline, defunct 1974, now part of Gulf Air	P	D
Gulf Traveller	Consumer services	Airlines	Manama	2003	Airline, defunct 2007	P	D
Investcorp	Financials	Nonequity investment instruments	Manama	1982	Investments	P	A
Khaleeji Commercial Bank	Financials	Banks	Manama	2004	Retail bank	P	A
Mumtalakat Holding Company	Financials	Real estate holding & development	Manama	2005	Holding company	S	A
Nass Corporation	Industrials	Heavy construction	Manama	1963	Construction	P	A
National Bank of Bahrain	Financials	Banks	Manama	1957	Bank	P	A
T’azur Company	Financials	Full line insurance	Manama	2007	Islamic insurance products	P	A
The Benefit Company	Financials	Financial services	Manama	1997	Money movement	P	A
Western Gulf Advisory	Financials	Asset managers	Manama	2008	Asset management, defunct 2011	P	D

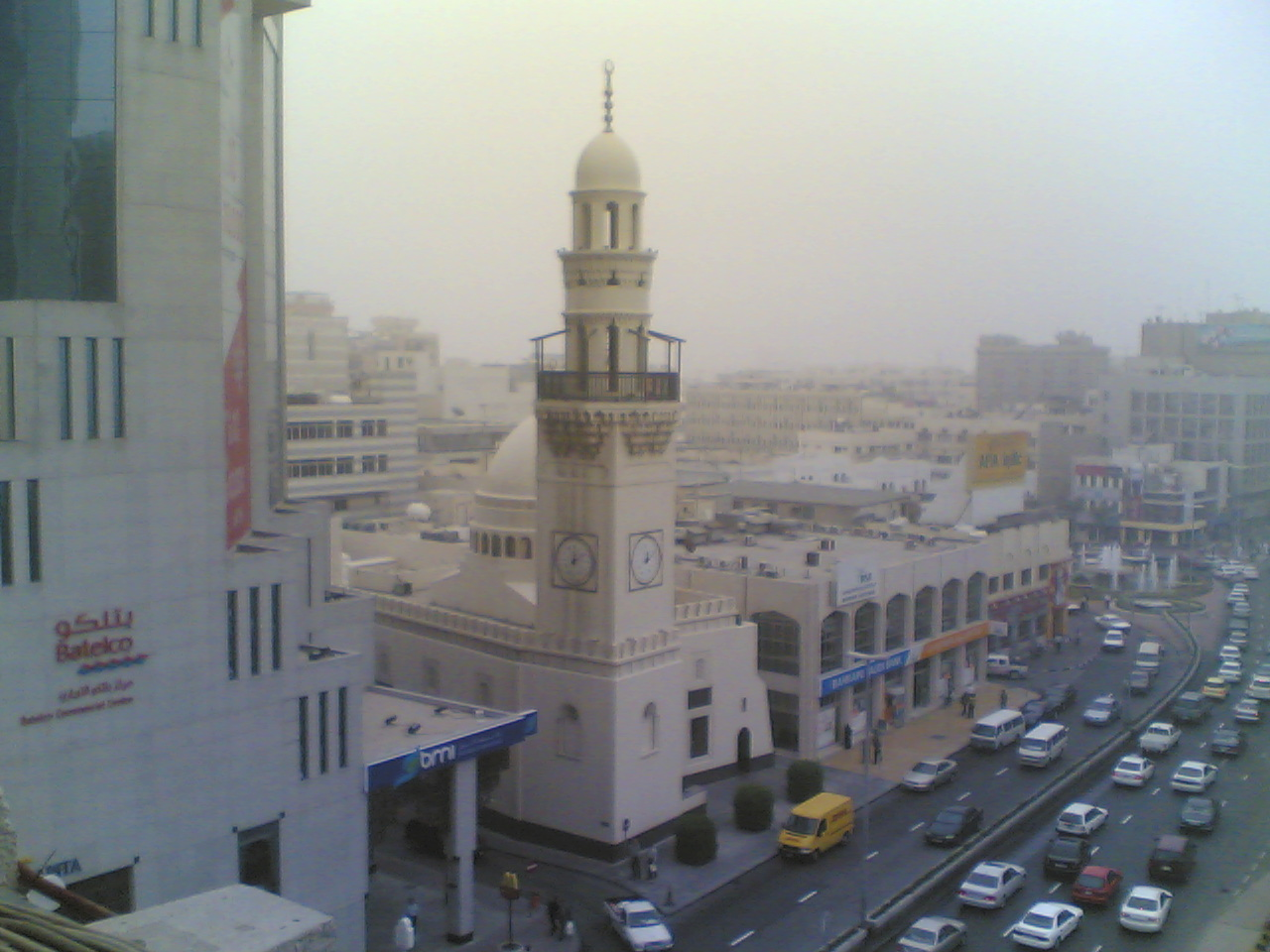
Central Manama business district

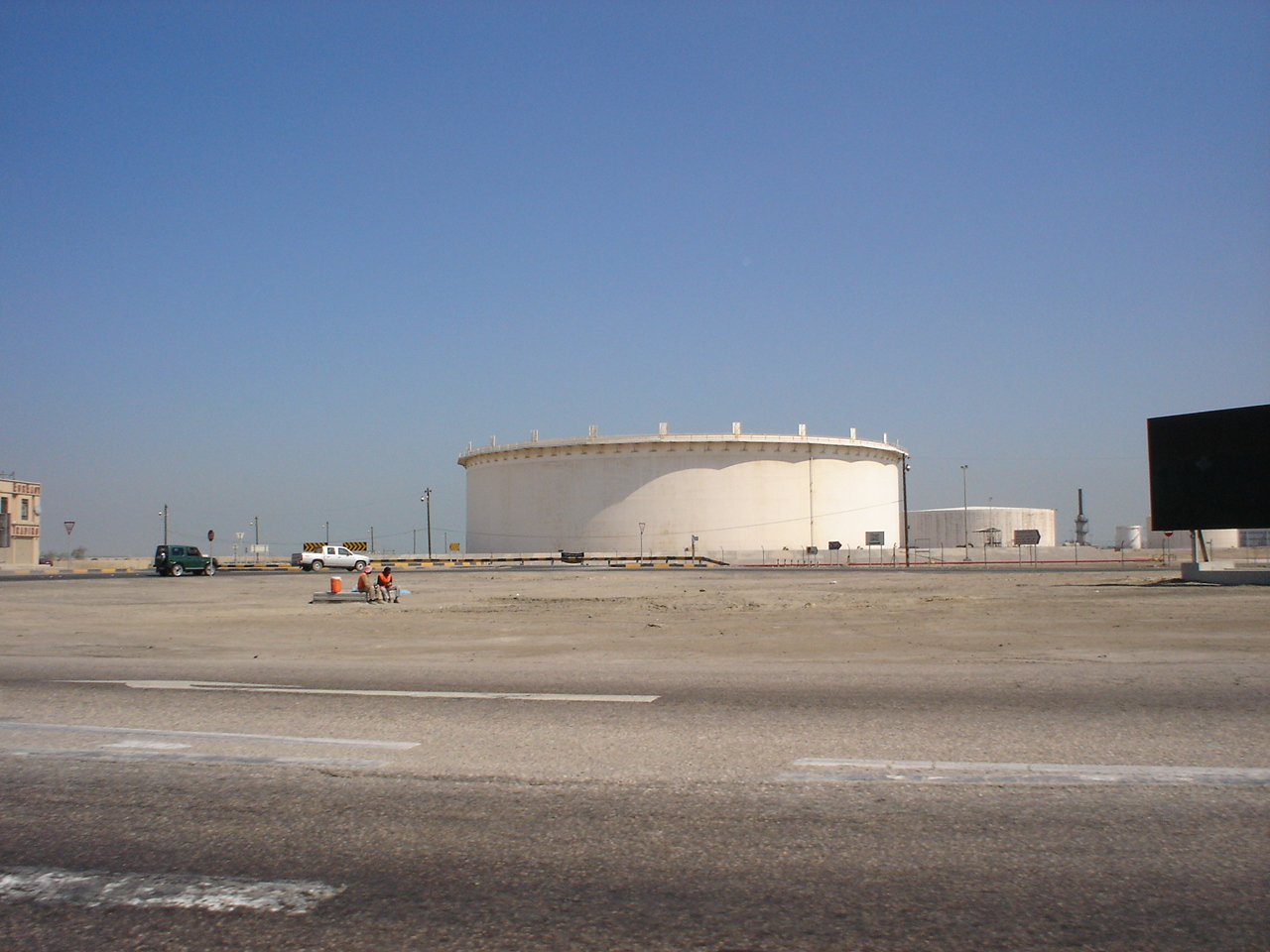
Bahrain Petroleum Company oil reserve tanks

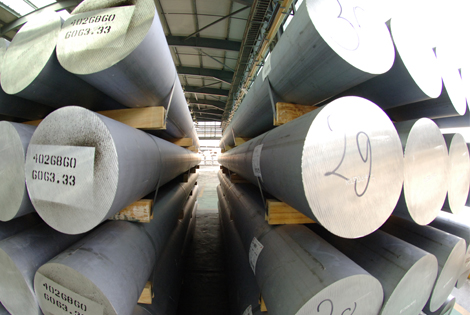
Aluminium extrusion billets at an Aluminium Bahrain facility

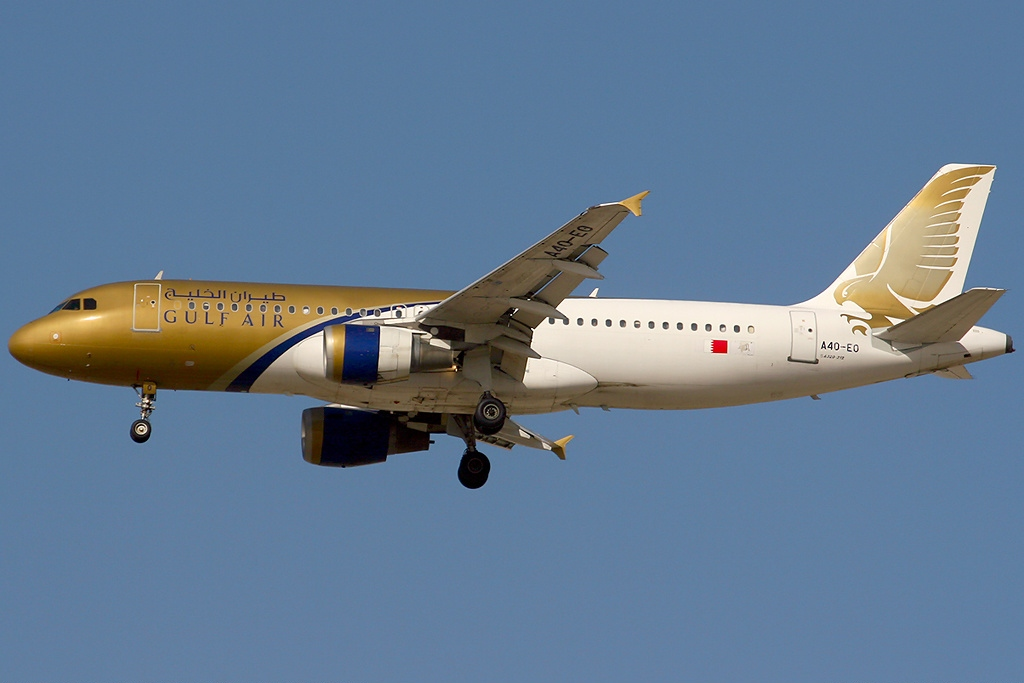
Gulf Air Airbus A320-200

== See also ==
- List of banks in Bahrain
- List of supermarket chains in Bahrain
- List of shopping malls in Bahrain
