= GFH Financial Group =

Islamic investment bank of Bahrain

GFH
- Company type: Public
- Traded as: BHSE:GFH; DFM: GFH
- Founded: 1999; 27 years ago
- Headquarters: Bahrain Financial Harbour, Manama, Bahrain
- Area served: Middle East
- Key people: Hisham Alrayes (CEO)
- Services: Investment banking
- Divisions: Wealth Management; Commercial Banking; Asset Management; Real estate investment
- Subsidiaries: GFH Capital
- Website: gfh.com

GFH Financial Group, previously known as Gulf Finance House, is an Islamic investment bank with headquarters in Bahrain Financial Harbour, Bahrain.

One of its most notable investments was a 25% stake in the English football club Leeds United through their wholly owned subsidiary, Dubai-based GFH Capital, having initially acquired 100% ownership of the club from Ken Bates in December 2012. On 7 February 2014 GFH Capital announced that they had exchanged contracts for the sale of Leeds to Massimo Cellino's family consortium 'Eleonora Sport Ltd'. The deal saw the Cellino family acquire a 75% ownership of the club in April 2014 after winning an appeal against the Football League's decision initially to block the sale. When Andrea Radrizzani bought the club, GFH sold all of their shares in Leeds United in May of 2017. Salem Patel, a non executive director of GFH, created an account on a popular Leeds United fan forum, named ‘Melas’ (Salem, backwards) to ask question about signing players and to share positive news about GFH with the fans. This was exposed fairly quickly and fans protested against their ownership and the ownership of Massimo Cellino on many occasions including marches and mock funerals outside of the club’s stadium.

== History ==
GFH was established in the Kingdom of Bahrain in 1999 under a license granted by the Central Bank of Bahrain (CBB). In 2014, GFH was listed on the Bahrain Stock Exchange, Kuwait Stock Exchange and Dubai Financial Market. In 2007, GFH listed its GDR on the London Stock Exchange.

In November 2014, GFH converted into a financial group and was renamed as GFH Financial Group.

== Services ==
GFH's business lines cover aspects of financial services, from financial and investments to commercial banking operations. GFH's range of activities are Real Estate Development, Commercial Banking, Wealth Management and Asset Management. GFH splits its asset management activities into two areas: Corporate Investment and Real Estate Investment.

== Investments ==
=== Real estate development projects ===
- Royal Ranches Marrakech
- Energy City Qatar
- GFH Mumbai Economic Development Zone
- Energy City Libya
- Tunis Financial Harbor
- Bahrain Financial Harbour

=== Corporate investment projects ===
- Khaleeji Commercial Bank (KHCB)
- Philadelphia Private School, Dubai
- Leeds United Football Club
- Cemena Investment Company
- Al Basha’er GCC Equity Fund
- Injazat Technology Fund

=== Real estate investment ===
- Diversified US Residential Portfolio, USA
- 42 Queens Gate Gardens
- UK and Gulf Atlantic Real Estate, UK
- SQ Asset Management, USA

== See also ==
- List of banks in Bahrain
