= SMS Pro =

Software package

SMS Pro is an aviation safety management systems software package providing a web based SMS application, SMS training, and tools for aviation service providers to manage safety, security, quality, and quality issues worldwide.

SMS Pro is modeled after ICAO advisory material and the Four Pillars of SMS, and serves aviation service providers worldwide. SMS Pro has been headquartered in Anchorage Alaska since 2004.

== Operations ==
SMS Pro is headquartered in Anchorage, Alaska, but provides SMS and risk management training all around the globe. They provide compliance guidance and other risk management educational material to providers based on guidance from major civil aviation authorities, including ICAO, FAA, Transport Canada, IS-BAO, and EASA.

SMS Pro is managed by NorthWest Data Solutions, which also develops commercial databases and web software.

== Clients ==
SMS Pro was designed specifically for aviation safety management, and has been adopted by airports, airlines, maintenance repair organizations, flight schools, quasi-military/police and private aircraft operators.

While SMS Pro is one of the most recognized SMS software applications within the aviation industry, there has been no adoption outside of the aviation industry as of 2018. Industry references are only found within aviation, under the aviation software categories.

== Technology ==
SMS Pro is a web-based application based on Microsoft .NET platform using a MS SQL Server database. SMS Pro has recently made efforts to be adopted as part of State Safety Programs, but as of yet no State Safety Programs have been created.

== Scholarship ==
SMS Pro provides two $1,000 scholarships each year to students participating in aviation safety courses.
