= Ahmed bin Mohamed Al Khalifa =

Minister of Finance and Economy of Bahrain
- In office January 2005 – November 2018
- Monarch: Hamad bin Isa Al Khalifa
- Preceded by: Abdulla Hassan Saif
- Succeeded by: Salman bin Khalifa Al Khalifa

H.E. Sheikh Ahmed bin Mohammed Al Khalifa is a member of Bahrain's ruling Al Khalifa family.

Ahmed earned a Master's degree in Business Management from St. Edward's University in 1986.

Ahmed was Director of the Bahrain Stock Exchange. He served as the Governor of the Bahrain Monetary Agency from 2002 to January 2005. He was the Minister of Finance from January 2005 to December 2018. He also oversaw oil and gas affairs from July 2012 to December 2014.

Ahmed was appointed Auditor-General of the National Audit Office of Bahrain in May 2019.
