= Banco ABC Brasil =

Brazilian commercial and investment bank

Banco ABC Brasil S.A.
- Formerly: Banco ABC Roma S.A.
- Type: Public company
- Industry: Financial services
- Founded: 1989
- Headquarters: São Paulo, Brazil
- Parent: Arab Banking Corporation
- Website: www.abcbrasil.com.br

Banco ABC Brasil S.A. is a Brazilian commercial and investment bank. It is headquartered in São Paulo and controlled by Bahrain-based Arab Banking Corporation (Bank ABC).

== History ==
Arab Banking Corporation and Grupo Roberto Marinho established Banco ABC Roma as a joint venture in 1989. The bank adopted the name Banco ABC Brasil in 1997, when Arab Banking Corporation acquired Grupo Roberto Marinho's stake. It completed its initial public offering in July 2007, listing its preferred shares on the Brazilian stock exchange in the Level 2 corporate governance segment.

Investment banking operations began in 2013, initially in debt capital markets and mergers and acquisitions. The bank extended its lending in 2019 to middle-market companies with annual revenues between R$30 million and R$300 million.

== Financials ==
In February 2025, its shares fell by more than 5% after its 4th-quarter 2024 results, which showed rising delinquency among middle-market borrowers and loan-loss provisions of R$97.6 million. Provisions were up 67.9% from a year earlier.

Recurring net income was R$226 million in the first quarter of 2025, down 7.2% from the previous quarter. The bank's expanded credit portfolio grew 11.4% year-on-year. BB Investimentos said lower financial margins and fee income partly explained the fall in net income.

The bank lowered its forecast for annual credit portfolio growth from 7–12% to 1–4% in its third-quarter 2025 results, while its return on equity rose to 15.5%.

In the second quarter of 2026, the bank recorded recurring net income of R$257.3 million, up 5.4% year-on-year. Financial margins increased by 9.1%, and service revenue fell 9%.
