= Evolution of management systems =

This article outlines the evolution of management systems. A management system is the framework of processes and procedures used to ensure that an organization can fulfill all tasks required to achieve its objectives.

After World War II, the reigning paradigm of product-oriented mass production had reached its peak. Examples of management systems at that time are linear assembly lines, organizational hierarchies of command, product quality control and mass consumption.

Soon afterwards, the Deming-Juran process-quality teachings spearheaded a new quality orientation (later referred to as Total quality management) and propelled Japan directly to the post-war process focus (process quality control, just-in-time, continuous improvement). The US responded by a painful and prolonged product-to-process transformation, ultimately leveling the playing field again by the mid-1980s.

At the end of the 1980s, business process reengineering focused on the radical redesign of the production process through the reintegration of task, labor and knowledge. As a result, lean, flexible and streamlined production processes were created, capable of fast response and internet-based integration necessary for the upcoming phase of supply chains - business-to-business (B2B) – as well as demand chains – business-to-customer (B2C).

In the above three stages of evolution of management systems, the competitive advantage was derived almost exclusively from the internal resources of the firm. At the end of the 1980s, a radical fourth shift has occurred: the competitive advantage became increasingly derived from the external resources of the firm – through the extended networks of suppliers and customers.

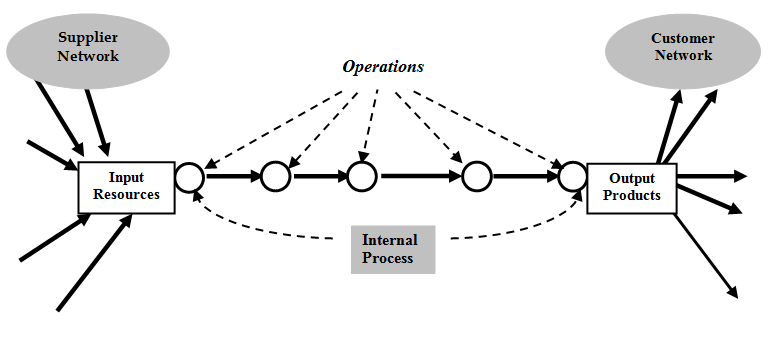
Figure 1: Basic scheme: product, process, external networks

Figure 1 refers to the basic scheme of production and service delivery process. It represents the traditional linear input-process-output management system. This system has been fixed and unchanging for centuries. The only change has been in terms of changing focus on individual components of the system, emphasizing different parts of this basic scheme.

Although the scheme itself (inputs → process → outputs) remains mostly unchallenged, there are some indications that this business model will undergo major restructurings in the future (in the emerging stages of evolution of management systems). It will become disaggregated and distributed, subjected to non-linear modularity and bringing forth new ways of making things and delivering services. Then it will become reintegrated again, tying together globally distributed components into a unified recycling whole.

== Early stages ==
All early stages are characterized by changing focus of attention within the unchanging, invariant scheme of Figure 1. The management system has typically focused on:

=== Final product ===
The final product is a primary focus, the production process is considered secondary. Its operations and their sequences are technologically fixed or ‘given’. Product quality is ‘inspected in’, mostly at the end of the process. Statistical quality control, inventory control, cost minimization, mass production, assembly line, work specialization, hierarchies of command, mass consumption, statistical mass markets and forecasting are among the defining characteristics of this stage.

=== Partitioned process ===
It is the high-quality process that assures the high-quality product. The main focus was on improving of process operations. Quality of the process was understood as the quality of its operations. Powerful new concepts of Total Quality Management (TQM), Continuous Improvement Process (Kaizen) and Just-In-Time (JIT) systems have characterized this stage. Although the operations were being improved, the process architecture and structural sequencing were kept intact and remained technologically ‘given’.

=== Integrated process ===
The focus of attention shifted from operations (circles) to linkages (arrows) – thus changing the process architecture itself. The reengineering of the process, re-integrating individual components into effective, more autonomous and even self-manageable wholes, has characterized this stage. The production process became a business process and therefore subject to qualitative redesign and reengineering (BPR). Discontinuous improvement and process innovation replaced the piecemeal continuous improvement. Traditional vertical hierarchies of command have flattened out into more horizontal, process-oriented networks. Mass customization, disintermediation, knowledge management and autonomous teams have started emerging.

== Extended process ==
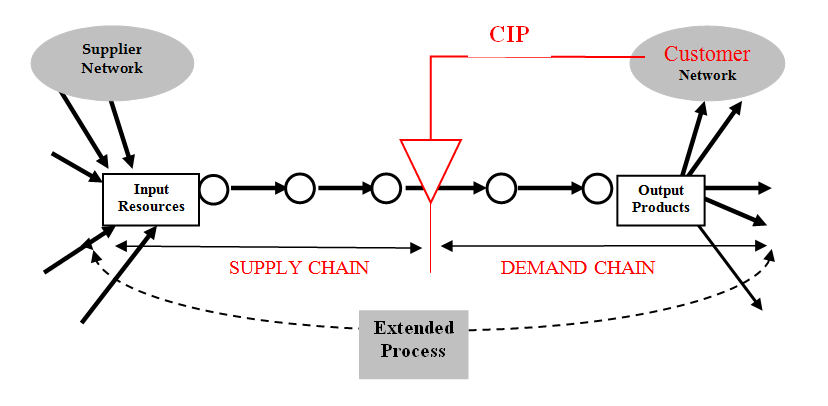
Figure 2: Extended process and Customer Intervention Point

Figure 2 refers to the paradigmatic shift from internal processes expanded into the extended process – including supplier networks and alliances as well as customer self-service, mass customization and disintermediation – as the increasingly external sources of competitive advantage.

In the extended-process model, supplier networks and customer communities are integrated with an organization's internal processes. Internal and external knowledge can contribute to organizational capabilities, while supply- and demand-chain management may vary according to the customer intervention point (CIP). Intranets and extranets have provided a communication medium for B2B and B2C exchanges. Performance is evaluated using factors such as quality, cost, speed, and reliability.

== Distributed process ==
Through the global sourcing, sections and components of the internal process are being outsourced to external providers and contractors in search of the highest added value contribution. Long-term alliances are formed and companies are transforming themselves into networks. Network cooperation is replacing corporate competition: coopetition emerges.

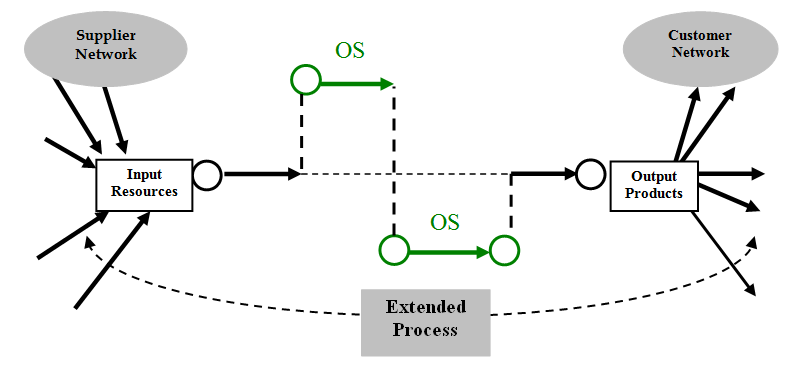
Figure 3: Distributed process and Outsourcing

Different parts of the extended process are geographically distributed and often spatially remote. In Figure 3, this distribution is represented by sections OS of the process which have been outsourced to higher added-value providers.

The evolutionary process is accelerating, driven by a global search for maximum added value, and management systems paradigm is becoming a new dynamic source of competitive advantage. Radically distributed supply and demand chains of Stage 5 are coordinated and reintegrated on a global scale. The search for added value, after exploring traditional global resources, is now turning towards reuse, recycling, recovery and remanufacturing as new sources of maximizing added value.

== Recycled process ==
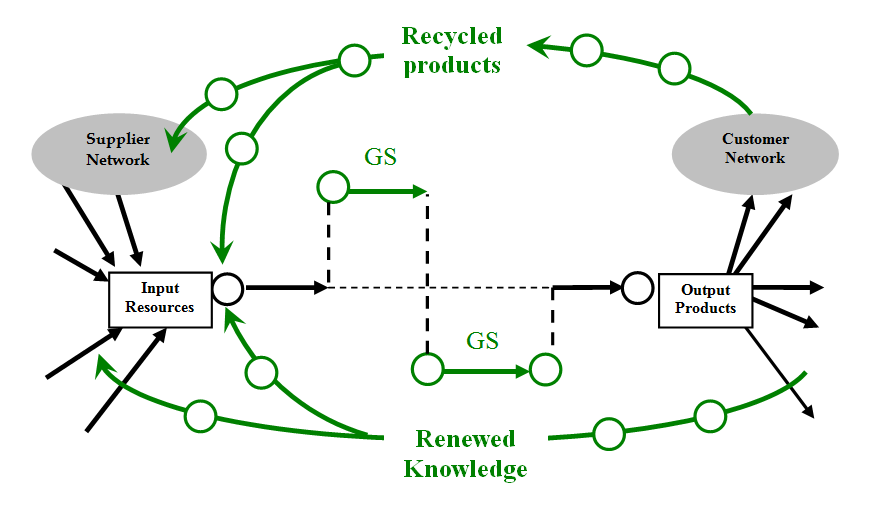
Figure 4: Recycled Process and Global Sourcing

During the process of utilizing added value, the asset-recovery practices expand quickly to a majority of products and services (Dell, IBM, Xerox). New products are being designed for extended life spans and multiple profit cycles. Reverse logistics and reverse logistics management (RLM) are adding new loops to the traditionally unidirectional processes of supply chains. Old supply chains have become demand chains and now reverse value chains, demonstrating that value can be added in both directions: through the forward pass of production as well as through the backward pass of recovery and remanufacture. Concepts of easy disassembly, durability, reuse and recycling are built in into equipment design.

Figure 4 refers to closed-loop management system and it represents the Stage 6 of the evolution of management systems. The new loops in the figure are not just traditional information feedback loops, but real business processes of collection, disassembly, reprocessing and reassembly activities (operations). The conventional open-ended linear processes are being redesigned towards closure.

New loops of recycled products and materials, energy recovery and knowledge renewal are being created within global-sourcing (GS) networks. Product reuse/remanufacture relies on a high residual value which gives a good head start for added value maximization. The system becomes organizationally closed and potentially long-term sustainable or even trans-generations self-sustainable. The "openness" and customization of the product design, upgradeable products, flexible product platforms, mutability and waste-free strategies are being implemented.

== Evolutionary spiral ==
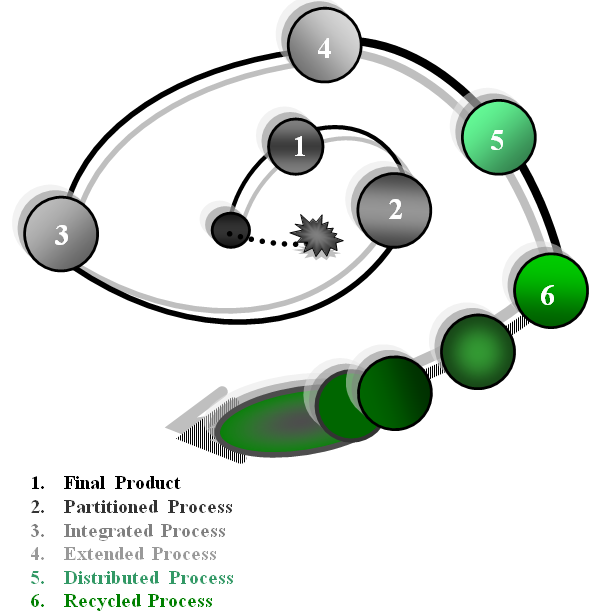
Figure 5: The evolutionary spiral of Six Management Systems (SMS)

Evolutionary spiral of the six management systems (SMS) are indicated in Figure 5.

It is appropriate to notice that six-management-system evolution is progressing in an accelerated fashion, the periods of stasis are getting shorter and revolutions are occurring faster. Individual management systems are beginning to overlap and their boundaries are getting blurred. An era of continuous change in business models and management systems emerges: the search for competitive advantage (one over the other) becomes relentless, strenuous and resources depleting. Cooperation networks have to merge into larger entities, reducing competition and expanding collaboration. The search for collaborative advantage (for both jointly) will become the new mode of economic behavior.
