= Bahrain Development Bank =

Bahrain Development Bank B.S.C.
- Company type: State owned
- Industry: Banking; Financial services
- Founded: 11 December 1991; 34 years ago
- Headquarters: Manama, Bahrain
- Area served: Bahrain
- Key people: Mohammed Bin essa al Khalifa (Chairman); Sanjeev Paul; Chief Executive Officer
- Products: Finance and insurance Consumer Banking; Corporate Banking; Investment Banking
- Revenue: ▼$27.59 million (2015)
- Net income: ▲$2.74 million (2015)
- Total assets: ▲514 million (2015)
- Total equity: ▲$204.3 million (2015)
- Number of employees: 203 (2015)
- Website: www.bdb-bh.com

The Bahrain Development Bank (BDB) (Arabic: بنك البحرين للتنمية) is a development finance institution established to by the Government of Bahrain to promote investments in the country. BDB is registered with the Ministry of Industry and Commerce and licensed by the Central Bank of Bahrain as a conventional retail bank.

== Overview ==
Bahrain Development Bank provides a variety of financial services that are tailored to meet the needs of small and medium businesses in Bahrain. These include business finance, Islamic financing and Tamkeen finance to manufacturing, agribusiness, healthcare and other services sectors.

BDB's headquarters are in Diplomatic Area, Manama, Bahrain. As of 31 December 2015, the total asset valuation of the bank was approximately US$514 Million (BHD:194 Million), with shareholder's equity of about US$204.77 million (BHD:77.19 million) and a branch network of six full-fledged branches and two satellite branches.

== History ==
The BDB was established by Legislative Decree number 19 on 11 December 1991 and commenced operations as a bank on 20 January 1992. Its main agenda was to promote investments in Bahrain especially in crucial industries. The initial paid in share capital was BD 10 million, of which BD 7.25 million was subscribed by Government agencies, with the balance coming from local commercial banks and the private sector. A commitment from Government to provide BD 4 Million by way of loan at 2% per annum for each of the first ten years was intended to eventually boost resources to BD 50 million. Mr. Isa A. Borshaid, at the time Undersecretary at the Ministry of Finance, was the founding chairman of the board, and Roger J Webster – formerly senior vice president, business development and project management of the GCC's Gulf Investment Corporation Kuwait – was appointed chief executive officer.

By 31 December 1993, 19 staff were in post and 49 projects with an expected total cost of BD 27.829 million had been approved for investment. The bank's contribution to this cost was BD 4.990 million (17.9%). Twenty-four of the approvals were start-ups with an expected project cost of BD 21.810 million, and some 36 of these approvals – mainly smaller projects to which the bank's contribution was in the region of 32% – had received full disbursement or were at the final legal documents stage. As the bank was still absorbing start-up costs it was not yet profitable, reporting a cumulative loss at the year end of BD 45,274 after charging interest on the government loan of BD 181,404. The bank's 1993 annual report contains much information on its organisation and operations.

In May 1994, the bank became the first Gulf financial institution to qualify as a European Community Investment Partner (ECIP), giving the Bahraini private sector the opportunity to access funding and support from Brussels and European industry, and a wide network of contacts.

By October 1994 Khalid S.S. Shaheen had taken over from Roger Webster, whilst earlier in the year Shaikh Ebrahim Bin Khalifa Al Khalifa had become the bank's chairman, having replaced Isa Borshaid as Undersecretary at the Ministry of Finance.

In 2014, BDB signed an agreement with Small Industries Development Bank of India to promote start-ups. In this agreement, SIDBI committed to providing technical assistance to BDB in risk management and credit management to further BDB's missions.

In 2014, BDB launched the Imagine Cup Competition in collaboration with Microsoft to support entrepreneurs and creators to establish solutions geared to resolve some of the world's toughest challenges.

In 2015, Moody's assigned a Baa2/Prime-2/Negative rating to BDB due to the bank's high-risk loan portfolio and reliance on public funding.

== Member companies ==
Other than its development banking core business, BDB also has subsidiaries and investments that are geared towards achieving its objectives. The companies that comprise the Bahrain Development Bank subsidiaries and investments include, but are not limited, to the following:

- Bahrain Business Incubator Centre – 100 percent shareholding – Development and assistance to emerging entrepreneurs.
- BDB SME Fund Company – 99 percent shareholding – Managing SME funds
- Middle East Corner Consultancy – 28.6 percent shareholding – Consultancy to small and medium enterprises
- Arabian Taxi Company – 20 percent shareholding – Operating and managing taxi services.
- EBDA Bank – 20 percent shareholding – Providing microfinance and related advisory services.

All these subsidiaries and investments are held in Bahrain.

== Ownership ==
The shares of the stock of Bahrain Development Bank are all held by the Government of Bahrain. This makes BDB a government parastatal.

== Governance ==
Bahrain Development Bank is governed by an eight-person board of directors, with Ghassan Ghaleb Abdulaal serving as the chairman of the group and Dalal AlQais as the CEO.

== See also ==
- List of banks in Bahrain
- List of national development banks
