= Abu Sudayrah =

- Location in Qatar
- Coordinates: 25°16′53″N 51°30′45″E
- Country: Qatar
- Municipality: Doha

Abu Sudayrah is a settlement in Qatar, located in the municipality of Doha. It is located 3 miles from Doha International Airport.

Nearby towns and villages include As Sadd (0.5 nm), Al Bida` al Gharbiyah (0.8 nm), `Abd al `Aziz (0.7 nm). Al Jabar (0.7 nm) and Al Muntazah (0.9 nm).
