= BDB =

BDB may refer to:

== Companies, groups, organizations ==
- Benghazi Defense Brigades of the Shura Council of Benghazi Revolutionaries, of Libya
- Bharat Diamond Bourse, Mumbai, India; the world's largest diamond bourse
- Bikalpa Dhara Bangladesh, a Bangladeshi political party

=== Banking ===
- Bahrain Development Bank, Bahrain
- Banc De Binary (BdB), an Israeli financial firm with a history of regulatory issues on three continents
- Association of German Banks (BdB; German: Bundesverband deutscher Banken), Germany; in the private sector
- Bulgarian Development Bank, Bulgaria

== Places ==
- Bundaberg Airport (IATA airport code "BDB"), Bundaberg, Queensland, Australia
- Chittagong Division (ISO 3155 region code "BD-B"), Bangladesh

== Publications, media, arts, entertainment ==
- "B D B", the seventh song on Duke Ellington and Count Basie 1961 album First Time! The Count Meets the Duke
- Brown–Driver–Briggs, a standard reference for Biblical Hebrew and Aramaic

== Science, engineering, technology ==
- 1,3-Benzodioxolylbutanamine (also 'BDB'), an entactogenic drug of the phenethylamine chemical class
- Berkeley DB, a discontinued embedded database software library for key/value data
- Big dumb booster, a general class of rocket

== Other uses ==
- Basap language (ISO 639 language code "bdb"), an Austronesian language spoken in Borneo
- Dan Burn (born 1992, "Big Dan Burn"), a player for Newcastle United, a defender.
