= OHSAS 18001 =

International standard for occupational health and safety management systems

Occupational Health and Safety Assessment Series 18001 (OHSAS 18001) was an international standard for occupational health and safety management systems. It was developed in March 1999 by Occupational Health and Safety Assessment Series Project Group, by a national standards bodies, academic bodies, accreditation bodies, certification bodies and occupational health and safety institutions, with the UK’s national standards body, BSI, providing the secretariat. The goal of the standard is the reduction of occupational injuries and diseases, including promoting and protecting physical and mental health. The standard was designed to fit into an integrated management system. ISO 45001 was published in March 2018 by International Organization for Standardization. The Occupational Health and Safety Assessment Series Project Group adopted the ISO 45001. Organizations that are certified to OHSAS 18001 were able to migrate to integrated management system or ISO 45001 by March 2021 to retain a valid certification.

== History ==
In March 1993, BSI published the world's first occupational health and safety management systems standard, BS 8750, and in March 1996, BS 8800, as part of a response to growing concerns about the occupational health and safety. Before 1999 there was an increase of national and proprietary standards and schemes to choose from. This caused confusion and fragmentation in the market and undermined the credibility of individual standards and schemes. Organizations worldwide recognized the need to control and improve health and safety performance and were doing so with occupational health and safety management systems (OHSMS), but they needed a unified standard. Recognising this deficit, an international collaboration called the Occupational Health and Safety Assessment Series Project Group was formed to create a single unified approach.

== Development ==
The Occupational Health and Safety Assessment Series Project Group comprised representatives from national standards bodies, academic bodies, accreditation bodies, certification bodies and occupational health and safety institutions, with the UK’s national standards body, BSI, providing the secretariat. Drawing on the best of existing standards and schemes, the Occupational Health and Safety Assessment Series Project Group published the world's first international occupational health and safety management systems standard, OHSAS 18000 series in March 1999. The series consisted of two specifications: OHSAS 18001 provided requirements for an OHS management system and OHSAS 18002 gave implementation guidelines.

OHSAS 18000 series was updated in July 2007, based on conventions and guidelines of the ILO, and national standards.

Since the publication of the ISO 45000 series in March 2018, by ISO, the Occupational Health and Safety Assessment Series Project Group adopted the ISO 45000 series.

== Certification ==
OHSAS 18001 certification has criteria that require that organizations seeking to gain and maintain certification must go beyond simple compliance to the standard. Prospective organizations must integrate it into their management practices and demonstrate ongoing compliance with the standard. OHSAS 18001 is based on the principles of the best of existing standards and schemes from around the world.

== See also ==
- Safety management system
