= Rasheed Mohammed Al Maraj =

Bahraini banker and politician

Rasheed Mohammed Al Maraj is a Bahraini economist and banker, who was the governor of Central Bank of Bahrain from January 2005 to February 2024.

Al Maraj was born in 1955. He has a Bachelor of Science degree in engineering from the University of Houston in 1979, and has additional courses in project evaluation and investment and capital management.

Before he started working at the central bank, he worked in several ministries; the Ministry of Industry and Development 1979–80, the Ministry of Finance and National Economy 1981-1995 and the Ministry of Transportation 1995–1999. From April 1999 to 2005, he was chief executive of the Arab Petroleum Investments Corporation (APICORP) in Dammam, Saudi Arabia.
