= Citibank Bahrain =

American multinational investment bank and financial services corporation

Citibank N.A., Kingdom of Bahrain
- Company type: Subsidiary
- Industry: Banking; Financial services
- Founded: 1969; 57 years ago
- Area served: Kingdom of Bahrain
- Key people: Michel Sawaya (CEO for Bahrain)
- Website: www.citi.com/icg/sa/emea/bahrain/corporate/

Citibank N.A., Kingdom of Bahrain (Arabic: سيتي بنك), commonly known as Citibank Bahrain, is the division of Citigroup that operates in Bahrain. Its operations include corporate banking as well as a call center that services 200,000 clients worldwide.

== History ==
Initially providing commercial banking, the consumer banking arm of Citi Bahrain was launched in 1989.

In 1996, Citi Bahrain became the first international institution to set up a separately capitalized Islamic bank.

In December 2022, the consumer business in Bahrain was sold to Ahli United Bank.

== See also ==
- List of banks in Bahrain
