= Banagas =

Bahraini gas company

Bahrain National Gas Company
- Type: State-owned enterprise
- Industry: LPG, naphtha
- Founded: 1979
- Headquarters: Southern Governorate, Bahrain
- Key people: CEO:Dr. Mohammed bin Khalifa Al Khalifa - Chairman:Mr. Mark Thomas - Vice Chairman: Mohammed bin Abdulrahman Al Khalifa
- Products: propane, butane, naphtha
- Revenue: $282 million (2014)
- Number of employees: 500 (2010)
- Website: www.banagas.com.bh

Banagas (formally the Bahrain National Gas Company) is a Bahraini gas company, headquartered in Bahrain's Southern Governorate. Banagas operates LPG plant facilities which recover propane, butane and naphtha from the Bahrain Oil Field's associated gas and refinery off-gas. Some 94% of the total workforce are Bahrain nationals. 75% of the company's shares are owned by the Government of Bahrain, with the remaining shares owned by Boubyan Petrochemical Company of Kuwait and Chevron Corporation's Bahrain subsidiary, Chevron Bahrain.

== History ==
The company was founded in 1979 by Shaikh Isa bin Salman Al Khalifa with the objective of utilizing Bahrain's gas resources, by processing associated gas and refinery off-gas into marketable products. The entire US$100 million project included the construction of four gas compressor stations, a processing plant to recover propane, butane and naphtha, and a storage area at Sitra. In 1980 the first ship to transport gas was the Japanese tanker Yuyo Maru which was loaded with 5,000 tonnes of butane. In 1988 the total capacity of the plant was upgraded from 170 (48.1×105m³) million cubic feet/day to 280 million cubic feet/day (79.3×105m³).

== Operations ==
Banagas compresses associated gas and refinery off-gas at its compressor stations before being sent to its central gas plant. After processing the treated products are routed to tanks and analyzed then pumped via a pipeline to refrigerated storage tanks at Sitra. Currently, the company has the capacity to produce 3000 bbls of propane, 3200 bbls of butane and 4500 bbls of naphtha per day. In addition to exporting its products, Banagas uses residue gas as fuel for its own furnaces and gas turbines, while the rest is supplied to Aluminium Bahrain, Riffa Power Station, and the Bapco Refinery.

== See also ==
- List of companies of Bahrain
