= ABC Islamic Bank =

Bahraini company

ABC Islamic Bank (E.C)
- Type: Private
- Industry: Banking
- Founded: 1998
- Headquarters: ABC Tower, Bahrain
- Key people: Amr ElNokaly (Chairman)
- Products: Islamic Commercial Banking Services; Islamic Treasury Services; Islamic Investment and Asset Management Services; Islamic Investment Banking and Other Specialist Products
- Website: Official website

ABC Islamic Bank is a Joint Stock Company that provides investment banking services and asset management services in accordance with Islamic principles. It is a wholly owned subsidiary of Bank ABC. Its subsidiaries include ABC Clearing Company and ABC Islamic Fund.

It is formerly known as ABC Investment and Services Company until March 1998, established in 1987.

== History ==
In 2013, ABC Islamic Bank acted as a mandated lead arranger when Al Baraka Turk, the Turkish subsidiary of Bahrain-based Al Baraka Bank, announced the initiation of a $250 million syndicated loan. This sharia-compliant facility is structured in two parts and will be utilized for the bank's financing activities.

In 2014, ABC Islamic Bank served as a lead arranger when Kuwait Finance House announced the successful securing of a syndicated Islamic loan worth $350 million by its Turkish subsidiary, Kuveyt Turk. This loan represented the largest of its kind in Kuwait at the time. The loan was structured as a dual-currency transaction with two tranches, and it utilized the common cost-plus sale arrangement known as murabaha in Islamic finance.

In 2019, ABC Islamic Bank participated in a refinancing facility worth $1.3 billion for the Al Dur Power & Water Company based in Bahrain. The facility was provided by a syndicate of 20 banks and comprised $450 million of conventional facilities and $850 million of Islamic facilities. Al Dur holds a significant position in Bahrain's power and water production, contributing to one-third of the country's total output. With a combined capacity of 1,234 MW of power and 48 MIGD of water, it plays a crucial role in meeting the nation's demand.

In 2022, Bahrain’s nine banks offering Islamic banking services recorded a 3.5% rise in sharia-compliant assets for 2020, with just, ABC Islamic Bank and Al Salam Bank, recording a growth of more than 10% for the year.

In 2022, ABC Islamic Bank sponsored the 11th Edition of the Annual Sukuk Report by The International Islamic Financial Market. This research report offered an overview of global Sukuk issuances, including details on issuers, Sukuk structures, case studies on notable issuances, articles on Sukuk market developments and prospects, and country-focused reports on IIFM founding member countries and major Sukuk issuing jurisdictions.

== See also ==
- List of banks
- List of banks in Bahrain
