= Khaleeji Commercial Bank =

Bank of Bahrain

Khaleeji Bank B.S.C.
- Formerly: Khaleeji Commercial Bank B.S.C.
- Company type: Public
- Industry: Banking
- Founded: November 24, 2004; 21 years ago in Manama, Bahrain
- Headquarters: Manama, Bahrain
- Area served: Bahrain
- Key people: Hisham Ahmed Al Rayes (chairman); Sattam Sulaiman Algosaibi (CEO)
- Products: Islamic banking products
- Services: Retail banking Corporate banking Consumer finance Wealth management
- Parent: GFH Financial Group
- Website: khaleeji.bank

Khaleeji Bank B.S.C. (formerly Khaleeji Commercial Bank B.S.C.) is a Bahraini public shareholding Islamic bank that provides retail and corporate banking, consumer finance, wealth management, structured investment products, and project financing facilities in accordance with Islamic Shari'a principles. It operates under an Islamic retail banking license granted by the Central Bank of Bahrain and is headquartered in Manama, Bahrain.

== History ==
Khaleeji Bank was incorporated on 24 November 2004 in the Kingdom of Bahrain under Commercial Registration No. 55133. In June 2023, the bank changed its commercial name from Khaleeji Commercial Bank B.S.C. to Khaleeji Bank B.S.C..

== See also ==
- List of banks in Bahrain
