= List of banks in Bahrain =

The following is a list of banks and financial institutions in Bahrain as of 30 June 2015:

== Central Bank ==
- Central Bank of Bahrain

== Conventional banks ==
Full name	Call name	Established	R	W	Majority owner	Capital	Website
Ahli United Bank B.S.C	Ahli United Bank	12 July 2000	Yes	No	Public	(Bahrain)	ahliunited.com/bh
Arab Bank plc., Bahrain	Arab Bank	5 December 1960	Yes	Yes	Arab Bank	(Jordan)	arabbank.bh
Bank ABC	ila (Retail); Bank ABC (Wholesale)	25 December 1979	Yes	Yes	Central Bank of Libya	(Libya)	ilabank.com bank-abc.com
Allied Bank Limited, Wholesale Branch	Allied Bank	21 March 2011	No	Yes	Allied Bank Limited	(Pakistan)	abl.com
Alubaf Arab International Bank (Bahrain) B.S.C. (c)	Alubaf	19 January 1982	No	Yes	Libyan Foreign Bank	(Libya)	alubafbank.com
The Arab Investment Company S.A.A.	TAIC	2 September 1982	No	Yes	Arab League	(Arab League)	taic.com
Arab Petroleum Investment Corporation	APICORP	17 September 2005	No	Yes	OAPEC	(Arab League)	apicorp.org
Askari Wholesale Bank, Bahrain	Askari Bank	18 November 2002	No	Yes	Fauji Foundation	(Pakistan)	askaribank.com
BNP Paribas CRB Bahrain	BNP Paribas	18 February 1975	Yes	Yes	BNP Paribas	(France)	mea.bnpparibas.com
Bahrain Development Bank B.S.C.	BDB	22 January 1992	Yes	No	Government	(Bahrain)	bdb-bh.com
Bank of Bahrain and Kuwait B.S.C.	BBK	16 March 1971	Yes	No	Ithmaar Bank	(Bahrain)	bbkonline.com
Bahrain Middle East Bank B.S.C.	BMB	3 December 1980	No	Yes	AN Investment	(Bahrain)	bmb.com.bh
Bank Al Habib Wholesale Branch, Manama	Bank Al Habib	17 September 2005	No	Yes	Dawood Habib	(Pakistan)	bankalhabib.com
Bank Alfalah Bahrain	Bank Alfalah	8 April 2006	No	Yes	Bank Alfalah Limited	(Pakistan)	bankalfalah.com/bh
Bank of Jordan, Bahrain	Bank of Jordan	2 January 2018	No	Yes	Bank of Jordan	(Jordan)	bankofjordan.com
Citibank N.A., Kingdom of Bahrain	Citibank Bahrain	2 December 1969	Yes	Yes	Citibank, N.A.	(United States)	citibank.com.bh
Credit Libanais SAL, Bahrain	Credit Libanais	17 January 2007	Yes	No	Credit Libanais SAL	(Lebanon)	creditlibanais.com.lb
Cairo Amman Bank Bahrain	CAB	22 July 2014	No	Yes	Cairo Amman Bank	(Jordan)	cab.jo
Citicorp Banking Corporation	Citicorp	8 February 1983	No	Yes	Citigroup	(United States)	
DenizBank A.Ş., Bahrain	DenizBank	20 July 2002	No	Yes	DenizBank A.Ş.	(Turkey)	denizbank.com
Eskan Bank B.S.C. (c)	Eskan Bank	10 March 1979	Yes	No	Government	(Bahrain)	eskanbank.com
QNB Finansbank A.Ş., Bahrain	QNB Finansbank	5 June 1999	No	Yes	QNB Finansbank A.Ş.	(Turkey)	qnbfinansbank.com
First Abu Dhabi Bank - Bahrain Branch	FAB	19 May 2001	Yes	No	FAB PJSC	(United Arab Emirates)	bankfab.com/en-bh
Gulf International Bank B.S.C	GIB	14 March 1977	Yes	Yes	Public Investment Fund	(Saudi Arabia)	gib.com
Habib Bank Limited - HBL Bahrain	HBL	17 November 1968	Yes	Yes	Habib Bank Limited	(Pakistan)	globalhbl.com/bahrain
HSBC Bank Middle East Limited - Bahrain	HSBC	16 December 1944	Yes	Yes	HSBC Bank Middle East	(United Arab Emirates)	hsbc.com.bh
HDFC Bank Limited - Bahrain	HDFC Bank	7 October 2007	No	Yes	HDFC Bank Limited	(India)	hdfcbankbahrain.com
ICICI Bank, Bahrain Branch	ICICI Bank	6 January 2004	Yes	No	ICICI Bank Limited	(India)	icicibank.bh
JPMorgan Chase Bank N.A., Bahrain	JPMorgan	26 November 1976	No	Yes	JPMorgan Chase & Co.	(United States)	jpmorgan.com/bh
JS Bank, Bahrain Branch	JS Bank	30 June 2005	No	Yes	JS Bank Limited	(Pakistan)	jsbl.com
KEB Hana Bank, Bahrain Branch	KEB Hana Bank	23 February 1977	No	Yes	KEB Hana Bank	(South Korea)	global.1qbank.com
MCB Wholesale Bank (Branch) Manama - Bahrain	MCB	22 August 1995	No	Yes	MCB Bank Limited	(Pakistan)	mcb.com.pk
MUFG Bank, Bahrain Branch	MUFG	24 October 1979	No	Yes	MUFG Bank, Ltd.	(Japan)	bk.mufg.jp
Mashreqbank P.S.C., Bahrain	Mashreq	2 August 2017	Yes	Yes	Mashreqbank P.S.C.	(United Arab Emirates)	mashreqbank.com
National Bank of Bahrain BSC	NBB	1 January 1957	Yes	No	Mumtalakat	(Bahrain)	nbbonline.com
National Bank of Kuwait S.A.K.P, Bahrain	NBK	22 March 1977	Yes	No	NBK S.A.K.P	(Kuwait)	nbk.com/bahrain
National Bank of Pakistan, Bahrain	NBP	26 January 1978	No	Yes	National Bank of Pakistan	(Pakistan)	nbp.com.pk
Palestine Investment Bank, Bahrain	PIB	25 August 2016	No	Yes	PIB Palestine	(Palestine)	pibbahrain.com
Rafidain Bank Bahrain	Rafidain Bank	1 July 1969	Yes	No	Rafidain Bank	(Iraq)	rafidainbankbh.com
SICO Bank	SICO	3 December 1996	No	Yes	SIO Services	(Bahrain)	sicobank.com
The Saudi National Bank, Bahrain	SNB	4 November 1978	No	Yes	Saudi National Bank	(Saudi Arabia)	alahli.com
Standard Chartered Bank (Bahrain) Limited	StanChart	11 August 1918	Yes	Yes	Standard Chartered plc	(United Kingdom)	sc.com/bh
State Bank of India, Branch, Bahrain	SBI	17 September 2005	Yes	Yes	State Bank of India	(India)	bh.statebank
The Housing Bank - Bahrain	HBTF	11 June 2002	Yes	No	HBTF Jordan	(Jordan)	hbtf.bh
Ziraat Bank, Bahrain Branch	Ziraat Bank	26 July 2016	No	Yes	T.C. Ziraat Bankası A.Ş.	(Turkey)	ziraatbankbahrain.com
Halkbank, Bahrain Branch	Halkbank	24 November 2004	No	Yes	Türkiye Halk Bankası A.Ş.	(Turkey)	halkbank.com.tr
İşbank, Bahrain Branch	İşbank	14 October 2000	No	Yes	Türkiye İş Bankası A.Ş.	(Turkey)	isbahrain.com.bh
United Bank Limited, Bahrain	UBL	22 March 1969	Yes	No	United Bank Limited	(Pakistan)	ubldigital.com/Bahrain
UBS AG Manama Representative Office	UBS	17 February 1993	No	Yes	UBS Asset Management	(United Kingdom)	ubs.com/bh
United Gulf Bank B.S.C. (c)	UGB	29 May 1988	No	Yes	United Gulf Holding Co.	(Bahrain)	ugbbh.com
Vakifbank Bahrain Branch	VakıfBank	3 May 2005	No	Yes	Türkiye Vakıflar Bankası	(Turkey)	vakifbank.com.tr
Woori Bank Bahrain	Woori Bank	30 June 1983	No	Yes	Woori Bank	(South Korea)	wooribank.com/bh
Yapı Kredi - Bahrain Branch	Yapı Kredi	19 January 1982	No	Yes	Yapı ve Kredi Bankası	(Turkey)	yapikredi.com.tr

== Islamic banks ==
Full name	Call name	Established	R	W	Majority owner	Capital	Website
ABC Islamic Bank (E.C.)	ABC Islamic Bank	29 July 1985	No	Yes	Bank ABC	(Bahrain)	bank-abc.com/islamicbank
Al Baraka Islamic Bank B.S.C. (c)	alBaraka	30 September 1983	Yes	No	Al Baraka Group	(Bahrain)	albaraka.bh
Al Baraka Banking Group B.S.C. (c)	alBaraka (Wholesale)	6 January 1998	No	Yes	Dallah Al-Baraka	(Bahrain)	albaraka.com
Iraic Bank D.C (c)	Iraic Bank	6 December 1992	No	Yes	Private	(Bahrain)	bankalkhair.com
Al Salam Bank B.S.C.	Al Salam Bank	3 May 2005	Yes	No	Bank Muscat	(Oman)	alsalambank.com
Bahrain Islamic Bank B.S.C.	BisB	29 October 1978	Yes	No	NBB	(Bahrain)	bisb.com
BOK International, Bahrain	BOK International	9 November 2015	No	Yes	Bank of Khartoum	(Sudan)	bokintl.com
Bank Al-Khair B.S.C (c)	Bank Alkhair	6 January 2004	No	Yes	Private	(Bahrain)	bankalkhair.com
Manama Bank D.C (c)	ManamaBank	21 August 2012	No	Yes	Private	(Bahrain)	manamabank.com
Citi Islamic Investment Bank E.C.	CIIB	17 March 1996	No	Yes	Citicorp	(United States)	citi.com/icg/bahrain
GFH Financial Group B.S.C.	gfh	2 August 1999	No	Yes	Public	(Bahrain)	gfh.com
Ithmaar Bank B.S.C. ( c )	Ithmaar Bank	17 March 1996	Yes	No	Private	(Bahrain)	ithmaarbank.com
Khaleeji Commercial Bank B.S.C.	KHCB	20 October 2003	Yes	No	GFH Group	(Bahrain)	khcbonline.com
Kuwait Finance House Bahrain B.S.C. (c)	KFH Bahrain	9 December 2001	Yes	No	Kuwait Finance House	(Kuwait)	kfh.bh
Kuwait Turkish Participation Bank Inc., Bahrain	Kuveyt Türk Bahrain	3 February 2002	No	Yes	Kuveyt Türk A.S.	(Turkey)	kuveytturk.com.tr
Liquidity Management Centre B.S.C. (c)	LMC	11 June 2002	No	Yes	Private	(Bahrain)	lmcbahrain.com
RA Bahrain B.S.C. (c)	RA Bahrain	20 August 1996	No	Yes	Arcapita	(Bahrain)	
Venture Capital Bank B.S.C (c)	VC Bank	3 May 2005	No	Yes	Private	(Bahrain)	vc-bank.com

== See also ==
- List of banks in the Arab world
