= Tʼazur Company =

Bahraini takaful insurance company

- Native name: شركة تآزر
- Type: Private
- Industry: Insurance
- Founded: 2007; 19 years ago in Manama, Bahrain
- Fate: Bahrain operations and Qatar branch merged into Solidarity Bahrain in 2022
- Successor: Solidarity Bahrain
- Headquarters: Manama, Bahrain
- Area served: Bahrain, Kuwait, and Qatar
- Products: Family and general takaful products
- Services: Takaful insurance Health insurance Motor insurance Marine insurance
- Website: tazur.com.kw

Tʼazur Company was a Bahraini takaful insurance company that provided family and general Islamic insurance products for individuals and businesses. The company was incorporated in Manama, Bahrain, as a closed joint-stock company and was licensed and regulated by the Central Bank of Bahrain. In 2022, its Bahrain operations and Qatar branch were merged into Solidarity Bahrain.

== History ==
Tʼazur was founded in 2007 by Unicorn Investment Bank after receiving a takaful licence from the Central Bank of Bahrain. At launch, the company had an authorised capital of US$500 million, of which US$58 million was issued and paid up, and its founding investors came from Bahrain, Kuwait, Qatar, and Saudi Arabia.

In July 2009, Tʼazur announced the launch of its family and general takaful product range in Bahrain. In September 2009, it was authorised by the Qatar Financial Centre Regulatory Authority to operate a general takaful business in the Qatar Financial Centre, becoming the first Islamic general insurance company licensed there.

In August 2021, Solidarity Bahrain announced an intention to acquire T'azur's Bahrain operations, including its Qatar branch in run-off, in exchange for newly issued shares in Solidarity Bahrain; the transaction excluded Tʼazur's 70% ownership of Tʼazur Takaful Insurance Company K.S.C. in Kuwait. The merger became effective on 27 January 2022.
