= Bank ABC =

Bahraini bank

- Headquarters in Manama
- Company type: Shareholding Company
- Traded as: BHSE:ABC; XAMM:ABCO
- ISIN: BH0008794115; JO1100911014
- Industry: Banking
- Founded: January 17, 1980; 46 years ago
- Headquarters: Manama, Bahrain
- Number of locations: 110 (2025)
- Area served: Algeria, Bahrain, Egypt, Jordan and Tunisia
- Key people: Naji Belgasem (Chairman); Brendon Hopkins (GCEO)
- Products: International wholesale Universal banking Corporate finance Islamic banking Treasury
- Brands: ABC Islamic Bank
- Revenue: ▲US$ 1410 million (2025)
- Net income: ▲US$ 257 million (2025)
- Total assets: ▲US$ 49.9 billion (2025)
- Number of employees: 5000+ (2025)
- Website: www.bank-abc.com

Bank ABC (formerly Arab Banking Corporation), is an international bank with headquarters in the Diplomatic Area of Manama, Bahrain. It was incorporated as a joint stock company in 1980 through a special decree by the Amir of Bahrain. It obtained an offshore banking unit licence from the Bahrain Monetary Agency on 7 April 1980, and began operations in the same month. The bank is listed on the Bahrain Bourse and its major shareholders are the Central Bank of Libya (59.37%) and Kuwait Investment Authority (40.63%). Its network spreads across 17 countries.

== History ==
By April 1981, US$750 million had been fully paid by Bank ABC's original three shareholders: the Ministry of Finance of Kuwait (whose shares have since been transferred to the Kuwait Investment Authority), the Libyan Secretariat of Treasury (whose shares were later transferred to the Central Bank of Libya) and the Abu Dhabi Investment Authority. At the end of 1989, ABC's authorised share capital was increased to US$1.50 billion and in June 1990, paid-up capital was raised to US$1.00 billion through an international share offering. In June 2006, ABC's shares were split 10 for 1 in order to boost trading activities by placing them in the same range as other shares quoted on the Bahrain Bourse.

At an Extraordinary General Meeting held in April 2008, ABC's shareholders approved an increase in the authorized capital of the bank from US$1.5 billion to US$2.5 billion and an increase in issued and paid up capital from US$1.0 billion to US$2.0 billion by way of a priority rights share offering to existing shareholders. Another Extraordinary General Meeting was held on January 28, 2010, to approve an increase in the authorized capital from US$2.5 billion to US$3.5 billion and an increase in issued and paid up capital from US$2.0 billion to US$3.11 billion by way of a priority rights share offering to existing shareholders.

In December 2010, the Central Bank of Libya acquired the 17.72% shareholding of Abu Dhabi Investment Authority in ABC, increasing its stake to 59.37%.

In June 2015, Arab Banking Corporation revamped its corporate identity and changed its brand name to Bank ABC. The bank's new identity launch coincides with the commemoration of its 35th anniversary. The change to a single, unifying global brand name and corporate identity took effect on 15 June 2015 across the Bank's global network (with the exception of its subsidiary in Brazil, which will keep its own identity as Banco ABC Brasil). The legal names of the Arab Banking Corporation and its subsidiaries did not change.

In March 2022, during the EGM, Bank ABC obtained the shareholders' approval for an issuance of US$390 million in AT1 securities, which will increase the Bank's Tier 1 capital ratio by approximately 130 basis points, taking it back above 17%. Additionally, the Bank obtained the shareholders' approval to increase its authorized share capital from US$3.5 billion to US$4.5 billion.

== Shareholder ==
As of 2025 report:

| Shareholder | Percentage |
|---|---|
| Central Bank of Libya | 59,37% |
| Kuwait Investment Authority | 29,69% |
| Free Float | 10,94% |

== International Operations ==
- Algeria: It's a medium-sized bank, It has 24 branches. Bank ABC entered the Algerian financial sector in 1998.
- Egypt: It's a small-sized bank, In January 2021, Acquired all Lebanese BLOM Bank operations in Egypt.
- Jordan: It's a medium-sized bank, It has 19 branches. Bank ABC entered in the country in January 1990.
- Tunisia: It's a medium-sized bank, It has 17 branches. Bank ABC entered in the country in 1993.

== See also ==
- List of banks in Bahrain
