= Salman bin Khalifa Al Khalifa =

Politician in Bahrain

- سلمان بن خليفة آل خليفة
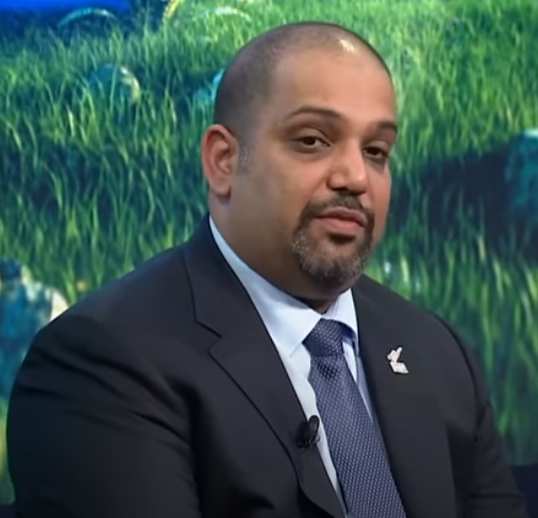
- Salman in 2022

Minister of Finance and National Economy
- Incumbent
- Assumed office December 2018
- Monarch: Hamad bin Isa Al Khalifa
- Preceded by: Ahmed bin Mohamed Al Khalifa

Sheikh Salman bin Khalifa Al Khalifa is a member of the Bahraini ruling family. He is the current Minister of Finance and National Economy.

Salman got a bachelor of science degree in 1999 in investments and economics from Babson College. He worked at UBS investment bank in United Kingdom from 2000 to 2005. Then he worked as managing director of global markets from 2008 to 2012 for the Middle East region at Deutsche Bank AG in Dubai. He was a director general in the office of the First Deputy Prime Minister since 2013.

In December 2018 Salman was appointed Minister of Finance and National Economy. He is also vice chairman of the board of the National Oil and Gas Authority.

== Honours ==
- Order of Bahrain (first class), 2016
