= Abdulla Hassan Saif =

Bahraini banker and politician

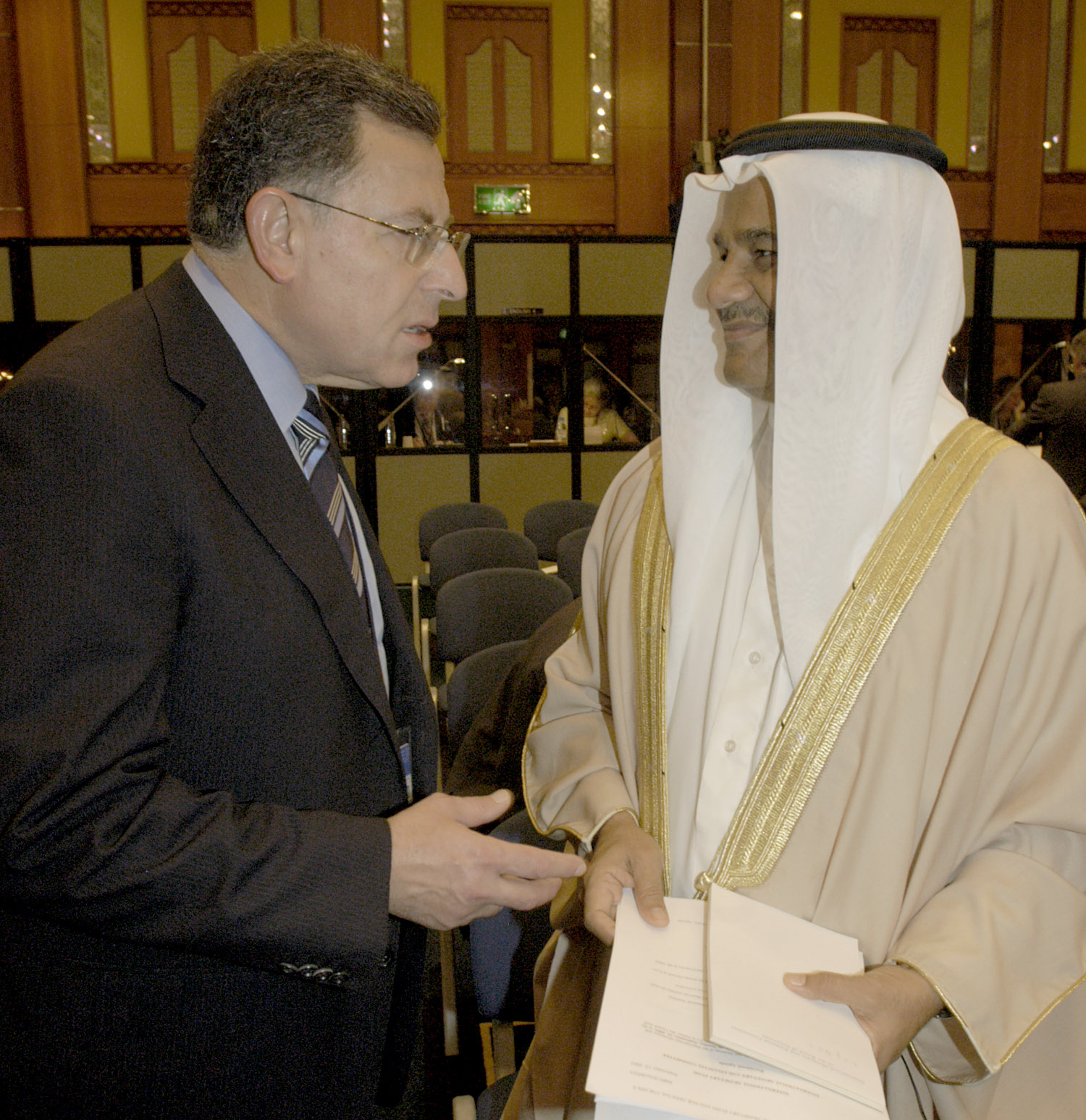
- Abdulla Hassan Saif (right) meeting with Lebanese Finance Minister Fuad Siniora in 2003

Minister of Finance and Economy of Bahrain
- In office May 1999 – January 2005
- Monarch: Hamad bin Isa Al Khalifa
- Preceded by: Ibrahim Abdul-Karim Mohamed
- Succeeded by: Ahmed bin Mohamed Al Khalifa

Abdulla Hassan Saif is a Bahraini banker and politician. He served as minister of finance of Bahrain from May 1999 to January 2005. Since leaving office, he has acted as vice chairman of The Islamic Bank of Asia.

Saif was the first Bahraini to lead Bahrain Monetary Authority, first as director-general from 1979 to 1981, and then as appointed governor from 1981 until his appointment as minister of finance in May 1999.
