= Ahli United Bank =

Defunct Bahraini bank

- Native name: البنك الأهلي المتحد
- Type: Private bank
- Traded as: BSE: AUB
- ISIN: BH0005508765
- Industry: Banking, Financial services
- Founded: May 31, 2000
- Defunct: 2024
- Fate: Acquired by Kuwait Finance House
- Headquarters: Manama, Bahrain
- Number of locations: 147 Branches
- Area served: Bahrain, Kuwait, Egypt, Iraq, Oman, Libya
- Key people: Meshal AbdulAziz Alothman (chairman); Hala Hatem Sadek (CEO)
- Products: Financial services
- Services: Banking
- Operating income: ▲USD 1,124.3 million (Q4 2018)
- Net income: ▲USD 940.5 million (Q4 2018)
- Total assets: ▲USD 35.5 billion (Q4 2018)
- Total equity: ▲USD 3.9 billion (Q4 2018)
- Number of employees: 3901
- Website: www.ahliunited.com

Ahli United Bank (Arabic: البنك الأهلي المتحد) was a regional bank based in Bahrain. Its head office was situated at Manama and is the largest bank in Bahrain. It is present in 8 countries in the Middle East and United Kingdom. Ahli United bank's ordinary shares are listed on Bahrain Stock Exchange since August 2000 and the Kuwait Stock Exchange since June 2006.

== History ==
Ahli United Bank established in May 2000 following a merger between The United Bank of Kuwait and Al-Ahli Commercial Bank, and it is licensed by the Central Bank of Bahrain under a retail banking license. Following the merger, both entities became fully owned subsidiaries of Ahli United Bank.

Kuwait Finance House initiated discussions about a possible merger with Ahli United Bank in July 2017. However, the deal encountered delays, with the Central Bank of Kuwait requesting a reassessment in March 2020 due to the COVID-19 pandemic.

In 2022, Kuwait Finance House's completed its acquisition of Ahli United Bank for $11.6 billion. The acquisition created a lender with approximately $121 billion in assets.

== Operations ==
The AUB (Ahli United Bank) Group provides retail banking, corporate banking, treasury and investment services, private banking and wealth management services and Islamic banking products and services. Additionally, the Group also provides life insurance products in both conventional and Takaful schemes.

In 2016, Ahli United Bank started its operations in the UAE through Ahli United Bank Limited (AUBL) in DIFC, Dubai, under a category 1 license.

In 2018, Ahli United Bank signed an agreement with Bahrain’s labor fund, Tamkeen, to provide a BHD 40 million portfolio for subsidized financing to eligible medium and large-sized enterprises in Bahrain.

== Major shareholders ==
- Public Institution For Social Security - Kuwait (18.67%)
- Social Insurance Organization - Bahrain (10.01%)
- Tamdeen Investment Co. - Kuwait (7.71%)

== Business divisions ==
The AUB Group operations consist of four core business divisions, all also offering Islamic finance products: Corporate Banking, Treasury and Investments, Retail Banking, Private Banking and Wealth Management.

== Islamic finance ==
Ahli United Bank provides Sharia-compliant banking services through the Islamic banking subsidiary, Ahli United Bank K.S.C.P., Ahli United Bank (UK) PLC. In April 2010, the Bank of Kuwait and the Middle East was converted to a fully Sharia-compliant Islamic banking institution, and its name was changed to Ahli United Bank K.S.C. After that, the Group launched Islamic banking services in the first quarter of 2013, through an associate in Oman, Ahli Bank S.A.O.G. The AUB Group launched its Islamic banking services formally under the name, Al-Hilal.

== Entities ==
- Ahli United Bank B.S.C
- Ahli United Bank B.S.C. (DIFC Branch)
- Ahli United Bank (UK) P.L.C
- Alhilal Islamic
- Ahli United Bank (Egypt) S.A.E
- Ahli United Bank K.S.C.P
- Ahli Bank S.O.A.G
- Commercial Bank of Iraq P.S.C
- United Bank for Commerce & Investment S.A.L.

== See also ==
- List of banks in Bahrain
