= ISO 45001 =

International standard for occupational health and safety management systems

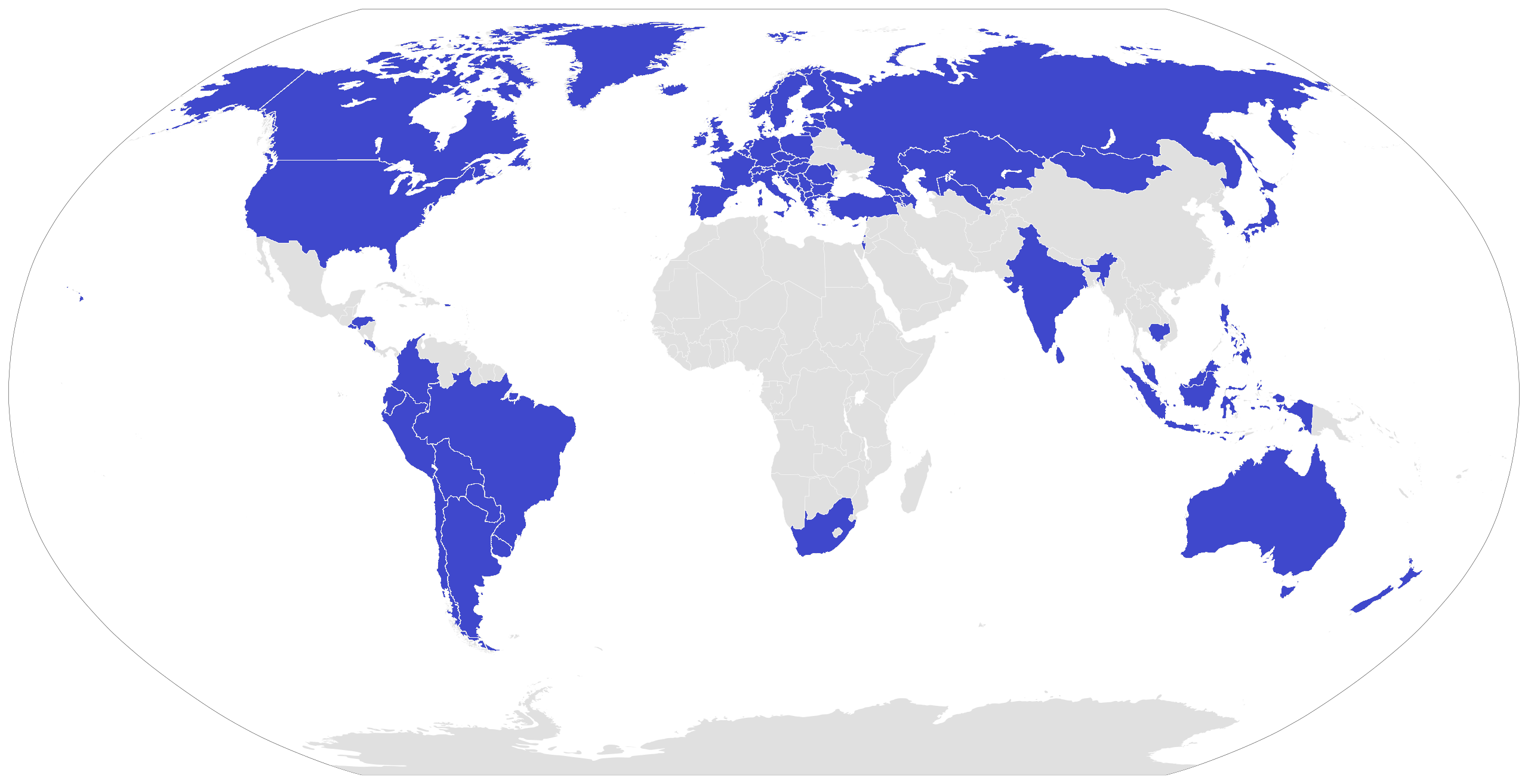
ISO 45001 adoption by country

ISO 45001 is an international standard for occupational health and safety management systems. It was developed in March 2018 by International Organization for Standardization. The goal of the standard is the reduction of occupational injuries and diseases, including promoting and protecting physical and mental health. The standard was designed to fit into an integrated management system.

The standard is based on OHSAS 18001, conventions and guidelines of the ILO, and national standards. It includes elements that are additional to OHSAS 18001 which it is replacing over a three-year migration period from 2018 to 2021. As of March 2021, organizations that are certified to OHSAS 18001 should have migrated to integrated management system or ISO 45001 to retain a valid certification, although ISO has extended the transition period for up to six months (to 11 September 2021) for organizations adversely affected by COVID-19.

ISO 45001 follows the High Level Structure of other ISO standards, such as ISO 9001:2015 and ISO 14001:2015, which makes integration of these standards easier.

== History ==
In March 1993, BSI published the world's first occupational health and safety management systems standard, BS 8750, and in March 1996, BS 8800, as part of a response to growing concerns about the occupational health and safety. Before 1999 there was an increase of national and proprietary standards and schemes to choose from. This caused confusion and fragmentation in the market and undermined the credibility of individual standards and schemes. Organizations worldwide recognized the need to control and improve health and safety performance and were doing so with occupational health and safety management systems (OHSMS), but they needed a unified standard. Recognising this deficit, an international collaboration called the Occupational Health and Safety Assessment Series Project Group was formed to create a single unified approach.

The Occupational Health and Safety Assessment Series Project Group comprised representatives from national standards bodies, academic bodies, accreditation bodies, certification bodies and occupational health and safety institutions, with the UK’s national standards body, BSI, providing the secretariat. Drawing on the best of existing standards and schemes, the Occupational Health and Safety Assessment Series Project Group published the world's first international occupational health and safety management systems standard, OHSAS 18000 series in March 1999. The series consisted of two specifications: OHSAS 18001 provided requirements for an OHS management system and OHSAS 18002 gave implementation guidelines.

OHSAS 18000 series was updated in July 2007, based on conventions and guidelines of the ILO, and national standards.

Since the publication of the ISO 45000 series in March 2018, by ISO, the Occupational Health and Safety Assessment Series Project Group adopted the ISO 45000 series.

== Development ==
ISO 45001 was proposed at the ISO in October 2013. The committee ISO/PC 283, created in 2013, had direct responsibility for the standardization process. At least 70 countries contributed to the drafting process. Preparation and committee work lasted until December 2015. From 2015 to 2017, a first draft failed to gain sufficient approval from ISO members and was revised in a second draft, which was approved and refined into a final draft. In the final vote, the standard garnered 62 votes in favour, nine abstentions and four votes against from France, India, Spain, and Turkey. The standard was published on 12 March 2018.

== Adoption ==
ISO 45001 was adopted as a National Standard by Albania, Argentina, Armenia, Austria, Australia, Azerbaijan, Belgium, Bolivia, Bosnia and Herzegovina, Brazil, Bulgaria, Cambodia, Canada, Chile, Colombia, Costa Rica, Croatia, Cyprus, the Czech Republic, Denmark, Ecuador, El Salvador, Estonia, Finland, France, Georgia, Germany, Greece, Honduras, Hungary, Iceland, India, Indonesia, Ireland, Israel, Italy, Japan, Kazakhstan, Latvia, Lithuania, Luxembourg, Malaysia, Mexico, Moldova, Mongolia, Montenegro, Netherlands, New Zealand, North Macedonia, Norway, Paraguay, Peru, Philippines, Poland, Portugal, Romania, Russia, Serbia, Singapore, Slovakia, Slovenia, South Africa, South Korea, Spain, Sri Lanka, Sweden, Switzerland, Taiwan, Turkey, United Kingdom, United States, Uruguay, and Uzbekistan.^{N-}^{[1]}

== ISO 45001 changes compared to OHSAS 18001 ==
- Context of the organization (Clause 4.1): The organization shall determine internal and external issues that are relevant to its purpose and that affect its ability to achieve the intended outcome(s) of its OHS management system.
- Understanding the needs and expectations of workers and other interested parties (clause 4.2): interested parties are workers, suppliers, subcontractors, clients, regulatory authorities.
- Risk and opportunities (Clauses: 6.1.1, 6.1.2.3, 6.1.4): companies are to determine, consider and, where necessary, take action to address any risks or opportunities that may impact (either positively or negatively) the ability of the management system to deliver its intended results, including enhanced health and safety at the workplace.
- Leadership and management commitment (Clauses: 5.1) has stronger emphasis on top management to actively engage and take accountability for the effectiveness of the management system.
- Planning: (clause 6)

== Certification ==
ISO 45001 is set to replace OHSAS 18001 over three years following its publication in March 2018. Occupational Health and Safety Assessment Series Project Group will formally withdraw OHSAS 18001 in September 2021, at the end of the extended migration period (due to COVID-19). ISO 45001 uses the management system standard structure guideline Annex SL to allow for simplified integration with other management system standards, such as ISO 9001 and ISO 14001. The International Accreditation Forum has published requirements for migration from OHSAS 18001 to ISO 45001.

Organizations with a pre-existing OHSAS 18001 certification that migrate to integrated management system or ISO 45001 can consider both certifications as one. For example, an OHSAS 18001 certification from 2017 that is migrated to ISO 45001 in 2020 will be considered as having run from 2017.

ISO/IEC TS 17021-10:2018 is a technical specification setting out competence requirements for auditing and certification of ISO 45001.

== See also ==
- Safety management system

== Notes ==
n-[1] ^{a}
