= List of supermarket chains in Bahrain =

This is a list of supermarket chains in Bahrain.

Al Awafi Supermarkets, Midway, HyperMax, Lulu Hypermarket, Bahrain Pride and Mega Mart are a few of the largest supermarket chains currently operating in the country.

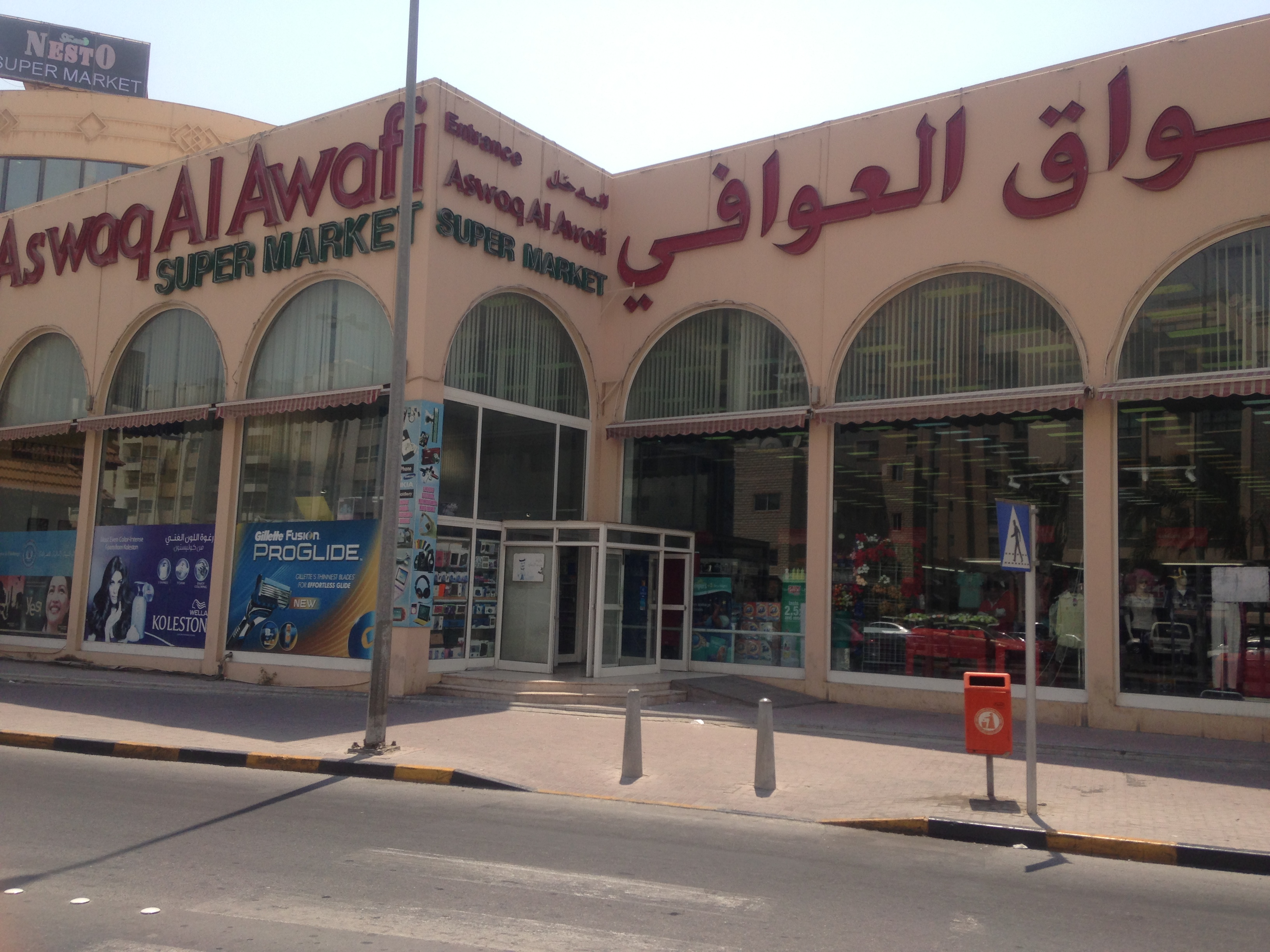
Aswag Al Awaf in Hoora

== Current supermarket chains ==
- Al Awafi Supermarkets
- MegaMart Supermarket
- Bahrain Pride
- Almuntazah Supermarket
- Al Jazira Supermarket
- Alosra Supermarket
- HyperMax
- Jawad Supermarket
- Le Marché Hypermarket
- LuLu Hypermarket
- Midway Supermarket
- MasterPoint Supermarket
- Nesto Hypermarket
- AlHelli Supermarket
- Al Adil Supermarket
