= BMMI =

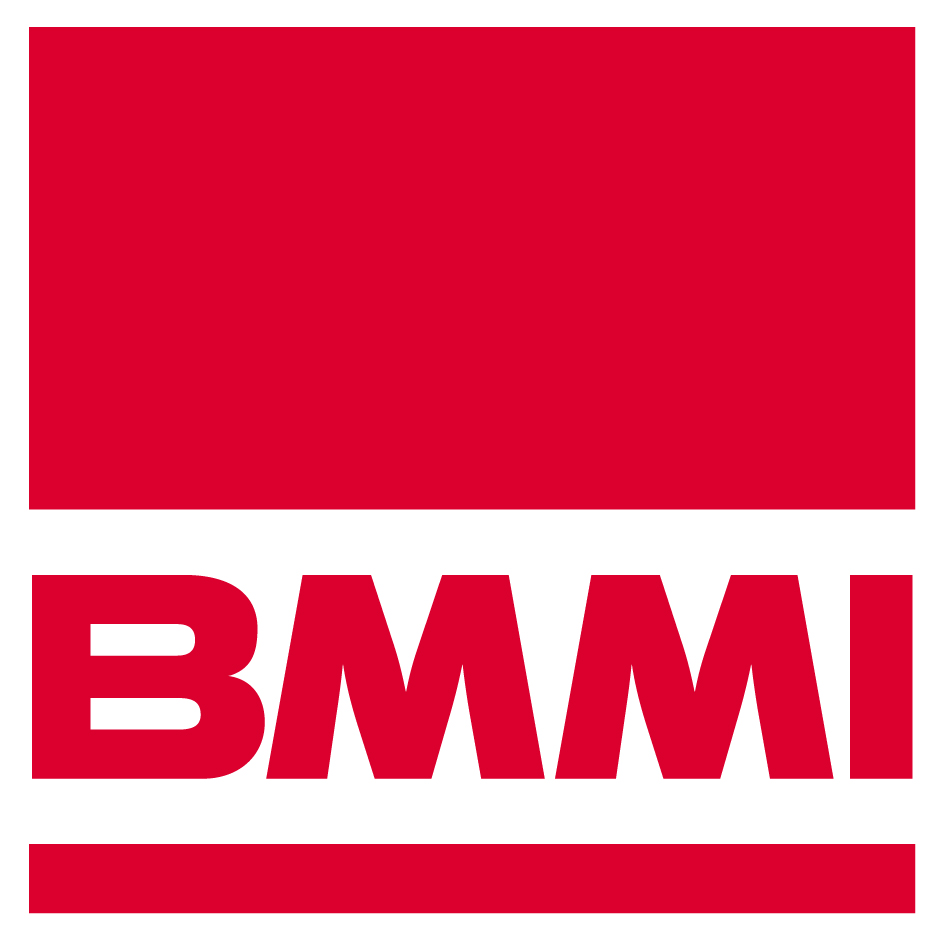
- Type: Public (BSE)
- Industry: Retailing, Distribution, Logistics
- Founded: Bahrain (1883)
- Headquarters: Sitra, Bahrain
- Key people: Marek Sheridan (CEO)
- Number of employees: 2000 (2010)
- Website: Official website

BMMI, established in 1883, is a diversified retail and distribution, hospitality and contract services and supply group based in the Kingdom of Bahrain. BMMI is a provider of facility management, logistics and procurement services to governments and to non-governmental, commercial and military organisations. The group specialises in the wholesale, distribution and retail of food and beverages.

BMMI is an independent public company and is listed on the Bahrain Stock Exchange (BSE). The Group manages its activities through branches, associates and joint ventures in Kingdom of Bahrain, Saudi Arabia, Iraq, Djibouti, Republic of Sudan and South Sudan.

== History ==
In 1883 Gray Paul, a British-owned merchant company operating in the Persian Gulf, established a local branch in Bahrain. Following a merger in 1936, the company was renamed Gray Mackenzie & Co. Limited, and in 1955 it became part of the Inchcape Group.

In 1980, the group formed a joint venture with Bahraini shareholders to form Bahrain Maritime & Mercantile International (BMMI). The new company was later listed on the Bahrain Stock Exchange. When Inchcape divested its shareholding in 1999, BMMI became a wholly Bahraini-owned public shareholding company. In 2003, the group widened its shareholding base to investors across the GCC. In 2010 the company legally changed its name from Bahrain Maritime and Mercantile International to just the acronym BMMI.

== Core business areas ==
Logistics

BMMI provides supply chain, warehousing and distribution services through its wholly-owned subsidiary Bahrain Logistics Services (BLS), which was formed in 1997. The group operates three warehousing facilities in Bahrain, in Sitra, Bahrain Logistics Zone in Hidd and in Mina Salman, which cover a total storage space of 17,000 sqm, and provide over 20,000 pallet capacity.

Beverages

BMMI Shops specialises in the distribution, wholesale, and retail of beverages in Kingdom of Bahrain. BMMI Shops currently operates a retail outlet in Mina Salman. A website was launched for home deliveries.

In 2009, the group purchased the MacAndrew's brand of Scotch whisky. MacAndrew's is currently distributed in Bahrain, the UAE and Oman.

Supermarkets

BMMI owns and operates Alosra supermarket. The group currently operates seven Alosra supermarkets in Bahrain, located at Amwaj Islands, Durrat Al Bahrain, Juffair, Riffa, Sar, Bahrain and Janabiyah.

Alosra is the first supermarket in Bahrain to implement an Integrated Management System (IMS) and has been awarded with international certification in quality, health and safety, food safety and the environment.

Convenience meals & cafés

In 2009, BMMI established its Food Production Unit (FPU), a BMMI subsidiary which produces ready-to-eat meals including salads, sandwiches, wraps and sushi rolls.

In 2015, BMMI established Delilah's, a café which operates an outlet in Amwaj Islands and Saar, and in 2016, the Group launched Elios Craft Cafe in the BMMI Tower in the Seef District.

Contract Services and Supply

Global Sourcing & Supply (GSS) is the integrated facilities management subsidiary of BMMI, providing contracted services including: Remote site and facilities management, Provision of camps and temporary structures, Rations supply, Technical sourcing and supply & Contract logistics.

GSS caters to NGOs, Mining, Infrastructure, and Oil & Gas, providing temporary structures, facility management, and food & hospitality services in the onshore and offshore sectors across the Middle East and Africa.

Contract Services

BMMI provides contract based services (warehousing, distribution and shipping) and sourcing and supply options to Government, Defence, and Energy sectors within the Middle East and Africa. BMMI runs warehousing services, located in the Kingdom of Bahrain and Republic of Djibouti.

Grocery Distribution

BMMI specialises in the distribution, wholesale and retail of food and household goods. The group represents brands in confectionery, packaged and canned food, toiletries, fragrances, cosmetics, tobacco and other domestic products. BMMI represents agencies and brands in Bahrain.

Restaurants

In 2017, BMMI opened Alto, a rooftop lounge located on the 25th floor of Downtown Rotana in Manama.

Shipping

BMMI Shipping Services offer services in Bahrain and Saudi Arabia.

== Joint ventures and subsidiaries ==
UQLC

In 2013, BMMI entered into a joint venture with Gulftainer Group, a UAE based company, for the provision of warehousing, camp design, office management and facility management in Umm Qasr, Iraq. The joint venture with Gulftainer operates in the Umm Qasr Port where BMMI manages different facilities accommodating employees and visitors working in the port.
