= Management system =

Set of practices used by an organization

A management system is a set of policies, processes and procedures used by an organization to ensure that it can fulfill the tasks required to achieve its objectives. These objectives cover many aspects of the organization's operations (including product quality, worker management, safe operation, client relationships, regulatory conformance and financial success). For instance, a quality management system enables organizations to improve their quality performance, an environmental management system enables organizations to improve their environmental performance, and an occupational health and safety management system enables organizations to improve their occupational health and safety performance, can be run in an integrated management system.

The international standard ISO 9000:2015 (Title: Quality management systems - fundamentals and vocabulary) defines the term in chapter 3.5.3 as a "set of interrelated or interacting elements of an organization to establish policies and objectives, and processes to achieve those objectives".

A simplification of the main aspects of a management system is the 4-element "plan, do, check, act" approach. A complete management system covers every aspect of management and focuses on supporting the performance management to achieve the objectives. The management system should be subject to continuous improvement as the organization learns.

== Examples ==
Examples of management system standards include:

- ISO 9000: standards for quality management systems (QMS)
- ISO 13485: standard for medical devices
- ISO 14000: standards for environmental management systems
- ISO/IEC 20000: standards for service management systems (SMS)
- ISO 22000: standards for food safety management systems (FSMS)
- ISO/IEC 27000: standards for information security management systems (ISMS)
- ISO 30301: standard for records (information and documentation)
- ISO 37001: standard for anti-bribery
- ISO 45001: standard for occupational health and safety management systems
- ISO 50001: standard for energy management systems
- ISO 55000: standards for asset management systems
- ISO 56002: standard for innovation management systems
- FitSM: standards for lightweight IT service management
- ILO-OSH: occupational safety and health management systems
- SA 8000: standards for social accountability management systems
- IAEA management system safety standards

== See also ==
- Evolution of management systems
- Environmental management system (EMS)
- Lean integration
- Quality management system (QMS)
- Safety management system (SMS)
- Total quality management (TQM)
- Warehouse management system (WMS)
- Welfare management system (WMS)
