= Safety management system =

System to manage occupational safety risk in the workplace

An occupational safety management system (OSMS) is a management system designed to manage occupational safety and health risks in the workplace. If the system contains elements of management of longer-term health impacts and occupational disease, it may be referred to as a occupational safety and health management system (OSHMS) or occupational health and safety management system (OHSMS).

== Description ==
An OSMS provides a systematic way to continuously identify and monitor hazards and control risks while maintaining assurance that these risk controls are effective. OSMS can be defined as:

...a businesslike approach to occupational safety. It is a systematic, explicit and comprehensive process for managing occupational safety risks. As with all management systems, a occupational safety management system provides for goal setting, planning, and measuring performance. A occupational safety management system is woven into the fabric of an organization. It becomes part of the culture, the way people do their jobs.

There are three imperatives for adopting a occupational safety management system for a business – these are ethical, legal and financial. There is an implied moral obligation placed upon an employer to ensure that work activities and the place of work are safe; there are legislative requirements defined in every jurisdiction on how this is to be achieved and there is a substantial body of evidence which shows that effective occupational safety management can reduce the financial exposure and damage to the reputation of an organisation by reducing accidents.

To address these three important elements, an effective OSMS should:

- Define how the organisation is set up to manage risk.
- Identify workplace risk and implement suitable controls.
- Implement effective communications across all levels of the organisation.
- Implement a process to identify and correct non-conformity and non-compliance issues.
- Implement a continual improvement process.

The foundation to an effective occupational safety management system is that of effective risk management. The defined process within an organisation for the identification, assessment, evaluation and control (or risk treatment) of risk will be key, must be carefully considered and then documented within the occupational safety management system. As with occupational safety management, there are a number of risk management models that can be used depending on the risk profile of an organisation, but the internationally recognised standard ISO 31000 - Risk management – Guidelines is a common starting point. Interestingly, there is no reference to safety within the standard.

== Historical context ==
Occupational safety management evolved as a counterweight to the exploitation of workers in industry through the 19th and 20th centuries. As the industrial revolution opened up substantial commercial opportunities in Western societies, the financial imperative of business owners and industrialists lead to the use of an exploited, unskilled and uneducated workforce including child labour and rural migrant workers, often in working conditions where injury and death were day to day occurrences.

It became the remit of legislators with a social conscience to understand that governments had a moral and legal responsibility to protect workers using general and industry specific occupational safety legislation. In the UK, the early 19th century Factory Acts were a significant development for gradually improving occupational safety through the decades, in fact the last iteration was made in 1961. This evolving environment was also the driving force behind the formation of the trade union or labour union movements and worker representation in the early 19th century across Europe and America which developed through the decades into representation in wage and working condition negotiations, but also in protecting the health, safety and welfare of workers.

One clear example of how unsafe and dangerous work conditions had become during the industrial revolution can be seen in this extract relating to an early 20th century mining disaster in West Virginia, USA.

As the 19th century closed out and the 20th century began, West Virginia had become a more dangerous place to mine than most.

West Virginia fell far behind other major coal-producing states in regulating mining conditions. Between 1890 and 1912, West Virginia had a higher mine death rate than any other state. West Virginia was the site of numerous deadly coal mining accidents, including the nation's worst coal disaster. On December 6, 1907, an explosion at a mine owned by the Fairmont Coal Company in Monongah, Marion County, killed 361. One historian has suggested that during World War I, a U.S. soldier had a better statistical chance of surviving in battle than did a West Virginian working in the coal mines.

The drivers that were to positively influence mine safety as the 20th century progressed included; improvements in mining legislation with regulatory oversight and in occupational health and safety legislation, involvement by trade unions to improve workers’ rights and working conditions, developments in mining technologies and a more general acceptance in wider society that such high levels of fatalities were no longer acceptable.

As research into occupational medicine improved, it had become possible to start to identify industrial diseases and illnesses caused by exposure to industry specific hazards such as coal dust in mining (miners black lung or coalworker's pneumoconiosis), asbestos in construction (asbestosis and mesothelioma), exposure to physical agents such as occupational noise from industrial machinery (hearing loss, tinnitus or deafness) and vibration hazards from tools and equipment (hand-arm vibration syndrome and vibration white finger). These disabling and often fatal hazard vectors could then be targeted by legislation to reduce worker exposure to these dangerous substances and activities.

As more industry specific and general safety, health and welfare related legislation started to be introduced, it became necessary for employers to have a framework within which these safety regulations could be understood, managed and the legal requirements implemented. This was necessary, not just to comply with regulations but to also avoid fines and legal costs for non-compliance, increased insurance and workers compensation costs due to accidents and especially in the U.S. increasingly expensive criminal and civil liability lawsuits for death and injury caused at work.

== Basic occupational safety management components ==
=== International Labour Organization OSMS model ===
The ILO guidance document is one of the most basic and adaptable models for organizations to utilize when developing a occupational safety management system. In the ILO guidance document, the basic occupational safety management components are:

1. Policy – Establish within policy statements the requirements for sufficient resources; define top management commitment and state occupational safety and health (OSH) targets.
2. Organizing – How is the organization structured; how is responsibility and accountability defined; how does the organization communicate internally and externally; what documentation is required and how is training and competency defined.
3. Planning and Implementation – How does the organization plan for, develop and implement its approach to risk management; how are hazards identified and risk effectively managed; what goals and objectives are set to drive OHS performance and measure progress; what arrangements are made for contingency and emergency situations.
4. Evaluation – How is OSH performance measured and assessed; what is the processes for the reporting and investigation of accidents and incidents; what internal and external audit processes are in place to review and verify the system.
5. Action for Improvement – How are corrective and preventive action created, managed and closed out; what processes are in place to ensure the continual improvement process.

Although other occupational safety management models may use different terminology, the basic components and workflow for occupational safety management systems will be the same. The desired outcome is an effective Plan, Do, Check, Act (PDCA) process where the goal is that of continual and measurable improvement.

== Relationship to other business management practices ==
An OSMS is intended to act as a part of the business administration system for an organization to effectively meet its legal obligations under applicable occupational safety and health laws. The scope of the organization's operations and therefore its risk profile will determine how the OSMS is structured and what resources are required to manage occupational health and safety risk effectively. Occupational safety management should be considered as a part of the overall business management system of an organization and not an add-on to it. Due to the close association between health and safety, occupational safety management systems (OSMS) are increasingly known as occupational safety and health management system (OSHMS) or occupational health and safety management system (OHSMS). Further, management standards across a range of business functions such as safety, environment and quality are now being designed so that these traditionally disparate elements can be integrated and managed within a single business management system and not as separate and stand-alone functions. Therefore, some organizations dovetail other management system functions, such as safety management, environmental management and quality management together with occupational safety management to meet both regulatory requirements, industry sector requirements and their own internal and discretionary standard requirements.

Effective occupational safety management means that organizations need to ensure they are looking at all occupational safety risks within the organization as a single system, rather than having multiple, competing, 'Safety Management Silos'. If safety is not seen holistically, it can interfere with the prioritization of improvements or even result in safety issues being missed. For example, after the March 2005 BP Texas City refinery explosion, investigations concluded that the company had put too much emphasis on personal safety thus ignoring the safety of their processes. The antidote to such silo thinking is the proper evaluation of all risks, a key aspect of an effective OSMS.

== Development of occupational safety management standards ==
=== Industry sector standards ===
Over time, particular occupational safety management models can become a preferred standard within an industry sector which is an approach often driven by industry representative bodies or trade associations. In industries where public occupational safety is a prime consideration or where organisations operate in a high risk industry sector, specific regulations may be introduced which detail requirements that fit the industry risk profile, such as the OSHA requirement for a process occupational safety management system.

Industry specific occupational safety management include:

- The International Association of Oil & Gas Producers (IOGP) standard Operating Management System (OMS) for the oil and gas industry,
- The International Civil Aviation Organization has recommended that all aviation authorities implement OSMS regulatory structures.
- Federal Aviation Authority - Safety Management System (SMS) for Airports - Guidance, Tools, & Related Information
- The European Aviation Safety Agency (EASA) began the process of implementing Safety Management System (SMS) regulations by issuing Terms of Reference (TOR) on July 18, 2011.

In aviation, safety management systems have been formalized through ICAO Annex 19 and the Safety Management Manual, which support state safety programmes and require service providers—such as airlines, air navigation service providers, maintenance organizations, and aerodromes—to implement SMS in a structured way. Helicopter and other rotorcraft operators have adapted SMS frameworks for higher-risk operations, including offshore transport and emergency medical services, supported by sector-specific toolkits from the former International Helicopter Safety Team and the European Helicopter Safety Team, as well as offshore recommended practices that integrate SMS with flight-data monitoring, line operations safety audits, and training standards. Some modern aviation SMS initiatives also incorporate structured peer-support and mental-health programs for pilots, such as the U.S. Helicopter Safety Team’s Peer Pilot Program, which offers confidential peer assistance as part of a wider rotorcraft safety effort.

Regulatory requirements for a occupational safety management system include:

- The International Maritime Organization (IMO) adopted the ISM Code in 2002 to provide an international standard for the safe management and operation of ships and for pollution prevention.
- Transport Canada’s Rail Safety Directorate incorporated SMS into the rail industry in 2001. The Rail Safety Management System requirements are set out in the Railway Safety Management System Regulations.
- Occupational Safety and Health Administration (OSHA) - The Process Safety Management of Highly Hazardous Chemicals standard (29 CFR 1910.119)

Independent occupational safety management standards include:

- The American National Standards Institute and the American Society of Safety Professionals ANSI/ASSP Z10.0 standard helps to establish OSH management systems to improve employee safety, reduce workplace risks and create better working conditions. It is one of the most comprehensive systems-based standards for improving OSH performance and provides an architecture that each organization can customize to their individual needs.
- The International Organization for Standardization (ISO) ISO 45001:2018 - Occupational health and safety management systems specifies requirements for an occupational health and safety (OH&S) management system, and gives guidance for its use, to enable organizations to provide safe and healthy workplaces by preventing work-related injury and ill health, as well as by proactively improving its OH&S performance.

=== National and international standards ===
Many countries have developed national occupational safety management models that have become adopted by organizations across a wide range of industries. National standards draw on experience and knowledge from a wide variety of organizations and individuals and can provide a uniform and consistent framework in which to work. In addition, such standards can be externally accessed and certified.

These standards have a number of benefits:

- When widely used, they provide for a consistent approach to managing safety across a wide range of industries.
- When implemented, they result in improvements in safety performance, productivity and employee morale.
- Current and future legislation can be easily incorporated into the occupational safety management system which promotes compliance.
- As new systems develop, it is generally easier to migrate to a new system when an established system is already in place.
- For certified systems, certification implies effective conformance to the standard.
- Many clients and customers see certification against a occupational safety management system as an added value proposition.

The Occupational Health and Safety Assessment Series 18001 (OHSAS 18001) standard from 1999 was an attempt to consolidate and establish a definitive certifiable standard internationally, taking lessons and best practice from many national standards. It was widely adopted with a revision undertaken in 2007. The Occupational Health and Safety Assessment Series Project Group was independent of the International Organization for Standardization (ISO). OHSAS 18001:2007 Occupational health and safety management systems — Requirements with guidance for use standard was withdrawn and replaced by the ISO 45001:2018 Occupational health and safety management systems — Requirements with guidance for use standard

One significant development that ISO 45001 has introduced is compatibility with the ISO 14001 environmental management and the ISO 9001 quality management standards.

== See also ==
- OHSAS 18001
- Occupational Health and Safety Assessment Series Project Group
- ISO 45001
- International Organization for Standardization
- ALARP
- PDCA
- Corrective and preventive action
- International Labour Organization
- Trade union
- Process safety
- Occupational safety and health
- Factory Acts
