= Kuwait Finance House =

Kuwaiti bank

- Headquarters of the bank
- Native name: بيت التمويل الكويتي
- Type: Public bank
- Traded as: BK: KFH; BB: KFH
- ISIN: KW0EQ0100085
- Industry: Banking
- Founded: 1977; 49 years ago
- Founders: Consortium of Kuwaiti merchants
- Headquarters: Kuwait City, Kuwait
- Number of locations: 631 (2025)
- Key people: Hamad Abdulmohsen Al-Marzook (Chairman); Khaled AlShamlan (Group CEO)
- Operating income: KWD 1,2 billion (2025) (USD 3,9 billion)
- Total assets: KWD 42,7 billion (2025) (USD 138.2 billion)
- Total equity: KWD 5,74 billion (2025) (USD 18,55 billion)
- Number of employees: 17 500 (2025)
- Website: www.kfh.com

Kuwait Finance House (Arabic: بيت التمويل الكويتي) (KFH) is a Kuwaiti bank, founded in 1977, as the first bank operating in accordance with the Islamic Shari'a rulings. KFH is listed on the Kuwait Stock Exchange (KSE).

KFH is a major player in the international sukuk market, the volume of which for KFH trading group reached US$11.4 billion in 2016.

== History ==
Kuwait Finance House was established in 1977 as Kuwait's first Islamic bank. It received 170 applications to open new accounts on its first day of operation on 31 August 1978. KFH opened in temporary headquarters on Ahmad Al-Jaber Street, before moving to the Emad Commercial Center in 1983 and then its present-day location on Abdullah Al-Mubarek Street in 1986. By 1983, KFH was the only Islamic Bank listed on the Banker's list of the top 100 Arab Banks. In 1984, KFH was listed on the Kuwait Stock Exchange. In 1989, KFH's subsidiary in Turkey, Kuveyt Turk Participation Bank, was established by a Turkish cabinet decree.

KFH Capital Investment Company was formed in 1999 to invest in the public equity, private equity, and real estate markets across the globe. KFH Capital is the main investment of the bank, with offices in Safat, Kuwait and Oman.

In 2002, KFH opened its first branch in Bahrain and in 2005 KFH Malaysia was established, becoming the first Islamic bank to be granted a license in the county under the 1983 Islamic Banking Act. Since then, KFH and Kuveyt Turk have established a presence in the Kingdom of Saudi Arabia, Jordan, the UAE and Germany.

In July 2017, KFH studied a merger with Ahli United Bank, and on 25th September 2022 KFH completed the merger of Ahli United Bank by BHD 4.1billion.

KFH was ranked fifth on Forbes Middle East's 30 Most Valuable Banks 2025 list. It also ranked ninth on Forbes Middle East's Top 100 Listed Companies 2025 list.

== International Operations ==
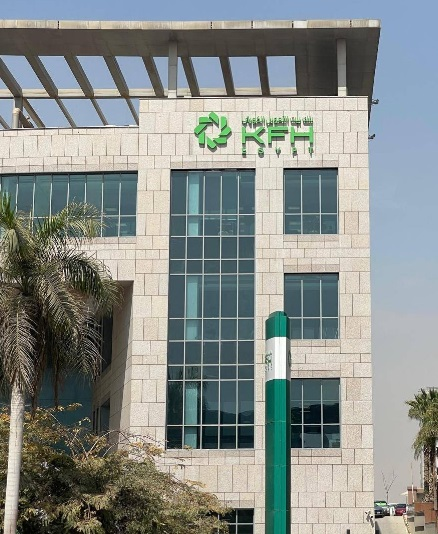
Headquarters of the Branch in Egypt

- Bahrain: KFH officially entered the Bahraini market in October 2002. in 2025 the mega merged with bahraini bank Ahli United Bank was completed and consolidated its operations.
- Egypt: KFH entered the Egyptian market in 2022 after acquiring Ahli United Bank operations.
- Iraq: 85% shareholding of Commercial Islamic Bank of Iraq.
- Malaysia: On August 8, 2005, KFH Malaysia commenced branch operations. At the end of 2024, the bank announced its withdrawal from the Malaysian market by the end of 2026 to focus its operations on the Persian Gulf.
- Saudi Arabia: Entering the market in 2007 as a Wholesale banking.
- Turkey: Operates as Kuveyt Türk Bank. since 1989. It has branches in Germany.
- United Arab Emirates: Entering the market in 2004 as a Wholesale banking.

== Ownership ==
This is the ownership structure after the merger of Kuwait Finance House with Ahli United Bank:

- 16.80% – Kuwait Investment Authority
- 9.19% – Kuwait Public Institution for Social Security Fund
- 7.32% – Kuwait Public Authority of Minor Affairs
- 5.09% – Kuwait Awqaf Public Foundation
- 3.08% – Bahrian Social Insurance Organization
- 1.71% – Tamdeen Investment Co.
- 1.67% – Sheikh Salem Sabah Al Naser AlSabah

== Awards ==
- Straight Through Processing (STP) award 2016 from Citibank
- Best Islamic Project Finance Provider 2016 from Global Finance
- Best Islamic Financial Institution in GCC 2016 from Global Finance
- Best Bank in Kuwait 2015 from EMEA Finance
- Best Islamic Bank in Kuwait 2015 from EMEA Finance
- Best Islamic Bank in Kuwait 2015 from Islamic Finance News Magazine
- Europe Best Digital Participation Bank KFH Turkey from Global Finance
