= Ministry of Finance & National Economy (Bahrain) =

Government ministry of Bahrain

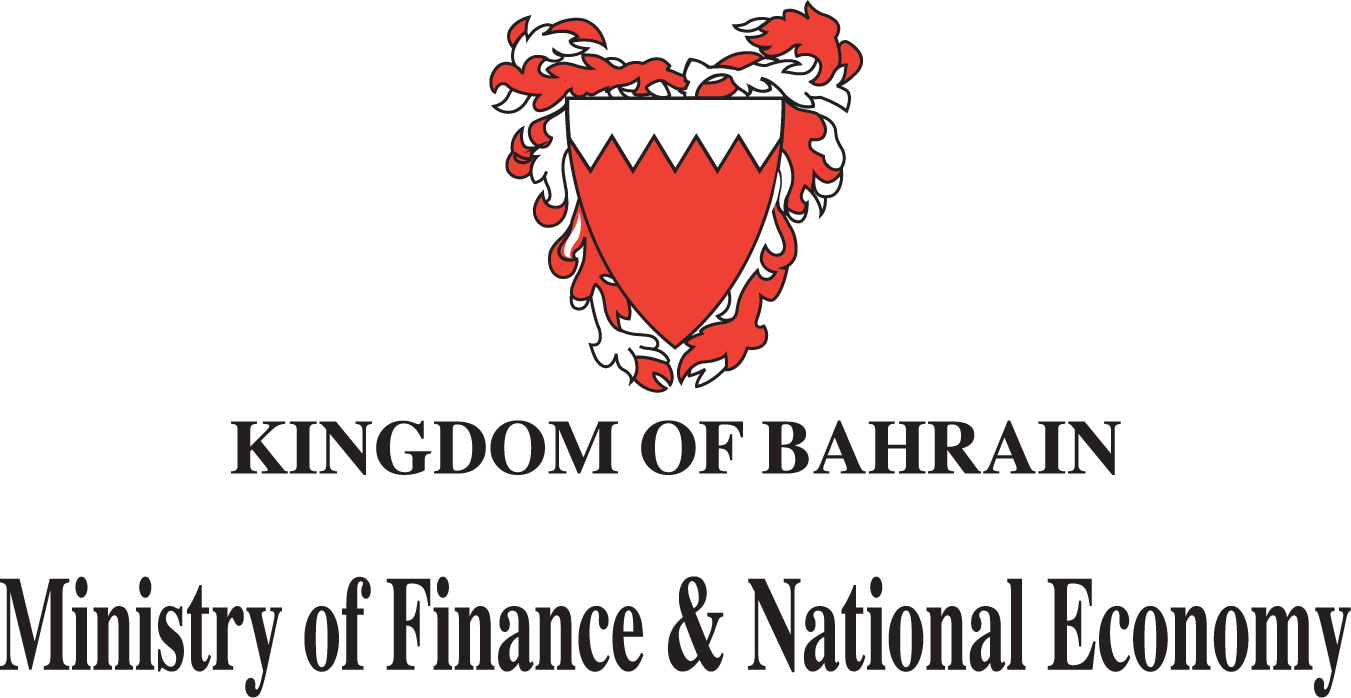

Ministry overview
- Formed: 1970 (56 years ago)
- Preceding Ministry: Ministry of Finance & National Economy (MOFNE)
- Type: Government Ministry
- Jurisdiction: Cabinet of Bahrain
- Headquarters: Diplomatic Area, Manama; 26°14′32.6″N 50°35′07.9″E
- Employees: 350 (2018)
- Minister responsible: Shaikh Salman bin Khalifa Al Khalifa
- Website: www.mofne.gov.bh

The Ministry of Finance & National Economy (MOFNE) is responsible for formulating and implementing the financial policies of the Kingdom of Bahrain within the overall vision of the Bahrain Government. The Ministry prepares the state general budget in coordination with other ministries and public entities in a way that reflects the financial and economic objectives of the Kingdom, particularly regarding improving living standards and increasing levels of economic growth.

MOFNE assures the progress of public investment in compliance with the financial policies of the kingdom. It also manages the public debt and maintains its levels within internationally approved limits. Financial stability is sought through the best allocation of available financial resources.

In order to enhance bilateral relations with other countries in financial and economic areas, the ministry has entered into, and is in the process of, negotiating a number of bilateral and multilateral agreements to provide a legal framework for these relations. These agreements include, Inter Alia, 'Agreements on the Promotion and Protection of Investments', 'Agreements on the Avoidance of Double Taxation', 'Free trade Agreements and Memoranda of Understanding on Financial and Economic Cooperation'.

The current Minister of Finance & National Economy is Shaikh Salman bin Khalifa Al-Khalifa, who was appointed on 4 December 2018.

== History ==
In the early 70s, the State administrative apparatus was regulated by Decree No. (1) of 1970 establishing the State Council, which was then the cabinet. The State Council was mandated to carry out all tasks and responsibilities relating to the administration and organization of all executive affairs of the country, including State finance affairs, namely the preparation of the State budget as well as State public plan for the development of national economy and taking the necessary measures to implement them in accordance with the provisions of the laws-in-force. That Decree was subsequently followed by the issuance of many decrees and resolutions that regulate the Government executive apparatus. The following is a summary of the most important decrees and legislations relating to the organization of the Ministry of Finance from its establishment till the present time:

On 19 January 1970, Decree No. (2) of 1970 on State administrative organization was issued, organizing the Department of Finance and National Economy, which included the Directorates of Finance, Oil, Housing, Customs and Ports, and Posts.

After Bahrain’s independence, the State administrative structure was reorganized pursuant to Amiri Decree No. (2) of 1971 as well as Decree No. (3) of 1971 restructuring the Department of Finance and National Economy and the Department of Labor and Social Affairs. In this amendment, the Housing Department was moved from the Department of Finance and National Economy to the Department of Labor and Social Affairs.

After the appointment of Mr. Ibrahim Abdul-Karim as Director of the Directorate of Oil and Economy within the Department of Finance and National Economy under Resolution No. (3) of 1971, Decree No. (26) of 1972 was issued appointing him as Undersecretary of the Ministry of Finance and National Economy on 31 December 1972.

In 1975, Amiri Decree No. (13) was issued, in accordance with which the Ministry of Finance was formed, in addition to the appointment of 15 ministers in the Government, including the appointment of Mr. Mahmoud Al-Sayed Ahmed Al-Alawi as Minister of Finance. In the same year, the Economy was separated from the Finance, as the Amiri Decree No. (15) of 1975 was issued, renaming the Ministry of Commerce and Industry as the Ministry of Commerce, Agriculture and Economy.

On 2 June 1976, Amiri Decree No. (5) of 1976 was issued, whereby the Ministry of Finance and the Ministry of Commerce, Agriculture and Economy were renamed. The Ministry of Finance was renamed as the Ministry of Finance and National Economy, and the Decree No. (6) of 1976 was issued appointing Mr. Ibrahim Abdul-Karim Mohamed as Minister of Finance and National Economy.

Amiri Decree No. (8) of 1976 was issued on 14 June 1976 amending Article (1) of the Amiri Decree No. (26) of 1975, restructuring the Ministry of Finance and National Economy to include the following Directorates:

- Planning and Economic Affairs
- Statistics
- General Organization for Pension funds
- State Budget
- Accounts
- Property and Services
- Customs
- Ports

Amiri Decree No. No. (14) of 1979 was issued establishing the Directorate of Central Stores at the Ministry of Finance and National Economy, followed by the Decree No. (2) of 1983 restructuring the Ministry of Finance and National Economy, and then the Decree No. (4) of 1994 reorganizing the Ministry of Finance and National Economy.

On 31 May 1999, the Amiri Decree No. (8) of 1999 was issued appointing Mr. Abdullah Hassan Saif as Minister of Finance and National Economy.

On 30 April 2003, Decree No. (35) of 2003 was issued, whereby a General Directorate of Free Trade Zones was established at the Customs and Ports Affairs of the Ministry of Finance and National Economy.

On 14 January 2005, Decree No. (7) of 2005 was issued with ministerial appointments including the appointment of Sheikh Ahmed bin Mohamed Al Khalifa as Minister of Finance.

On 8 May 2005, Decree No. (31) of 2005 was issued amending some of the provisions of Decree No. (9) of 2003 on the establishment and organization of the Economic Development Board, according to which some of the responsibilities and competencies of the Ministry were transferred to the Economic Development Board.

Decree No. (9) of 2007 was issued reorganizing the Ministry of Finance as follows:

- Customs, Ports and Free Trade Zones Affairs, reporting to the Minister of Finance.
- Monitoring and Follow-up Directorate, reporting to the Undersecretary of the Ministry of Finance.
- Assistant Undersecretary for Economic Affairs, responsible for:
  - External Economic Relations Directorate
  - Economic Studies and Research Directorate
  - Government Investment Directorate
  - Privatization and Outsourcing Directorate
- Assistant Undersecretary for Financial Affairs, responsible for:
  - Budget Directorate
  - Project Directorate
  - Treasury Directorate
  - Financial Systems Development Directorate
- Assistant Undersecretary for Resources and Information, responsible for:
  - Human and Financial Resources Directorate
  - Financial Information Directorate
  - Government Properties Affairs Directorate

On 2 June 2008, Decree No. (43) of 2008 was issued amending Decree No. (69) of 2004 on the reorganization of the Ministry of Interior, in accordance with which Customs Affairs was transferred from the Ministry of Finance to the Ministry of Interior.

On 30 June 2008, Decree No. (53) of 2008 was issued, whereby the position of Undersecretary for Ports Affairs was established in the Ministry of Finance, then Decree No. (70) of 2012 was subsequently issued on 21 October 2008 according to which the Undersecretary for Ports Affairs is to report to the Ministry of Transport and Communication.

On 28 May 2009, Decree No. (51) of 2009 was issued amending Decree No. (9) of 2007 on the reorganization of the Ministry of Finance, whereby the position of Assistant Undersecretary for Public Revenue Development was established, and two new Directorates were established in the Ministry of Finance to report to the Assistant Undersecretary for the Public Revenue Development, namely:

- Enterprise Tax Directorate
- Value Added Tax Directorate

On 30 June 2010, Decree No. (28) of 2010 was issued amending Decree No. (9) of 2007 on the reorganization of the Ministry of Finance, including the establishment of the State Property Affairs Directorate, answerable to the Assistant Undersecretary for Resources and Information.

On 4 April 2017, Decree No. (24) of 2017 was issued amending some of the provisions of Decree No. (9) of 2007 on the reorganization of the Ministry of Finance, including the establishment of Public Revenue Policies Directorate, reporting to the Assistant Undersecretary of Public Revenue Development, and the abolition of the Economic Studies and Research Directorate.

On 4 December 2018 Salman bin Khalifa Al-Khalifa was appointed Minister and the name of the Ministry was changed to Ministry of Finance and National Economy.

== About the ministry ==
=== Vision ===
To achieve optimal financial stability in order to make the Kingdom of Bahrain the center of excellence in the region for financial planning, management, and control, and to contribute in sustainable economic growth through developing and following up the implementation of sound financial policies.

== List of ministers ==
- Mr. Mahmoud Al-Sayed Ahmed Al-Alawi (August 1975 – June 1976)
- Mr. Ibrahim Abdul-Karim Mohamed (June 1976 – May 1999)
- Mr. Abdulla Hassan Saif (May 1999 – January 2005)
- Sheikh Ahmed bin Mohamed Al Khalifa (14 January 2005 - November 2018)
- Shaikh Salman bin Khalifa Al-Khalifa (4 December 2018 – present)

== Sources ==
- Hassan Ali Falah, ed. (1994). The development of the general budget in Bahrain between 1924 and 1993. Manama: Government Press Office of the Ministry of Information.
