= Diplomatic Area, Bahrain =

Central business district section

Diplomatic Area المنطقة الدبلوماسية
- Central business district
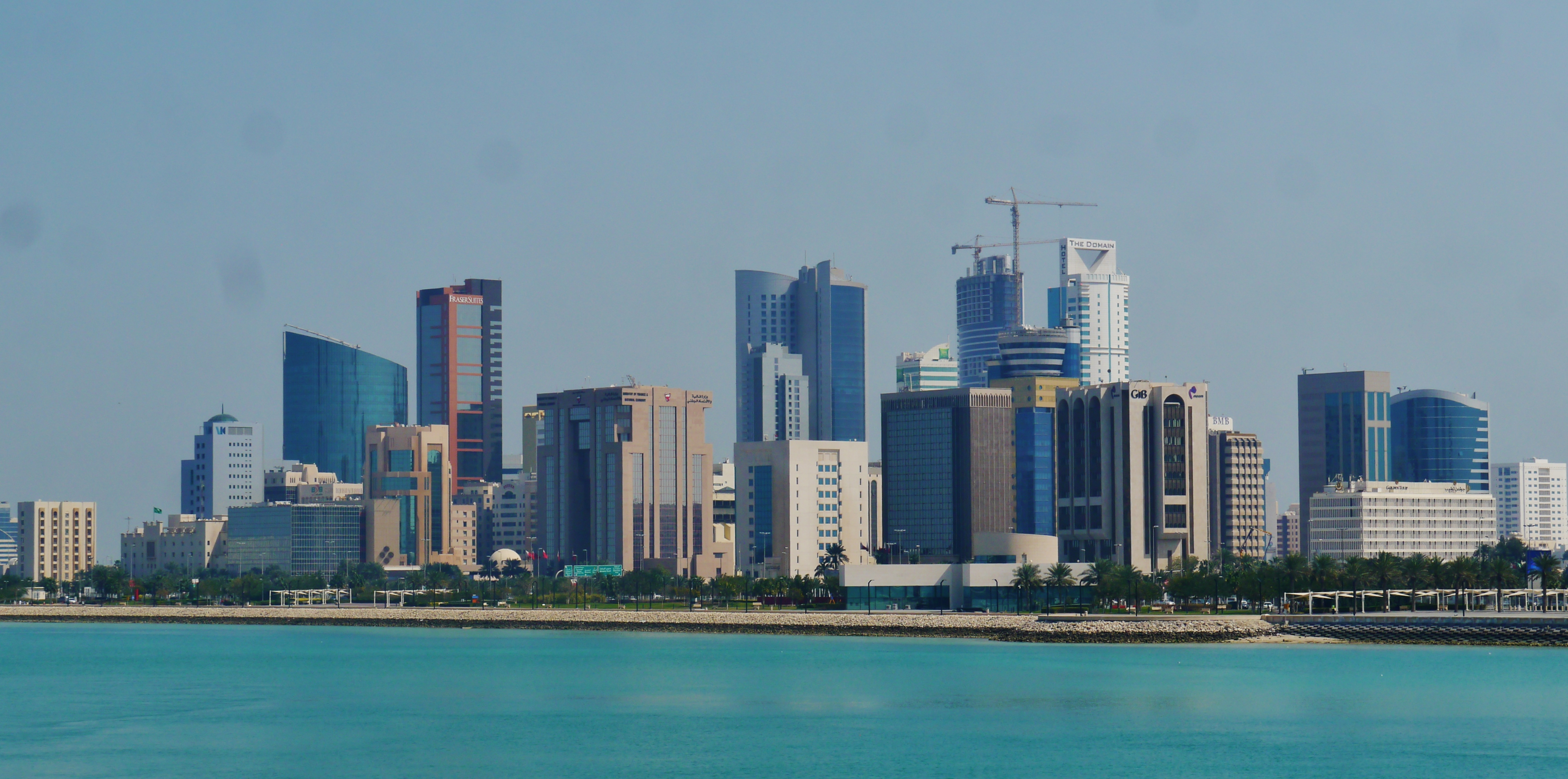
- The Diplomatic Area

- Location in Bahrain
- Coordinates: 26.2417°N 50.5944°E
- Country: Bahrain
- Governorate: Capital Governorate
- City: Manama
- Land reclamation: 1970s–1980s

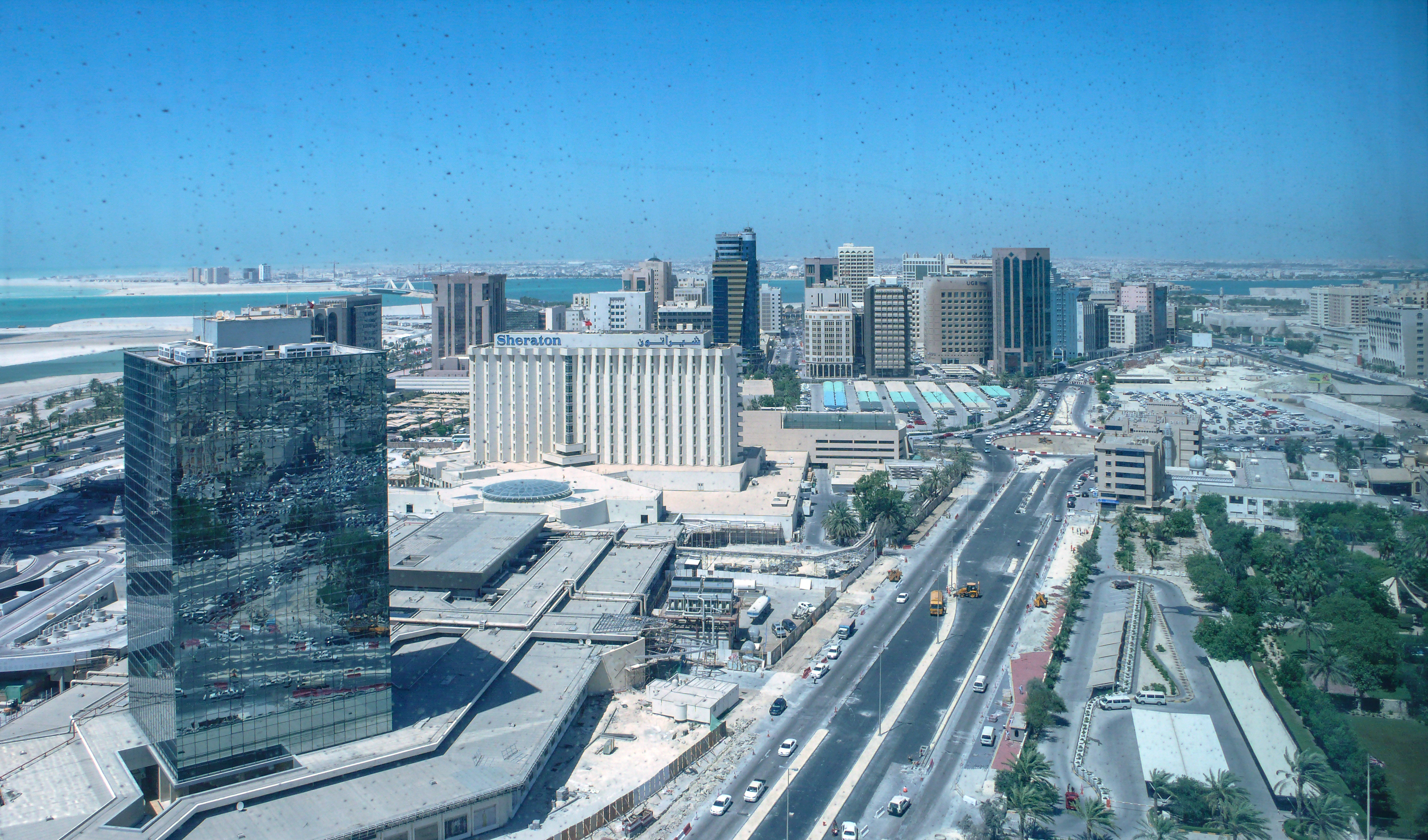
View of the Diplomatic Area in 2007.

The Diplomatic Area (Arabic: المنطقة الدبلوماسية; transliterated: al-Mantiqah ad-Diblomasiyah) is an area that is located within the Central Business District of Manama, the capital city of Bahrain, an island kingdom in the Persian Gulf.

Constructed on reclaimed land in the 1970s and gradually expanding in the 1980s, the Diplomatic Area is Manama's financial district, housing hundreds of banks, investment firms and Takaful societies that serve the entire Persian Gulf. It is mainly composed of high-rise office blocks and government buildings.

== Ministries and banks ==
Diplomatic area from the ground.

Most of the government ministries like the Ministry of Finance, Ministry of Housing and the Ministry of Justice have their offices in the Diplomatic Area. The Central Bank of Bahrain is also headquartered in the Diplomatic Area. The Diplomatic Area also houses the Public Prosecution and the court of Bahrain. Skyscrapers like the Bahrain World Trade Centre are located in the Diplomatic Area.

== Embassies ==
- Saudi Arabia Embassy
- Kuwait Embassy

== Culture ==
Bahrain National Museum is located in the Diplomatic District along the Manama bay. It is Bahrain's largest and most popular museum. Beit Al Quran (The House of Quran) is also located in the Diplomatic Area. The House of the Quran was built to accommodate a comprehensive and valuable collection of the Quran and manuscripts, a concept which is unique in the Persian Gulf. The National Theatre of Bahrain was opened next to the Bahrain National Museum in November 2012.

== Shopping ==
The Diplomatic Area also has shopping districts within it. The Manama Souk is located in the area. It is one of Bahrain's oldest shopping districts, housing traditional shops and coffee houses. A high-end shopping complex, Moda Mall Bahrain at The Bahrain World Trade Centre is also located in the area. It houses designer stores such as Dior, Louis Vuitton, Hermès, Fendi, Gucci, Kenzo, Lanvin, Max Mara, Dolce & Gabbana, Burberry, Emporio Armani, Escada, Valentino, Bottega Veneta, Roberto Cavalli and more. The mall also features a number of fine jewelry boutiques including De Beers, Tiffany & Co., Boucheron, Chopard, Van Cleef & Arpels, Cartier and Rolex, among others.

== Hotels ==
There are a number of hotels in the Diplomatic area, mostly high-end. The Crowne Plaza hotel, managed by IHG group of hotels is one among them, which has been around for the past 35 years. The other is something of an institution in Manama, is the aptly named 'Diplomat Hotel'. As of 2010, the 'Dip' is managed by Radisson Hotels.
