= Al Muntazah =

Bahraini supermarket chain

Al Muntazah Markets
- Type: Private
- Industry: Retail
- Founded: July 23, 1984; 42 years ago in Muharraq, Bahrain
- Founder: Jalal Al Meer
- Headquarters: Bahrain
- Area served: Bahrain
- Products: Groceries and household goods
- Services: Supermarkets; Convenience retail
- Parent: Al Meer Group
- Website: almeergroup.com

Al Muntazah Markets is a Bahraini supermarket chain owned by Al Meer Group. The chain operates in the food retail sector and has expanded through a network of branches across the kingdom.

== History ==
Al Muntazah began in 1982 on the initiative of Jalal Al Meer, founder of Al Meer Trading Establishment, after the family business identified demand for a modern supermarket chain in Bahrain. After two years of planning and procurement, the first Al Muntazah branch opened in Muharraq on 23 July 1984.

In 2002, the supermarket chain led a consumer boycott of American brands against Israel's hostility towards Palestinians in West Bank and the Occupied Territories.

By 2006, the chain had expanded to 11 branches in Bahrain. In 2015, the company further extended its operations by opening its first Al Muntazah Express branch in Muharraq. The second express branch is due to open in the city of Rifa'a by the first quarter of 2016. In 2021, Diyar Al Muharraq announced that Al Muntazah would open a traditionally themed branch at Souq Al Baraha in Diyar Al Muharraq. At the official inauguration of the Diyar Al Muharraq branch in January 2022, Bahrain's Ministry of Industry and Commerce said that Al Muntazah had reached 12 branches, including main and express outlets, and was serving about eight million customers annually.

In October 2025, after reports and social media rumours about branch closures, the company said that its branches were still operating and that it was working through supply chain and financial challenges.

== Operations ==
Al Muntazah Markets operates as one of Bahrain's local supermarket chains and forms part of the Al Meer Group's retail activities. Its outlets sell groceries and everyday consumer products, and the company has also operated express-format branches in Bahrain.
