= Bahrain Bourse =

Stock exchange in Bahrain

Coordinates: 26°14′15″N 50°34′24″E

Bahrain Bourse بورصة البحرين
- Type: Stock Exchange
- Location: Bahrain Financial Harbour, Manama, Bahrain
- Founded: 1987
- Key people: Abdulkareem Ahmed Bucheery (Chairman)
- Currency: BHD
- Website: bahrainbourse.com

The Bahrain Bourse, also called the Bahrain Stock Exchange (BSE), is the stock exchange of Bahrain. As at 2017, 42 companies were listed on the exchange. The exchange operates from Sunday to Thursday. Three indices track the Bahrain Bourse (BHB): the Bahrain All Share Index, the Dow Jones Bahrain Index and the Estirad Index.

The BSE was established in 1987 by Amiri decree and officially commenced operations on 17 June 1989, with 29 listed companies. It operated as an autonomous institution supervised by an independent Board of Directors, chaired by the Governor of the Central Bank of Bahrain. Bahrain Bourse (BHB) was established as a shareholding company under Law No. 60 of 2010 that replaced the BSE.

The Bahrain Bourse is a member of the Federation of Euro-Asian Stock Exchanges.

== Foreign ownership of securities ==
As of 2015 foreigners can purchase, own or sell bonds, units of mutual funds, and warrants of domestic joint-stock companies. Foreigners who reside in Bahrain for one year or more can purchase, own, and/or trade up to 49% of a domestic joint-stock company's equities. However, an individual foreigner may not own more than 1% of a company's issued capital.

There are ten companies that are completely open to foreign investors: Bank ABC (ABC), Arab Insurance Group (ARIG), Ahli United Bank (AUB), Al Baraka Banking Group (BARKA), Bahrain Middle East Bank (BMB), Ithmaar Bank (ITHMR), Investcorp Bank (INVCORP), Bahrain Shamil Bank (SHAMIL), Al Salam Bank (SALAM), and TAIB Bank (TAIB).

Foreign security holders are legally entitled to enjoy all the benefits of the ownership of securities of domestic joint-stock companies. They have voting rights on all matters submitted for approval, and receive dividends and other distributions tax free.

== Taxation ==
There are no capital gains or dividend taxes in Bahrain on both foreigners and nationals.

== Trading and settlement regulations ==
Securities listed on the BSE, with certain exceptions, must be traded on the floor through registered brokers, who are subject to standards and operate under terms, laws and by-laws of the BSE.

Settlements and transfers of ownership of domestic joint stock securities are undertaken through the BSE. The sale and purchase of a security creates a binding contract on the part of the seller to deliver the security and on the part of the purchaser to make payment on the settlement date. The settlement period is two days after the trading date, (T+2).

The BSE management is continuously monitoring and reviewing the exchange's existing laws and procedures in an effort to further develop and enhance its contribution to the economy of Bahrain.

== See also ==
- List of Mideast stock exchanges
- List of stock exchanges
