= Central Bank of Bahrain =

Central Bank of Bahrain مصرف البحرين المركزي

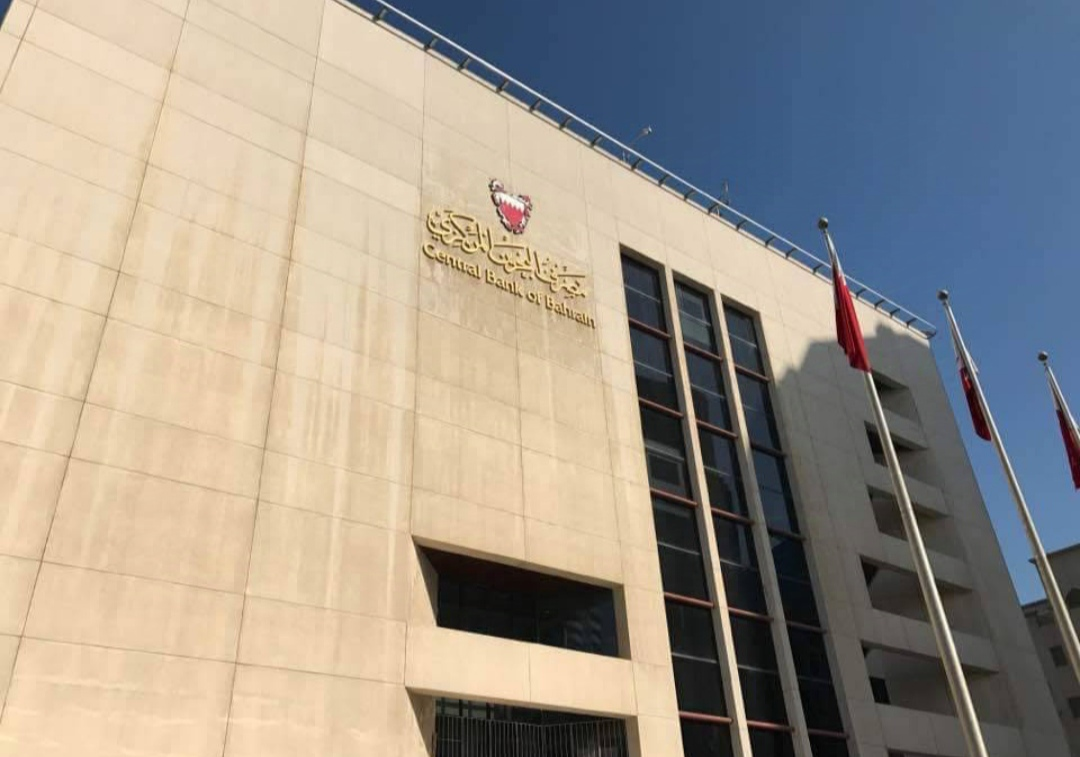
- Central bank of: Bahrain
- Headquarters: Manama, Bahrain
- Established: 6 September 2006; 19 years ago
- Ownership: 100% state ownership
- Key people: Khalid Humaidan, Governor
- Currency: Bahraini dinar BHD (ISO 4217)
- Reserves: $3.2 billion
- Preceded by: Bahrain Monetary Agency
- Website: www.cbb.gov.bh

The Central Bank of Bahrain (CBB) is the central bank of Bahrain. It is a public corporate entity that was established by the Central Bank of Bahrain and Financial Institutions Law 2006. on 6 September 2006.

Decree No. 64 of 2006 with respect to promulgating the Central Bank of Bahrain and Financial Institutions Law established the Central Bank of Bahrain in place of the Bahrain Monetary Agency. The Bank is located in the Diplomatic Area of Manama, in Bahrain.

Its responsibilities include, implement monetary policy, supervise and regulate the banking sector, acting as the government's fiscal agent, encouraging the growth of Bahrain as a major international financial centre, and to manage the foreign currency, cash and gold reserves of the Kingdom.

== History ==
It was established in 1973 as the Bahrain Monetary Agency, shortly after Bahrain gained its independence from the United Kingdom, replacing the Bahrain Currency Board that had been created in 1965. The bank also houses a coin and currency museum with collections dating back to 653 AD.

The Bank on April 29, 2022 announced new regulations containing rules regarding equity-based crowdfunding and financing-based crowdfunding and are covered under Crowdfunding Platform Operators Module (Module CFP). Module CFP will be found under CBB Rule book – Volume 5: Type 7 – Ancillary Service Providers.

The current Central Bank of Bahrain governor is Rasheed Al Maraj. In November 2014, he decided to further develop the kingdom's growing insurance sector. He acknowledged the necessity for the Central Bank to co-operate with the insurance market to support the insurance sector, also insisting on the insurance firms' obligations to fulfill their social responsibility. The Central Bank governor is the chairman of the board of directors of the Bahrain Bourse.

== Governors ==
- Abdullah Hassan Saif, 1979 – May 1999
- Abdullah bin Khalifa Al Khalifa, 1999–2002
- Ahmed bin Mohamed Al Khalifa, 2002 – January 2005
- Rasheed Mohammed Al Maraj, January 2005 – February 2024
- Khalid Humaidan, February 2024

== See also ==
- Bahraini dinar
- Economy of Bahrain
- List of banks in Bahrain
- List of banks in the Arab world
- List of central banks
- List of financial supervisory authorities by country
