= List of banks in Asia =

This is a list of banks in Asia (alphabetically)

== Afghanistan ==
=== Central Bank ===
- Da Afghanistan Bank

=== Commercial Bank ===
- Afghan United Bank
- Afghanistan International Bank (AIB)
- Bank Alfalah
- Aryanbank
- Azizi Bank
- Bakter Bank
- Bank-e-Millie Afghan
- Brak Afghanistan Bank
- First MicroFinance Bank
- Ghazanfar Bank
- HDFC Bank
- HBL Afghanistan
- Miawand Bank
- National Bank Of Afghanistan
- National Bank of Pakistan
- New Kabul Bank
- Pashtany Bank
- Standard Chartered Bank

== Bahrain ==
- Ahli United Bank
- Bank ABC
- Bahrain Islamic Bank
- Bank of Bahrain and Kuwait
- Bank Melli Iran
- Citibank
- Gulf International Bank
- HSBC Bank (Middle East)
- ICICI Bank
- National Bank of Bahrain
- Saderat bank of Iran
- Standard Chartered Bank
- State Bank of India

== Bangladesh ==
- Bangladesh Bank
- Bangladesh Krishi Bank
- Grameen Bank
- Sonali Bank
- Janata Bank
- Rupali Bank
- Bangladesh Development Bank Limited
- Islami Bank Bangladesh Limited
- Al Arafah Islami Bank Limited
- Prime Bank
- Premier Bank
- Commercial Bank of Ceylon
- Dutch Bangla Bank
- Exim Bank
- Eastern Bank Limited
- HSBC Bank
- Standard Chartered Bank
- Citibank N.A
- Bank Asia
- BRAC Bank
- Midland Bank
- Bank Al Falah Limited
- Trust Bank
- State Bank of India
- Woori India

== Cambodia ==
The Association of Banks in Cambodia (ABC) provides networking opportunities, social events, educational programs and industry updates for banking professionals in Cambodia.

=== Commercial Bank ===
- ACLEDA Bank
- Advanced Bank of Asia
- Agribank Cambodia
- ANZ Royal Bank
- Bangkok Bank PLC
- Bank for Investment and Development of Cambodia PLC
- Bank of China
- Bank of India
- Booyoung Khmer Bank
- Cambodia Asia Bank
- Cambodia Commercial Bank
- Cambodia Mekong Bank
- Cambodia Post Bank PLC
- Cambodian Public Bank
- Canadia Bank
- Cathay United Bank (Cambodia)
- CIMB Bank PLC
- First Commercial Bank
- Foreign Trade Bank of Cambodia
- Hong Leong Bank Berhad
- Industrial and Commercial Bank of China Limited
- Kookmin Bank Cambodia PLC
- Krung Thai Bank PLC
- Maruhan Japan Bank PLC
- Maybank
- MB Bank PLC
- Mega International Commercial Bank Co., Ltd
- Phillip Bank PLC
- Phnom Penh Commercial Bank
- Prasac Microfinance Institution
- RHB Indochina Bank Limited
- Sacombank (Cambodia) PLC
- Saigon Hanoi Commercial Joint Stock Bank
- Shinhan Khmer Band
- Taiwan Cooperative Bank (TCB)
- The Shanghai Commercial & Savings Band, Ltd
- Union Commercial Bank
- Vattanac Bank

=== Specialized Bank ===
- ANCO Specialized Bank
- Angkor Capital Specialized Bank
- Cam Capital Specialized Bank PLC
- CAMKO Specialized Bank
- Chief (Cambodia) Specialized Bank PLC
- First Investment Specialized Bank
- Oxley Worldbridge Specialized Bank PLC
- PHSME Specialized Bank
- The Rural Development Bank
- Tomato Specialized Bank
- Wing (Cambodia) Limited Specialized Bank

== China (PRC) ==
=== Central bank ===
- People's Bank of China

=== Major banks ===
The Big four banks of China:

- Agricultural Bank of China (No.2)
- Bank of China (No.3)
- China Construction Bank (No.4)
- Industrial and Commercial Bank of China (No.1)

=== Major city commercial banks ===
- Bank of Communications
- China Bohai Bank
- China CITIC Bank
- China Everbright Bank
- China Merchants Bank
- China Minsheng Bank
- Guangdong Development Bank
- Huaxia Bank
- Industrial Bank
- Ping An Bank
- Shanghai Pudong Development Bank

=== Local banks ===
- Anshan City Commercial Bank
- Bank of Jiujiang
- Bank of Beijing
- Bank of Dalian
- Bank of Guangzhou
- Bank of Guiyang
- Bank of Hangzhou
- Bank of Hankou
- Bank of Hebei
- Bank of Hubei
- Bank of Jilin (in Changchun)
- Bank of Nanjing
- Bank of Quanzhou
- Bank of Shanghai
- Baoji City Commercial Bank
- Baotou City Commercial Bank
- Changsha City Commercial Bank
- Changzhou City Commercial Bank
- Chengdu City Commercial Bank
- Chongqing City Commercial Bank
- Commercial Bank of Zhengzhou
- Dandong City Commercial Bank
- Daqing City Commercial Bank
- Datong City Commercial Bank
- Deyang City Commercial Bank
- Dongguan City Commercial Bank
- Fushun City Commercial Bank
- Fuxin City Commercial Bank
- Huludao City Commercial Bank
- Fuzhou City Commercial Bank
- Ganzhou City Commercial Bank
- Guangdong Nan Yue Bank
- Guilin City Commercial Bank
- Harbin Bank
- Hengyang City Commercial Bank
- Hohhot City Commercial Bank
- Huai’an City Commercial Bank
- Huzhou City Commercial Bank
- Ji’nan City Commercial Bank
- Jiaozuo City Commercial Bank
- Jiaxing City Commercial Bank
- Jilin City Commercial Bank - merged in 2007 to Bank of Jilin
- Jinhua City Commercial Bank
- Jinzhou City Commercial Bank
- Jiujiang City Commercial Bank
- Kaifeng City Commercial Bank
- Kunming City Commercial Bank
- Langfang City Commercial Bank
- Lanzhou City Commercial Bank
- Leshan City Commercial Bank
- Lianyungang City Commercial Bank
- Liaoyang City Commercial Bank
- Linyi City Commercial Bank
- Liuzhou City Commercial Bank
- Luoyang City Commercial Bank
- Luzhou City Commercial Bank
- Mianyang City Commercial Bank
- Nanchang City Commercial Bank
- Nanchong City Commercial Bank
- Nanjing City Commercial Bank
- Nantong City Commercial Bank
- Nanyang City Commercial Bank
- Ningbo City Commercial Bank
- Panzhihua City Commercial Bank
- Qingdao City Commercial Bank
- Qiqihr City Commercial Bank
- Rizhao City Commercial Bank
- Shaoxing City Commercial Bank
- Shengjing Bank (in Shenyang)
- Suzhou City Commercial Bank
- Taiyuan City Commercial Bank
- Taizhou Commercial Bank
- Tianjin City Commercial Bank
- Wanzhou City Commercial Bank
- Weifang City Commercial Bank
- Weihai City commercial Bank
- Wenzhou City Commercial Bank
- Wuxi City Commercial Bank
- Yancheng City Commercial Bank
- Yangzhou City Commercial Bank
- Yantai City Commercial Bank
- Yichuan City Commercial Bank
- Yingkou City Commercial Bank
- Xi’an City Commercial Bank
- Xi'An Commercial Bank
- Xiamen Bank
- Xiangtan City Commercial Bank
- Xianyang City Commercial Bank
- Xining City Commercial Bank
- Xinxiang City Commercial Bank
- Xuzhou City Commercial Bank
- Yueyang City Commercial Bank
- Zhejiang Tailong Commercial Bank
- Zhunyi City Commercial Bank
- Zhuhai CRC Bank
- Zhenjiang City Commercial Bank
- Zibo City Commercial Bank
- Zigong City Commercial Bank
- Zhuzhou City Commercial Bank

=== Defunct banks ===
- Hainan Development Bank
- Shenzhen Development Bank

=== Institutional banks ===
- Agricultural Development Bank of China
- China Development Bank
- The Export-Import Bank of China (China Exim Bank)

=== Hong Kong SAR ===
==== Major banks ====
- Bank of China (Hong Kong)
- Bank of East Asia
- Hang Seng Bank
- Hong Kong and Shanghai Banking Corporation
- Standard Chartered Hong Kong

==== Defunct or merged banks ====
- Bank of Canton
- First Pacific Bank
- Fortis Bank Asia HK
- Generale Belgian Bank
- Hong Nin Savings Bank
- Kwong On Bank
- The National Commercial Bank Limited
- Wing On Bank

== India ==
=== Central bank ===
- Reserve Bank of India

=== Public Sector banks ===
- Bank of Baroda
- Bank of India
- Bank of Maharashtra
- Canara Bank
- Central Bank of India
- Indian Bank
- Indian Overseas Bank
- Punjab & Sind Bank
- Punjab National Bank
- State Bank of India
- UCO Bank
- Union Bank of India

=== Old private sector banks ===
- CSB Bank
- City Union Bank
- Development Credit Bank
- Dhanlaxmi Bank
- Federal Bank
- Jammu & Kashmir Bank
- Karur Vysya Bank
- Nainital Bank
- Saraswat Bank
- South Indian Bank
- Tamilnad Mercantile Bank

=== New private sector banks ===
- Axis Bank (Formerly UTI Bank)
- Bandhan Bank
- HDFC Bank
- ICICI Bank
- IDBI Bank
- IDFC FIRST Bank
- IndusInd Bank
- Karnataka Bank
- Kotak Mahindra Bank
- Yes Bank
- RBL Bank

=== Foreign banks operating in India ===
- ABN AMRO
- First Abu Dhabi Bank
- Abu Dhabi Commercial Bank
- American Express Bank
- Antwerp Diamond Bank
- Arab Bangladesh Bank
- Bank of America
- Bank of Bahrain and Kuwait
- Bank of Ceylon
- Bank Internasional Indonesia
- Bank of Tokyo Mitsubishi UFJ
- Barclays
- BNP Paribas
- Calyon Bank
- Chinatrust Commercial Bank
- Citibank
- DBS Bank
- Deutsche Bank
- HSBC
- ING
- JPMorgan Chase
- Krung Thai Bank
- Mashreq Bank
- Mizuho Corporate Bank
- Oman International Bank
- Royal Bank of Scotland
- Scotiabank
- Shinhan Bank
- Société Générale
- Sonali Bank
- Standard Chartered Bank
- State Bank of Mauritius
- UBS
- VTB

=== Cooperative banks ===
- Cosmos Bank
- Rupee Cooperative Bank Ltd.
- Shamrao Vithal Co-operative Bank Ltd
- Ahmadabad Urdan Cooperation Bank
- Mumbai City Cooperation Bank
- NCR Bank
- City Urban Cooperation Bank
- Aawadha Bank
- Kasi Gomati Rural Bank
- BOB Estern Bank
- BOB Wastern Bank
- Zila Cooperation Bank Faizabad UP
- Zila Cooperation Bank Gorakhapur UP
- Zila Cooperation Bank Kanpur UP
- Zila Cooperation Bank Varanasi UP
- Zila Cooperation Bank Allhabad UP
- Zila Cooperation Bank Lucknow UP
- Zila Cooperation Bank Jhansi UP
- Zila Cooperation Bank Meerut UP
- Zila Cooperation Bank Gaziyabad UP
- Zila Cooperation Bank Aligarh UP
- Zila Cooperation Bank Bhopal MP
- Zila Cooperation Bank Indore
- Zila Cooperation Bank Rewa
- Zila Cooperation Bank Jabalpur
- Zila Cooperation Bank Raipur
- Zila Cooperation Bank Ayodhya
- Zila Cooperation Bank Kota
- Zila Cooperation Bank Shivapuri
- Zila Cooperation Bank Patna
- Zila Cooperation Bank Bagosare
- Zila Cooperation Bank Baxer
- Zila Cooperation Bank Jaipur
- Zila Cooperation Bank Uadaypur
- Zila Cooperation Bank Ajmer
- Zila Cooperation Bank Bilasapur
- Zila Cooperation Bank Jammu
- Zila Cooperation Bank Shri Nagar
- Zila Cooperation Bank Silmla
- Zila Cooperation Bank Kulu
- Zila Cooperation Bank Dehradun
- Zila Cooperation Bank Nanitaal
- Zila Cooperation Bank Chandigarh
- Zila Cooperation Bank Gurugram
- Zila Cooperation Bank Amritsar
- Zila Cooperation Bank Ludhiana
- Zila Cooperation Bank Bhatinda
- Zila Cooperation Bank Ladaka
- Zila Cooperation Bank Leh
- Zila Cooperation Bank Guwahati
- Zila Cooperation Bank Itanagar
- Zila Cooperation Bank Gangtok
- Zila Cooperation Bank Kohima
- Zila Cooperation Bank Kolkata
- Zila Cooperation Bank Siliguri
- Zila Cooperation Bank Bhuvaneshvar
- Zila Cooperation Bank Cutak
- Zila Cooperation Bank Orrisa
- Zila Cooperation Bank Vizag
- Zila Cooperation Bank Vishakhapattanam
- Zila Cooperation Bank Vijaywada
- Zila Cooperation Bank Shriciti
- Zila Cooperation Bank Amarvati
- Zila Cooperation Bank Haidarabad
- Zila Cooperation Bank Kinnaur
- Zila Cooperation Bank Oti
- Zila Cooperation Bank Tirupati
- Zila Cooperation Bank Auragabad
- Zila Cooperation Bank Nagpur
- Zila Cooperation Bank Pune
- Zila Cooperation Bank Nasik
- Zila Cooperation Bank Mumbai Navi
- Zila Cooperation Bank Thane
- Zila Cooperation Bank Solapur
- Zila Cooperation Bank Yovtmal
- Zila Cooperation Bank Bangalore
- Zila Cooperation Bank Rameshwarerm
- Zila Cooperation Bank Machlipattm
- Zila Cooperation Bank Padji
- Zila Cooperation Bank Vocodigma
- Zila Cooperation Bank Kochin
- Zila Cooperation Bank Kanyakumari
- Zila Cooperation Bank Shivakashi
- Zila Cooperation Bank Coimbatore
- Zila Cooperation Bank Madurai
- Zila Cooperation Bank Tiruchirappalli
- Zila Cooperation Bank Duo
- Zila Cooperation Bank Port Blear
- Zila Cooperation Bank Indra Port
- Zila Cooperation Bank Karwati
- Zila Cooperation Bank Nagapattinam

=== Rural Bank ===
- UP East Rural Bank
- UP West Rural Bank
- Kasi Gomati Rural Bank
- Hariyana Rural Bank
- Uttarakhand Rural Bank
- PNB Rural Bank
- J&K Rural Bank
- Himachal Pradesh Rural Bank
- Allhabad Rural Bihar Bank
- Madhya Bharat Rural Bank
- Jharkhand Rural Bank
- Central Bangla Rural Bank
- Assemia HDFC Rural Bank
- ICICI Rajasthan Rural Bank
- Raipur Rural Bank Chhattisgarh
- Orrisa Rural Bank
- Coastal Rural Bank Andhra
- Island Axix Rural Bank
- Tripur Rural Bank
- SBI North East Rural Bank
- Arrunprabha Rural Bank
- Dena Rural Bank Chandigarh
- South Bank Rural Tamilanadu
- Maratratha Rural Bank
- Goa Rural Bank

=== Payment Bank ===
- BSNL Payment Bank
- MTNL Payment Bank
- Aditya Birla Nuvo
- M Commerce Services
- Airtel Bank
- Vodafone M Paisa
- Aircel Payment Service
- Jio Payment Getaway
- Paytm Bank
- Tata Payment Service

=== Merged Bank ===
- Arbuthnot & Co
- State Bank of Indore (Merged into State Bank of India)
- State Bank of Saurashtra (Merged into State Bank of India)
- Bank of Bombay (now part of the State Bank of India)
- Bank of Calcutta (now part of the State Bank of India)
- Bank of Chettinad
- Bank of Madras (now part of the State Bank of India)
- Bank of Madura (now part of ICICI Bank)
- Centurion Bank of Punjab (now part of HDFC Bank)
- Global Trust Bank (now part of Oriental Bank of Commerce)
- Lord Krishna Bank (now part of Centurion Bank of Punjab)

== Indonesia ==
=== Central bank ===
- Bank Indonesia

=== State banks ===
- Bank Mandiri
- Bank Negara Indonesia
- Bank Rakyat Indonesia
- Bank Tabungan Negara

=== Public banks ===
- Bank Artha Graha Internasional
- Bank BRI Agro Niaga
- Bank Bukopin
- Bank Bumi Arta
- Bank Bumiputera Indonesia
- Bank Capital Indonesia
- Bank Central Asia
- Bank CIMB Niaga
- Bank Danamon
- Bank Eksekutif International
- Bank Himpunan Saudara 1906
- Bank Maybank Indonesia
- Bank Kesawan
- Bank Mayapada
- Bank Mega
- Bank Multicor
- Bank Mutiara
- Bank OCBC NISP
- Bank Pan Indonesia
- Bank Permata
- Bank Sinarmas
- Bank UOB Buana
- Bank Victoria International

=== Private banks ===
- Bank Agroniaga
- Bank Akita
- Bank Alfindo
- Bank Anglomas Internasional (Merger pending with Wishart)
- Bank Antardaerah
- Bank Jago (Formerly Bank Artos Indonesia)
- Bank Bintang Manunggal
- Bank Bisnis Internasional
- Bank Centratama Nasional
- Bank CIC
- Bank Dipo International
- Bank Ekonomi Raharja
- Bank Fama Internasional
- Bank Ganesha
- Bank Harda Internasional
- Bank Harfa (Merger pending with Bank Panin)
- Bank Harmoni International (Merger pending with Bank Index Selindo)
- Bank IFI
- Bank Ina Perdana
- Bank Index Selindo (Merger pending with Bank Harmoni International)
- Bank Jasa Arta
- Bank Jasa Jakarta
- Bank Kesejahteraan Ekonomi
- Bank Liman International
- Bank Maspion
- Bank Mayora
- Bank Mestika Dharma
- Bank Metro Express
- Bank Mitraniaga
- Bank Multi Arta Sentosa
- Bank Persyarikatan Indonesia
- Bank Prima Master
- Bank Purba Danarta
- Bank Royal Indonesia
- Bank Sinar Harapan Bali (Merger pending with Bank Mandiri)
- Bank Sri Partha (Merger pending with Mercy Corp.)
- Bank Swaguna
- Bank Tabungan Pensiunan Nasional
- Bank UIB
- Bank Yudha Bhakti

=== Defunct banks ===
- Bank Arta Niaga Kencana (Merged with Commonwealth Bank of Australia)
- Bank Haga (Merged with Rabobank)
- Bank Hagakita (Merged with Rabobank)
- Bank Halim Indonesia (Merged with ICBC)
- Bank Indomonex (Acquired by Bank of India and State Bank of India)
- Bank Nusantara Parahyangan (Acquired by consortium of Acom and Bank of Tokyo Mitsubishi UFJ)
- Bank Swadesi (Acquired by Bank of India and State Bank of India)
- Bank Windu Kentjana (Merged with Bank Multicor)

=== Islamic banks ===
- Bank Muamalat Indonesia
- Bank Syariah Indonesia
- Bank Syariah Mega Indonesia

=== Regional development banks ===
- Bank DKI
- Bank Kalteng
- Bank Lampung
- Bank Nagari
- Bank Aceh Syariah
- Bank BPD Bali
- Bank Bengkulu
- Bank BPD DIY
- Bank Jambi
- Bank BJB
- Bank Jateng
- Bank Jatim
- Bank Kalbar
- Bank Kalsel
- Bank Kaltimtara
- Bank Maluku Malut
- Bank NTB Syariah
- Bank NTT
- Bank Papua
- Bank Riau Kepri
- Bank Sulselbar
- Bank Sulteng
- Bank Sultra
- Bank Sulutgo
- Bank Sumselbabel
- Bank Sumut

== Iran ==
=== Central bank ===
- Central Bank of Iran

=== Government-owned banks ===
==== Commercial banks ====
- Bank Melli Iran
- Bank Sepah
- Post Bank of Iran

==== Specialised banks ====
- Bank of Industry and Mine
- Bank Maskan
- Export Development Bank of Iran
- Qarz Al-Hasaneh Mehr Iran Bank
- Bank Keshavarzi Iran
- Qarz Al-Hasaneh Resalat Bank
- Tose'e Ta'avon Bank

=== Non-government-owned banks ===
- Bank Mellat
- Bank Pasargad
- Bank Saderat Iran
- Bank Shahr
- Bank Day
- EN Bank
- Iran Zamin Bank
- Karafarin Bank
- Parsian Bank
- Refah Bank
- Saman Bank
- Sarmayeh Bank
- Sina Bank
- Tejarat Bank
- Tourism Bank
- Middle East Bank

=== Foreign banks ===
- BankMuscat Bank Muscat SAOG (Oman)
- Erste Bank (Austria)
- Europäisch-Iranische Handelsbank (aka The Iran-Europe Commercial Bank) (Germany)
- Future Bank (Bahrain)
- Islamic Development Cooperation and Regional Investment Bank (Iraq)
- Raiffeisen Bank International (Austria)
- Standard Chartered^{†} (UK)
- UCO Bank Ltd (India)
- Woori Bank (South Korea)

^{†}Standard Chartered said it closed down all its Iranian branches in the first quarter of 2012.

=== Binational banks ===
- Iran-Venezuela Bi-National Bank

=== Financial and credit institutions ===
- Askariye Finance and Credit Institution
- Credit Institution for Development
- Ghavamin Finance and Credit Institution
- Mehr Finance and Credit Institution
- Pishgaman Finance and Credit Institution Iran (Āti)
- Salehin Finance and Credit Institution
- Samen Alaemeh Credit Cooperative

=== Investment institutions ===
- AminIB

== Iraq ==
=== Central bank ===
- Central Bank of Iraq

=== Major banks ===
- Rafidain Bank
- Rasheed Bank

== Israel ==
=== Central bank ===
- Bank of Israel

=== Major banks ===
- Bank Hapoalim
- Bank Leumi
- Bank Mizrahi-Tefahot
- Bank Otsar Ha-Hayal
- First International Bank of Israel
- Israel Discount Bank
- Union Bank of Israel

== Japan ==
=== Central bank ===
- Bank of Japan

=== Government Institutions ===
- Development Bank of Japan
- Japan Bank for International Cooperation
- Japan Finance Corporation
- Japan Housing Finance Agency
- Okinawa Development Finance Corporation
- Shoko Chukin Bank

=== Major banking groups ===
- Aozora Bank
- Mitsubishi UFJ Financial Group
  - Mitsubishi Tokyo Financial Group (merged with UFJ Holdings to form Mitsubishi UFJ Financial Group)
  - UFJ Holdings (merged with Mitsubishi Tokyo Financial Group to form Mitsubishi UFJ Financial Group)
- Mitsui Trust Holdings
- Mizuho Financial Group
- Resona Holdings
- SBI Shinsei Bank
- Sumitomo Mitsui Banking Corporation
- Sumitomo Trust and Banking

=== Regional banks ===
- The 77 Bank
- Akita Bank
- Aomori Bank
- Bank of Iwate
- Bank of Kyoto
- Chiba Kōgyō Bank
- Hokkaido Bank
- Hokkoku Bank
- Hokuriku Bank
- Hokuto Bank
- Hokuyo Bank
- Joyo Bank
- Kanto Tsukuba Bank
- Michinoku Bank
- Sapporo Bank
- Shonai Bank
- Toho Bank
- Tohoku Bank
- Yamagata Bank
- Yamanashi Chuo Bank

=== Other banks ===
- Seven Bank
- Sony Bank

== Jordan ==
- Ahli Commercial Bank (Jordan National Bank)
- Ahli Corporate Bank
- Arab Bank
- Bank ABC
- Arab Finance House
- Arab Finance Investment House
- Arab Investment Bank
- Bank Audi
- Bank of Jordan
- BLOM Bank
- Capital Bank (ex-Export and Finance Bank)
- Cairo Amman Bank
- Central Bank of Jordan
- Citibank
- Citigroup
- Egyptian Arab Land Bank
- German Development Bank
- HSBC
- Industrial Development Bank
- Islamic International Arab Bank
- Jordan Commercial Bank
- Jordan Gulf Bank
- Jordan Investment and Finance Bank
- Jordan Islamic Bank for Finance and Investment
- Jordan Kuwait Bank
- JordInvest (Jordan Investment Trust)
- Middle East for Investment
- National Bank of Kuwait
- Rafidain Bank
- Société Générale
- Standard Chartered Bank
- The Housing Bank of Trade and Finance
- The Islamic Bank
- Union Bank for Savings and Investments

== Korea (North) ==
=== Central bank ===
- Central Bank of the Democratic People's Republic of Korea

=== Local banks ===
- Chinmyong Joint Bank(진명합영은행)
- Civilian Cooperation Bank(민사협조은행)
- Daedong Credit Bank
- Daesong Bank
- Foreign Trade Bank of the Democratic People's Republic of Korea
- Kumgang Bank(금강은행)

=== Banks overseas ===
- Golden Star Bank (closed in June 2004)
- Joson Trade Bank
- Danchon Bank (formerly called Chang-Kwang Credit Bank)
- Koryo Bank

== Korea (South) ==
=== Central bank ===
- Bank of Korea

=== Specialized bank ===
- Export-Import Bank of Korea
- Industrial Bank of Korea
- Korea Development Bank
- Nonghyup Bank
- Suhyup Bank

=== Commercial bank ===
==== Nationwide ====
- Citibank Korea
- Hana Bank
- Kookmin Bank
- Shinhan Bank
- Standard Chartered Korea
- Woori Bank
- Busan Bank
- Daegu Bank

==== Local ====
- Kwangju Bank
- Kyongnam Bank
- Jeonbuk Bank
- Jeju Bank

==== Internet-only ====
- K Bank
- KakaoBank
- Toss Bank

== Kuwait ==
- Al-Ahli Bank of Kuwait
- Ahli United Bank
- Bank of Bahrain and Kuwait
- BNP Paribas Kuwait
- Boubyan Bank
- Burgan Bank
- Central Bank of Kuwait
- Citibank Kuwait
- Commercial Bank of Kuwait
- Credit & Saving Bank
- Gulf Bank of Kuwait
- HSBC Kuwait
- HDFC BANK
- Industrial Bank of Kuwait
- Kuwait Finance House
- Kuwait International Bank
- National Bank of Kuwait
- United Gulf Bank

== Lebanon ==
=== Central bank ===
- Banque du Liban

=== Major banks ===
- Audi Saradar Bank S.A.L
- Bank Med S.A.L
- Bank of Beirut S.A.L.
- BLOM Bank S.A.L.
- Byblos Bank S.A.L.
- Citibank, N.A.
- Crédit Libanais S.A.L.
- Federal Bank of Lebanon S.A.L.
- Fransabank S.A.L.

=== Other banks ===
- Al-Mawarid Bank S.A.L.
- Arab Investment Bank S.A.L.
- B.L.C. Bank S.A.L.
- Bank Al Madina S.A.L.
- Banque BEMO S.A.L.
- Banque de la Bekaa S.A.L.
- Banque de l'Habitat S.A.L.
- Banque de l'Industrie Et Du Travail S.A.L.
- Banque Lati S.A.L.
- Banque Misr Liban S.A.L.
- BBAC S.A.L.
- BSL BANK S.A.L.
- Creditbank S.A.L.
- FFA Private Bank
- Finance Bank S.A.L.
- First National Bank S.A.L.
- MEAB S.A.L.
- Méditerranée Investment Bank S.A.L.
- Near East Commercial Bank S.A.L.
- Société Générale de Banque au Liban S.A.L.

=== Foreign banks ===
- Arab Finance House S.A.L.
- Banca Di Roma S.P.A
- Bank of Kuwait And The Arab World S.A.L.
- Banque Libano-Française S.A.L.
- Banque Nationale de Paris "Intercontinentale"
- HSBC Bank Middle East Limited
- Intercontinental Bank of Lebanon S.A.L.
- Lebanon & Gulf Bank S.A.L.
- Lebanese Canadian Bank S.A.L.
- Lebanese Islamic Bank S.A.L.
- Lebanese Swiss Bank S.A.L.
- National Bank of Kuwait (Lebanon) S.A.L.
- Saderat Bank of Iran
- Standard Chartered Bank S.A.L.
- Syrian Lebanese Commercial Bank S.A.L.

== Maldives ==
- Bank of Ceylon
- Bank of Maldives
- Commercial Bank of Maldives
- State Bank of India

== Mongolia ==
=== Central bank ===
- Bank of Mongolia

=== State-owned banks ===
- Development Bank of Mongolia
- State Bank

=== Commercial banks ===
- Trade and Development Bank of Mongolia
- Golomt Bank
- XacBank
- Khan Bank
- Capitron Bank
- National Investment Bank of Mongolia
- Chinggis Khaan Bank
- Credit Bank
- Trans Bank
- Arig Bank
- Bogd Bank
- M bank

== Myanmar ==
=== Central Bank ===
- Central Bank of Myanmar

=== Government-Operated Banks ===
1. Myanma Agricultural Development Bank
2. Myanma Economic Bank
3. Myanma Foreign Trade Bank
4. Myanma Investment and Commercial Bank

=== Semi-government banks ===
1. Construction, Housing and Infrastructure Development Bank
2. Innwa Bank
3. Mineral Development Bank
4. Myawaddy Bank
5. Nay Pyi Taw Development Bank
6. Rural Development Bank
7. Yadanabon Bank
8. Yangon City Bank

=== Commercial Banks ===
1. AGD Bank
2. Asia-Yangon Bank
3. AYA Bank
4. A Bank
5. Co-operative Bank (CB Bank)
6. Myanmar Citizens Bank
7. Glory Farmer Development Bank (G Bank)
8. KBZ Bank
9. MAB Bank
10. Myanmar Microfinance Bank
11. Myanmar Oriental Bank
12. Myanma Tourism Bank
13. Shwe Rural and Urban Development Bank (Shwe Bank)
14. Tun Commercial Bank (formerly Tun Foundation Bank)
15. UAB Bank
16. Yoma Bank
17. First Private Bank
18. Small & Medium Enterprises Development Bank
19. Global Treasure Bank (formerly Myanmar Livestock and Fisheries Development Bank)

=== Foreign banks ===
(notified by Central Bank of Myanmar)

1. State Bank of India
2. MUFG Bank
3. Sumitomo Mitsui Banking Corporation
4. OCBC Bank
5. United Overseas Bank
6. Bangkok Bank
7. Industrial and Commercial Bank of China
8. Maybank
9. Mizuho Bank
10. Australia and New Zealand Banking Group
11. Bank for Investment and Development of Vietnam (BIDV)
12. Shinhan Bank
13. E.SUN Commercial Bank

== Nepal ==
=== Central Bank ===
- Nepal Rastra Bank

=== Foreign Banks ===
- Nepal SBI Bank
- Standard Chartered Nepal

=== Government-Operated Banks ===
- Agriculture Development Bank
- Nepal Bank
- Rastriya Banijya Bank

=== Semi-government Banks ===
- Nepal Infrastructure Bank

=== Commercial Banks ===
- Citizens Bank International
- Everest Bank
- Global IME Bank
- Himalayan Bank
- Kumari Bank
- Laxmi Bank
- Machhapuchchhre Bank
- Nabil Bank
- Nepal Investment Bank
- NIC Asia Bank
- NMB Bank
- Prabhu Bank
- Prime Commercial Bank
- Sanima Bank
- Siddhartha Bank

=== Development Banks ===
- Corporate Development Bank
- Excel Development Bank
- Garima Bikas Bank
- Green Development Bank
- Jyoti Bikas Bank
- Kamana Sewa Bikas Bank
- Karnali Development Bank
- Lumbini Bikas Bank
- Mahalaxmi Development Bank
- Miteri Development Bank
- Muktinath Bikas Bank
- Narayani Development Bank
- Salapa Bikas Bank
- Saptakoshi Development Bank
- Sangrila Development Bank
- Shine Resunga Development Bank
- Sindhu Bikas Bank

=== Finance Institutions ===
- Best Finance
- Capital Merchant Banking & Finance
- Central Finance
- Goodwill Finance
- Gorkhas Finance
- Guheshwori Merchant Banking & Finance
- ICFC Finance
- Janaki Finance Company
- Manjushree Finance
- Multipurpose Finance Company
- Nepal Finance
- Nepal Share Markets and Finance
- Pokhara Finance
- Progressive Finance
- Reliance Finance
- Samridhhi Finance Company
- Shree Investment & Finance Company

== Oman ==
=== Central bank ===
- Central Bank of Oman

=== Local banks ===
- Bank Muscat
- Oman Arab Bank
- National Bank of Oman
- Sohar International Bank
- Bank Dhofar
- Ahli Bank (Oman)

=== Foreign banks ===
- Standard Chartered Bank
- HSBC Middle East
- Citibank
- Bank of Baroda
- State Bank of India
- Habib Bank Limited

=== Digital banks ===
- Oman Arab Bank Digital Banking Unit
- Bank Muscat Mobile Banking Services

== Pakistan ==
=== Central bank ===
- State Bank of Pakistan

=== Nationalized scheduled banks ===
- Bank of Punjab
- First Women Bank
- National Bank of Pakistan
- Sindh Bank

=== Specialized banks ===
- Industrial Development Bank
- Punjab Provincial Cooperative Bank
- SME Bank
- Zarai Taraqiati Bank

=== Private scheduled banks ===
- Allied Bank of Pakistan
- Askari Bank
- Bank AL Habib
- Bank Alfalah
- Bank of Punjab
- Barclays Bank
- Faysal Bank
- Habib Metropolitan Bank
- Habib Bank
- HSBC
- JS Bank
- KASB Bank
- MCB Bank Limited (formerly Muslim Commercial Bank)
- MyBank Limited, acquired by and merged with Summit Bank
- NIB Bank
- Samba Bank
- Silk Bank formerly Saudi Pak Non-Commercial Bank
- Soneri Bank
- Summit Bank
- United Bank

=== Development financial institutions ===
- House Building Finance Corporation
- Investment Corporation of Pakistan
- Pak Kuwait Investment Company Limited
- Pak Libya Holding Company Limited
- Pak-Oman Investment Company Limited
- Saudi Pak Industrial and Agricultural Investment Company (Pvt) Limited

=== Investment banks ===
- Al-Towfeek Investment Bank Limited
- Alzamin Investment Bank
- Asset Investment Bank Limited
- Escorts Investment Bank Limited
- Fidelity Investment Bank Limited
- IGI Investment Bank Limited
- Orix Investment Bank (Pakistan) Limited
- Trust Investment Bank Limited

=== Discount and guarantee houses ===
- First Credit & Discount Corp Limited
- National Discounting Services Limited
- Prudential Discount & Guarantee House Limited
- Speedway Fordmetall (Pakistan) Limited

=== Housing finance companies ===
- Citibank Housing Finance Company Limited
- House Building Finance Corporation
- International Housing Finance Limited

=== Venture capital companies ===
- Pakistan Venture Capital Limited
- Pakistan Emerging Ventures Limited

=== Micro finance banks ===
- The First Micro Finance Bank Limited
- Karakuram Bank
- Kashf Foundation Limited
- Khushhali Bank
- Network Micro Finance Bank
- Pak Oman Micro Finance Bank
- Rozgar Micro Finance Bank
- Tameer Microfinance Bank Limited

=== Islamic banks ===
- AlBaraka Bank
- BankIslami Pakistan Limited
- Dawood Islamic Bank Limited (formerly First Dawood Islamic Bank Limited)
- Dubai Islamic Bank Pakistan Limited
- Meezan Bank

== Philippines ==
=== Central bank ===
- Bangko Sentral ng Pilipinas

=== Universal banks ===
- Asia United Bank
- Banco de Oro Universal Bank
- Bank of the Philippine Islands
- Chinabank
- East West Unibank
- Metropolitan Bank and Trust Company
- Philippine National Bank
- Rizal Commercial Banking Corporation
- Security Bank
- Union Bank of the Philippines
- United Coconut Planters Bank

=== Commercial banks ===
- Bank of Commerce
- International Exchange Bank
- Philippine Bank of Communications
- Philippine Veterans Bank
- Philtrust Bank
- Robinsons Bank

=== Thrift banks ===
- Allied Savings Bank
- BPI Family Savings Bank (A subsidiary of BPI)
- Centennial Savings Bank
- China Bank Savings (A subsidiary of Chinabank)
- City Savings Bank (A subsidiary of Unionbank)
- Citystate Savings Bank
- Luzon Development Bank
- Orion Bank (new name since 2005 Tongyang Bank)
- Philippine Savings Bank (A subsidiary of Metrobank)
- Planters Development Bank (A subsidiary of Chinabank)
- Premiere Development Bank
- Producers Savings Banking Corporation
- RCBC Savings Bank (A subsidiary of RCBC)
- Real Bank (Acquired by BDO Unibank)
- Bank of Makati

=== Rural banks ===
- Banco San Juan (Acquired by BDO Unibank)
- Bank of Florida
- EastWest Rural Bank, Inc. (A subsidiary of East West Unibank)
- New Rural Bank of Binalbagan, Inc.
- One Network Bank (Acquired by BDO Unibank)
- Rural Bank of Alaminos (Laguna)
- Rural Bank of Bauang, Inc.
- Rural Bank of Dolores
- Rural Bank of San Pablo
- Rural Bank of Tanay
- Tiaong Rural Bank, Inc.

=== Government banks ===
- Bangko Sentral ng Pilipinas (Central bank)
- Development Bank of the Philippines
- Land Bank of the Philippines
- The Overseas Filipino Bank (OFB) (Subsidiary of Land Bank of the Philippines)
- Al-Amanah Islamic Investment Bank of the Philippines (Subsidiary of Development Bank of the Philippines)

=== Islamic banks ===
- Al-Amanah Islamic Investment Bank of the Philippines

=== Special banks ===
- Asian Development Bank

=== Foreign banks ===
- ABN AMRO
- American Express
- Bank of America
- Bank of China
- Chinatrust Bank
- Citibank
- DBS Bank
- HSBC
- Keppel Bank
- Maybank
- Standard Chartered Bank
- United Overseas Bank
- CIMB

=== Defunct or merged banks ===
- Allied Bank (merge with PNB)
- Banco Filipino
- Equitable PCI Bank (acquired by Banco de Oro Universal Bank)
- Export and Industry Bank
- Far East Bank (acquired by Bank of the Philippine Islands)
- Insular Savings Bank (acquired by Citibank, renamed Citibank Savings)
- International Exchange Bank (merged with Union Bank of the Philippines)
- LBC Bank
- Monte de Piedad Savings Bank (acquired by Keppel Bank)
- Philippine Commercial International Bank (merged with Equitable Bank, renamed Equitable PCI Bank)
- Prudential Bank (acquired by Bank of the Philippine Islands)
- Urban Bank (closed then merged with Export and Industry Bank)
- Keppel Bank (acquired by GE Money, renamed GE Money Savings Bank)
- Solidbank (acquired by Metropolitan Bank and Trust Company)
- Standard Chartered Bank (Philippines) (acquired by EastWest Bank)

== Qatar ==
- Ahli Bank
- Al khalij Commercial Bank (KCBC)
- Arab Bank
- Bank Saderat Iran
- Doha Bank
- HSBC
- International Bank of Qatar
- Mashreq Bank
- Masraf Al Rayan
- BNP Paribas
- Qatar Central Bank
- Qatar Development Bank
- Qatar International Islamic Bank
- Qatar Islamic Bank
- Qatar National Bank
- Standard Chartered Bank
- State Bank of India
- The Commercial Bank of Qatar
- United Bank Limited

== Saudi Arabia ==
=== Central bank ===
- Saudi Central Bank (formerly Saudi Arabian Monetary Authority - SAMA)

=== Local banks ===
- Saudi National Bank
- Al Rajhi Bank
- Riyad Bank
- Saudi Awwal Bank (SAB) (Formed by the merger of Saudi British Bank (SABB) and Awwal Bank)
- Arab National Bank
- The Saudi Investment Bank
- Alinma Bank
- Bank Albilad
- Bank Aljazira
- Banque Saudi Fransi
- Gulf International Bank (Saudi Arabia)

=== Foreign banks ===
- Standard Chartered Bank
- J.P. Morgan Chase
- BNP Paribas
- Deutsche Bank
- Bank of China
- Industrial and Commercial Bank of China
- Emirates NBD
- Abu Dhabi Commercial Bank
- First Abu Dhabi Bank
- Qatar National Bank
- National Bank of Kuwait
- MUFG Bank

=== Digital banks ===
- D360 Bank
- STC Bank
- Vision Bank
- EZ Bank

== Singapore ==
=== Local banks ===
- DBS Bank
- Oversea-Chinese Banking Corporation (OCBC)
- United Overseas Bank (UOB)

=== Qualifying full banks ===
- ABN AMRO
- BNP Paribas
- Citibank International Personal Bank Singapore
- Citibank Singapore
- Hongkong and Shanghai Banking Corporation
- Malayan Banking
- Standard Chartered Bank

=== Merged local banks ===
- Keppel Bank
- Overseas Union Bank (OUB)
- POSBank
- Tat Lee Bank

== Sri Lanka ==
=== Central Bank ===
- Central Bank of Sri Lanka

=== Licensed Commercial Banks ===
- Amana Bank
- Axis Bank Ltd.
- Bank of Ceylon
- Cargills Bank
- Citibank N.A.
- Commercial Bank of Ceylon PLC
- Deutsche Bank AG
- DFCC Bank PLC
- Habib Bank Ltd.
- HSBC Sri Lanka (HSBC)
- Hatton National Bank PLC
- ICICI Bank Ltd.
- Indian Bank
- Indian Overseas Bank
- MCB Bank Ltd.
- National Development Bank PLC
- Nations Trust Bank PLC
- Pan Asia Banking Corporation PLC
- People's Bank
- Public Bank Berhad
- Sampath Bank PLC
- Seylan Bank PLC
- Standard Chartered Bank
- State Bank of India
- Union Bank of Colombo

=== Licensed Specialised Banks ===
- Housing Development Finance Corporation Bank of Sri Lanka (HDFC)
- Lankaputhra Development Bank Ltd.
- National Savings Bank
- Regional Development Bank (Pradheshiya Sanwardhana Bank)
- Sanasa Development Bank PLC
- Sri Lanka Savings Bank Ltd.
- State Mortgage & Investment Bank

=== Licensed Finance Companies ===
- Abans Finance PLC
- Alliance Finance Co. PLC
- AMW Capital Leasing and Finance PLC
- Arpico Finance Co. PLC
- Asia Asset Finance PLC
- Associated Motor Finance Co. PLC
- Bimputh Finance PLC
- BRAC Lanka Finance PLC
- Central Finance Co. PLC
- Central Investments & Finance PLC
- Chilaw Finance PLC
- Citizens Development Business Finance PLC
- City Finance Corporation Ltd.
- Colombo Trust Finance PLC
- Commercial Credit & Finance PLC
- Commercial Leasing & Finance PLC
- ETI Finance Ltd.
- HNB Grameen Finance Ltd.
- Ideal Finance Ltd.
- Kanrich Finance Ltd.
- L B Finance PLC
- LOLC Finance PLC
- Melsta Regal Finance Ltd.
- Mercantile Investments & Finance PLC
- Merchant Bank of Sri Lanka & Finance PLC
- Multi Finance PLC
- Nation Lanka Finance PLC
- Orient Finance PLC
- People's Leasing & Finance PLC
- People's Merchant Finance PLC
- Richard Pieris Finance Ltd.
- Sarvodaya Development Finance Co. Ltd.
- Senkadagala Finance PLC
- Serendib Finance Ltd.
- Singer Finance (Lanka) PLC
- Sinhaputhra Finance PLC
- Siyapatha Finance PLC
- Softlogic Finance PLC
- Summit Finance PLC
- Swarnamahal Financial Services PLC
- The Finance Co. PLC
- The Standard Credit Finance Ltd.
- TKS Finance Ltd.
- Trade Finance & Investments PLC
- U B Finance Co. Ltd
- Vallibel Finance PLC

== Syria ==
=== Central bank ===
- Central Bank of Syria

=== Public banks ===
- Agricultural Cooperative Bank
- Commercial Bank of Syria
- Industrial Bank of Syria
- Popular Credit Bank
- Real-Estate Bank
- Saving Bank

=== Private banks ===
- Arab Bank
- Audi Bank
- Banque BEMO Saudi Fransi
- Bank of Syria and Overseas
- Byblos Bank
- Qatar National Bank
- Syria Gulf Bank
- The International Bank for Trade & Finance

=== Islamic banks ===
- Barake Bank
- Cham Bank
- Syria International Islamic Bank

== Taiwan ==
=== Central bank ===
- Central Bank of the Republic of China (Taiwan)

=== Local banks ===
- Bank of Taiwan
- Bank Sinopac
- Cathay United Bank
- Chinatrust Commercial Bank
- First Commercial Bank
- Hua Nan Bank
- Industrial Bank of Taiwan
- Land Bank of Taiwan
- Mega International Commercial Bank
- Shanghai Commercial and Savings Bank
- Taipei Fubon Bank
- Taishin International Bank
- Taiwan Business Bank
- Taiwan Cooperative Bank
- Union Bank of Taiwan

== Thailand ==
=== Central bank ===
- Bank of Thailand

=== Universal banks ===
- ICBC (Thai) Bank (Formerly ACL Bank)
- Bangkok Bank (No.1 bank in Thailand)
- Bank of Ayudhya
- CIMB Bank Thai (Formerly Union Bank of Bangkok and Bank Thai)
- Kasikorn Bank (No.4 bank in Thailand)
- Kiatnakin Phatra Bank
- Krung Thai Bank (No.2 bank and Government Enterprise in Thailand)
- Land & Houses Bank
- Siam Commercial Bank (No. 3 bank in Thailand)
- Standard Chartered Bank (Thai)
- TMBThanachart Bank (No. 5 bank in Thailand, formerly Thai Military Bank and "TMB Bank")
- Tisco Bank
- United Overseas Bank (Thai) (Formed by the merger of Bank of Asia and UOB Radanasin)

=== Retail banks ===
- AIG Bank (Thailand)
- GE Money Retail Bank (Thailand)(Business sold to Bank of Ayudhya in January 2007)
- Thaicredit Retail Bank

=== Specialized government-owned banks ===
- Bank of Agriculture and Agricultural Cooperatives
- Export–Import Bank of Thailand
- Government Housing Bank
- Government Savings Bank
- Islamic Bank of Thailand (IBank)
- Small and Medium Enterprise Development Bank of Thailand (SME DBank)

=== Merged banks ===
- Bank of Asia - merged with UOB Radanasin to form UOB (Thai)
- DBS Thai Danu Bank - merged with Thai Military Bank
- Industrial Finance Corporation of Thailand - merged with Thai Military Bank
- UOB Radanasin Bank - merged with Bank of Asia to form UOB (Thai)
- Siam City Bank - merged with Thanachart Bank
- Thanachart Bank - merged with "TMB Bank" (Make TMB changed name to "TMBThanachart Bank")

== United Arab Emirates ==
=== Major commercial banks ===
- ABN AMRO
- Abu Dhabi Commercial Bank
- Abu Dhabi Investment Authority
- Allied Bank
- American Express Bank Limited
- Arab Bank
- Axis Bank
- Bank Melli Iran
- Bank of America
- Bank of Baroda
- Bank of China
- Bank of India
- Bank of Jordan
- Bank of New York
- Bank Saderat Iran
- Central Bank of India
- Citibank
- Commercial Bank of Dubai
- Credit Suisse
- Deutsche Bank
- Emirates NBD Bank
- First Abu Dhabi Bank
- Fortis Bank
- Gulf Commercial Bank
- Gulf Merchant Bank
- Habib Bank AG Zurich
- Hang Seng Bank
- HSBC
- ICICI Bank
- Indian Bank
- Invest Bank
- JPMorgan Chase
- MashreqBank
- National Bank of Abu Dhabi - merged with First Gulf Bank and became First Abu Dhabi Bank in 2017
- National Bank of Kuwait
- RAKBANK
- Royal Bank of Canada
- Royal Bank of Scotland
- Scotiabank
- Standard Chartered
- State Bank of India
- Toronto Dominion Bank
- United Bank

=== Islamic banks ===
- Abu Dhabi Islamic Bank
- Ajman Bank
- Dubai Islamic Bank
- Emirates Islamic Bank
- Islamic Commercial Bank
- Noor Islamic Bank
- Sharjah Islamic Bank

=== Defunct or merged banks ===
- Bank of Credit and Commerce International

== Vietnam ==
=== Central bank ===
- State Bank of Vietnam

=== State banks ===
- Bank for Foreign Trade of Vietnam (Vietcombank)
- Bank for Investment and Development of Vietnam (BIDV)
- Vietinbank (Vietnam Joint Stock Commercial Bank for Industry and Trade)
- Vietnam Bank for Agriculture and Rural Development (Agribank)
- Vietnam Bank for Social Policy (VBSP)

=== Joint stock banks ===
==== Big banks ====
- ACB (Asia Commercial Bank)
- EAB (Eastern Asia Commercial Bank)
- Eximbank (Vietnam) (Vietnam Export-Import Commercial Bank)
- GP Bank (Global Petrol Commercial Bank)
- Habubank
- LP Bank (Loc Phat Bank)
- MP (Military Bank)
- OCB (Orient Commercial Bank)
- PG Bank (Petrolimex Global Bank)
- Sacombank (Saigon Thuong Tin Bank)
- Saigon Bank (Saigon Cong Thuong Ngan Hang)
- SeABank (South East Asia Commercial Joint Stock Bank)
- Shinhan Bank Vietnam (Shinhan Bank Vietnam)
- Techcombank (Vietnam Technological and Commercial Joint Stock Bank)
- TP Bank (Tien Phong Bank)
- VIB Bank (Vietnam International Commercial Bank)
- VID Public Bank
- VietABank
- VP Bank

==== Small banks ====
- Vietnam Russia Joint Venture Bank

== Yemen ==
- National Bank of Yemen
- Sabaa Islamic Bank
