= List of banks in North Korea =

This is a list of banks in North Korea.

== List ==
=== Central bank ===
- Central Bank of the Democratic People's Republic of Korea

=== Local banks ===
- Chinmyong Joint Bank(진명합영은행)
- Civilian Cooperation Bank(민사협조은행)
- Daedong Credit Bank
- Daesong Bank
- Foreign Trade Bank of the Democratic People's Republic of Korea
- Kumgang Bank(금강은행)

=== Banks overseas ===
- Golden Star Bank (closed in June 2004)
- Joson Trade Bank
- Tanchon Commercial Bank (formerly called Chang-Kwang Credit Bank)
- Koryo Bank

== See also ==
- Economy of North Korea
