= The Benefit Company =

Local switch in Kingdom of Bahrain

The Benefit Company شركة بنفت
- Company type: Interbank network
- Industry: Finance
- Founded: November 1997
- Headquarters: Bahrain
- Products: Financial services
- Website: www.benefit.bh

The Benefit Company (TBC) is the local switch in the Kingdom of Bahrain handling ATM and POS transactions among other services. Established in 1997 with a special license from the Central Bank of Bahrain as "Provider of Ancillary Services to the Financial Sector", it is the only financial network of its kind in the country.

== ATM and POS ==
Benefit's initial services included connecting the ATM services of the local banks in Bahrain and handling the settlements. In addition, it connected the POS terminals to all the local issuers in the Kingdom.

== GCCNET ==
In addition to local switching, Benefit is also connected to GCC Net, the main switch operating on all GCC countries. A connection was also established with Shetab in 2005; linking all BENEFIT users with Iran's only switch.

== Payment gateway ==
In 2006, the company offered the payment gateway service, integrating more of the local banks onto one payment hub, allowing banks and their merchants to perform online transactions.

== Electronic check clearing ==
In May 2012, Benefit started running the nation's check truncation system. Thus, enabling 29 banks in the Kingdom to settle checks the same day.

== Member banks in the network ==
- Bank ABC
- Bank al Habib
- Bank of Bahrain and Kuwait
- Citibank
- HSBC
- Shamil Bank of Bahrain
- Kuwait Finance House
- National Bank of Bahrain
- Standard Chartered Bank
- Bahrain Islamic Bank
- Ahli United Bank
- Bahraini Saudi Bank
- Citibank
- National Bank of Kuwait
- National Bank of Abu Dhabi
- Khaleeji Commercial Bank
- Mashreq Bank
- Al Salam Bank
- Eskan Bank
- ICICI Bank
- State Bank of India

== See also ==
- ATM
- POS
