= BBK =

BBK may refer to:

== Education ==
- BBK DAV College for Women, Amritsar, Punjab, India (founded 1967)
- Birkbeck, University of London, an English research university (founded 1823)

== Finance ==
- Barclays Bank of Kenya (founded 1916)
- Bank of Bahrain and Kuwait (founded 1971)
- Bilbao Bizkaia Kutxa, Basque Country, Spain (1990–2012)
- BBK, a company involved in the 2007 BBK stock price manipulation incident

== Music ==
- "B.B.K." (song), by Korn from their 1998 album Follow the Leader
- Bluebottle Kiss, an Australian indie rock band
- Boy Better Know, a British grime crew and label
- Breakbeat Kaos, a British drum and bass label

== Places ==
- Birkbeck Court, a student residence in Glasgow, Scotland
- Kasane Airport, Botswana
- White Sea–Baltic Canal (Russian: Byelomorsko–Baltiyskiy Kanal)

== Sport ==
- Blåsuts BK, a Swedish bandy club
- Brønshøj BK, a Danish football club

== Other uses ==
- Bigg Boss Kannada, reality TV series
- BBK Electronics (Bu Bu Gao), a Chinese electronics producer
- BBK Russian Library-Bibliographical Classification (Bibliotechno-Bibliograficheskaya Klassifikatsiya), a Russian library classification system
