= HBFC =

HBFC may refer to:

- House Building Finance Corporation
- House Building Finance Corporation cricket team

== Football clubs ==
- Haringey Borough F.C.
- Harrow Borough F.C.
- Herne Bay F.C.
- Hillingdon Borough F.C.
- Hillsborough Boys F.C.
- Hollands & Blair F.C.
- Hounslow Borough F.C.
- Hunan Billows F.C.
