= List of banks in Myanmar =

This is the list of banks in Myanmar. There are a total of 31 local banks and 13 foreign branched banks in Myanmar.

== Central bank ==
- Central Bank of Myanmar

== State-owned banks ==
1. Myanma Agricultural Development Bank
2. Myanma Economic Bank
3. Myanma Foreign Trade Bank
4. Myanma Investment and Commercial Bank

== Credit Bureau ==
| No | Name | Date of Licence Issued | Head-Office Address |
|---|---|---|---|
| 1. | Myanmar Credit Bureau Limited | 17.5.2018 | No.221, 9th Floor, Sule Square Office Tower, Sule Pagoda Road, Kyauktada Township, Yangon |

== Semi-government banks ==
1. Construction, Housing and Infrastructure Development Bank
2. Global Treasure Bank (formerly Myanmar Livestock and Fisheries Development Bank)
3. Innwa Bank
1. Myawaddy Bank
2. Naypyitaw Development Bank Limited
3. Rural Development Bank
4. Yadanabon Bank
5. Yangon City Bank

== Private banks ==
| Sr. No. | Name of Bank | Date of Licence Issued | Head-Office Address |
|---|---|---|---|
| 1 | Myanmar Citizens Bank Ltd** | 25.5.1992 | No.383/Mahabandoola Road, Kyuktada Township, Yangon |
| 2 | First Private Bank Ltd*** | 25.5.1992 | No.619/621 Corner of Merchant Road & Bo Son Pat Street, Pabedan Township, Yangon |
| 3 | CB Bank PCL* | 3.8.1992 | No.334/336 Corner of Strand Road and 23rd street, Latha Township, Yangon |
| 4 | Yadanabon Bank Ltd*** | 27.8.1992 | No.58(A) 26 Bayintnaung Street Between 8485 Street, Aung Myay Tharzan Township, Mandalay |
| 5 | Myawaddy Bank Ltd** | 1.1.1993 | No.151, Corner of Bogyoke Aung San Road & Wardan Street, 8th Ward, Lanmadaw Township, Yangon |
| 6 | Yangon City Bank Ltd** | 19.3.1993 | No.12/18, Sibin Road, Kyauktada Township, Yangon |
| 7 | Yoma Bank Ltd* | 26.7.1993 | No.14, Kyaik Khauk Pagoda Road, Star City, Thanlyin Township, Yangon |
| 8 | Myanmar Oriental Bank Ltd*** | 26.7.1993 | No.166/168 Pansodan Street, Kyauktada Township, Yangon |
| 9 | Tun Commercial Bank Ltd*** | 8.6.1994 | No.230, Mahabandoola Road, Corner of Bo Myat Tun Street, Botataung Township Yangon |
| 10 | Kanbawza Bank Ltd* | 8.6.1994 | 615/1, Pyay Road, Kamayut Township, Yangon |
| 11 | Small & Medium Enterprises Development Bank Ltd*** | 12.1.1996 | No. 298, Corner of Anawyahtar Street & Wadan Street, Lanmadaw Township, Yangon |
| 12 | Global Treasure Bank Ltd** | 9.2.1996 | No.654/666 Merchant Road Pabedan Township, Yangon |
| 13 | Rural Development Bank Ltd.*** | 26.6.1996 | Plot-2, Compound of Thiriyadanar Super Market, Naypyitaw |
| 14 | Innwa Bank Ltd** | 15.5.1997 | No. Ou-3, Corner of Kyaing Tone and Bago Street, Zawanatheiddhi Ward, Ottra Thiri Township, Naypyitaw |
| 15 | Asia Green Development Bank Ltd** | 2.7.2010 | No.168, Thiri Yatanar Shopping Complex, Zabu Thiri Township, Nay Pyi Taw |
| 16 | Ayeyarwady Bank Public Company Limited- AYA Bank PCL* | 2.7.2010 | No.416, Mahabandoola Street, Kyauktada Township, Yangon |
| 17 | uab Bank Limited* | 2.7.2010 | uab Tower@Times City Level 21, Kyun Taw Road, Kamaryut Township, Yangon |
| 18 | Myanma Apex Bank Ltd* | 2.7.2010 | No.207, Theinphyu Road (Middle Block), Botahtaung Township, Yangon |
| 19 | Nay Pyi Taw Development Bank Limited*** | 28.2.2013 | No.A/09, Thirikyawswar Street, Thiriyadanar Shopping Complex, Zabuthiri Township, Nay Pyi Taw |
| 20 | Myanmar Metro Bank Limited*** | 2.7.2013 | No.31, Corner of Pyi Road & Maharmyaing Street, Kyuntaw Middle Ward, SanchaungTownship, Yangon |
| 21 | Construction, Housing and Infrastructure Development Bank Limited*** | 12.7.2013 | No.60, Shwedagon Pagoda Road, Dagon Township, Yangon |
| 22 | Shwe (Rural and Urban) Development Bank Limited*** | 28-7-2014 | No.66/76, Corner of Merchant Road & Pansodan Street, Kyauktada Township, Yangon |
| 23 | Ayeyarwaddy Farmers Development Bank Limited(A Bank)* | 17-11-2015 | No.33, Corner of Mahar Bandoola Road and Myaing Haymar Road, Ward (3), Pathein |
| 24 | Glory Farmer Development Bank Limited (G Bank)*** | 8.6.2018 | No.149, Corner of Bogyoke Road & Circular Street, South Monywa Quarter, Monywa |
| 25 | Mineral Development Bank(Public Company Limited)*** | 6.7.2018 | No.1/66, Kabar Aye Pagoda Road, Mayangone Township, Yangon |
| 26 | Myanma Tourism Bank Limited*** | 9.7.2018 | No.143/149, Sule Pagoda Road, Kyauktada Township, Yangon |
| 27 | Farmers Development Bank Limited-Mandalay(FDB)*** | 19.2.2020 | No.70, 84th street, Between 28th and 29th Street, Chan Aye TharSan Township, Mandalay |

Note:*Large-size bank, **Medium-size bank, ***Small-size bank

== Foreign banks ==
(notified by Central Bank of Myanmar)

List of Foreign Bank Branches in Myanmar
| Sr. No. | Bank Name | License Date | Commencement Date | Branch Address |
|---|---|---|---|---|
| 1 | MUFG Bank, Ltd. | 2-4-2015 | 22-4-2015 | Union Financial Centre, Corner of Maharbandoola Road and Thein Phyu Road, Botahtaung Township, Yangon 11121, Republic of the Union of Myanmar |
| 2 | Oversea-Chinese Banking Corporation Ltd | 2-4-2015 | 23-4-2015 | Suite No.5# 21-01 to 05, Junction City Tower, No. 3/A, Corner of Bogyoke Aung San Road, and 27th Street Pabedan Township, Yangon, 11141, Republic of the Union of Myanmar |
| 3 | Sumitomo Mitsui Banking Corporation | 2-4-2015 | 23-4-2015 | Level 5, No.53, Strand Office Complex (The Strand Square), Strand Road, Pabedan Township, Yangon, 11141, Republic of the Union of Myanmar |
| 4 | United Overseas Bank Limited | 30-4-2015 | 4-5-2015 | Unit # 12-01/02/03, Level 12, Junction City Office Tower, Corner of Bogyoke Aung San Road and 27th Street, Pabedan Township 11141, Yangon, Republic of the Union of Myanmar |
| 5 | Bangkok Bank Public Company Limited | 26-5-2015 | 2-6-2015 | No. 5, Kabar Aye Pagoda Road, Yankin Township, Yangon 11081, Republic of the Union of Myanmar |
| 6 | Industrial and Commercial Bank of China | 26-5-2015 | 1-7-2015 | 19th Floor, Crystal Tower, Kyun Taw Road, Kamayut Township, Yangon, 11041, Republic of the Union of Myanmar |
| 7 | Malayan Banking Berhad (Maybank) | 27-7-2015 | 3-8-2015 | 7th Floor, Centerpoint Towers, No. 65, Corner of Sule Pagoda Road and Merchant Road, Kyauktada Township, Yangon, 11182, Republic of the Union of Myanmar |
| 8 | Mizuho Bank Limited | 27-7-2015 | 3-8-2015 | Room#03-12, Level 4, Sedona Business Suites, No.1 Ka Ba Aye Pagoda Road, Yankin Township, Yangon 11081, Republic of the Union of Myanmar |
| 9 | The Joint Stock Commercial Bank for Investment and Development of Vietnam (BIDV) | 30-6-2016 | 1-7-2016 | 9th Floor, Myanmar Center Tower 1, No.192, Kabar Aye Pagoda Road, Bahan Township, Yangon 11201, Republic of the Union of Myanmar |
| 10 | Shinhan Bank | 15-9-2016 | 20-9-2016 | 10th Floor, Myanmar Center Tower 1, No.192, Kabar Aye Pagoda Road, Bahan Township, Yangon 11201, Republic of the Union of Myanmar |
| 11 | E.Sun Commercial Bank Limited | 27-9-2016 | 3-10-2016 | Level 21, Myanmar Center Tower 1, No.192, Kabar Aye Pagoda Road, Bahan Township, Yangon 11201, Republic of the Union of Myanmar |
| 12 | State Bank of India | 27-9-2016 | 3-10-2016 | Unit No.B# 01-03B, Tower-B, Union Financial Center, Corner of Mahabandoola Road & Thein Phyu Road, Botahtaung Township, Yangon 11161, Republic of the Union of Myanmar |
| 13 | Mega International Commercial Bank Co., Ltd. | 5-1-2021 | 7-1-2021 | Unit No.12-08/09/10, Level 12, Junction City Tower, Corner of Bogyoke Aung San Road and 27th Street, Pabedan Township, Yangon, 11141, Republic of the Union of Myanmar |
| 14 | The Korea Development Bank | 6-1-2021 | 8-1-2021 | Unit 19-(08/09/10), 19th Floor, Junction City Office Tower, Corner of Bogyoke Aung San Road and 27th Street, Pabedan Township, Yangon, 11141, Republic of the Union of Myanmar |
| 15 | Cathay United Bank Co., Ltd. | 6-1-2021 | 6-1-2021 | Unit 21-(07/08/09/10), 21st Floor, Junction City Tower, No-3/A, Corner of Bogyoke Aung San Road and 27th Street, Pabedan Township, Yangon, 11141, Republic of the Union of Myanmar |
| 16 | Bank of China(Hong Kong) Limited | 28-1-2021 | 28-1-2021 | Zone B, 1st Floor, Golden City Business Center, Yankin Road, Yankin Township, Yangon, 11081, Republic of the Union of Myanmar |

== See also ==
- Central Bank of Myanmar
