= Sultan Ali Chaudhry =

Sultan Ali Chaudhry was a former chairman, board of directors of Zarai Taraqiati Bank Limited and a former Pakistan government minister and adviser to Prime Minister of Pakistan.

He was also held various positions:

- President, Chamber of Agriculture, Punjab
- Member of advisory council of Integrated Rural Development Program
- Member of Agriculture Pesticide Technical advisory Committee of Pakistan
- Member, Provincial Council Punjab
- Member of National Assembly (Pakistan)
- Minister of Agriculture, Government of Punjab, Pakistan
- Managing Director, Zimcon (Pvt.) Ltd
- Managing Director Punjab Farm Machinery Corp. (Pvt.) Ltd

In 2002, Chaudhry stood as PML-N candidate for the Faisalabad division in the provincial elections.

He is also author of various books concerning agriculture

- State Of Agriculture In Pakistan, Brite Books, 2006, ISBN 9789698780128
- Pakistan aur ziraat (in Urdu), Brite Books, 2007, ISBN 9789698780142
- Lectures & Articles on Agriculture, Caxton Printing Press
