= 2018 North Korean census =

The Government of North Korea had planned to hold a census in the country in 2018, ten years after the 2008 census. However, the census was reportedly canceled because South Korea had stopped funding the project (because such funding would be in violation of international sanctions, specifically Resolution 2371 which sanctions the nation's Foreign Trade Bank).

Before it was canceled, it was expected that the census would show a moderate increase in population, with growth lower than in previous decades. This is because the Total Fertility Rate stayed constant at about 1.9 births/woman between 2008 and 2018, slightly below the replacement rate of 2.1.

In 2019, North Korea reportedly told the UN that it planned to hold a census that year, but without UN funding. This is reportedly because few nations wanted to give North Korea the funding because they feared violating sanctions. The UN believed that the data will be less reliable, which would hurt aid efforts in the country. Despite the North's claim, the results of the census were never made public internationally, so it is unknown whether or not it actually took place. A similar situation occurred with the 2008 Census, whose results were not made public until 2010.
