= Martin Röing =

Swedish bandy player

Martin Röing (born May 10, 1979) is a Swedish bandy player who currently plays in IFK Vänersborg as a defender. Martin was brought up by Blåsut BK. Martin has represented both the Swedish national bandy team and the 'young' Swedish side.

Martin has played for the following clubs:

Blåsut BK
IFK Vänersborg (1998-2006)
Blåsut BK (2002-2003)
Hammarby IF Bandy (2006-2007)
Uralsky Trubnik (2007)
IFK Vänersborg (2008-)
