= Central bank of Korea =

Central bank of Korea may refer to:

- Bank of Korea, the central bank of South Korea
- Central Bank of the Democratic People's Republic of Korea, the central bank of North Korea
- Bank of Chōsen, the central bank of Korea under Japanese rule, and of South Korea under American occupation
