= OCB =

OCB may refer to:

== Arts, entertainment, and media ==
- O.c.b. (album), a 2009 album by O.S.T.R.
- "O.C.B.", a song by Joey Badass from his 2015 album B4.Da.$$
- OCB, a song by Billy Ze Kick et les Gamins en Folie on their 1993 self-titled album
- OCB, a song by Malaa
- OCB, abbreviation of The Oxford Companion to Beer
- Orange Catholic Bible, a fictional book from the Dune universe created by Frank Herbert

== Brands and enterprises ==
- Odet-Cascadec-Bolloré, a brand of cigarette rolling papers manufactured by Republic Tobacco
- Old Country Buffet, American restaurant chain
- Orient Commercial Joint Stock Bank (OCB), a large bank located in Vietnam

== Sports ==
- Óquei Clube de Barcelos, a rink hockey team from Barcelos, Portugal
- Orlando City B, a soccer team in Florida, United States

== Other uses ==
- OCB mode, a mode of operation for cryptographic block ciphers
- Oil circuit breaker, a form of circuit breaker using oil as an insulating medium
- Oligoclonal bands, bands of immunoglobulins that are seen in a patient's serum or CSF
- Operations Coordinating Board (1953–1961), a committee of the United States Executive
- Ordinary course of business, a term in law covering the usual transactions, customs and practices of a certain business and of a certain firm
- Organizational citizenship behavior, a special type of work behavior
