= MFTB =

MFTB may refer to:

- Maria fold and thrust belt
- Myanma Foreign Trade Bank
- Multi Functional Training Brigade, a type of brigade in the U.S. Army
