= Koryo Bank =

North Korean bank

Koryo Bank is a North Korean bank. It was originally opened in July 1994.

== History ==
The bank has about thirty employees and has regional offices specializing in weapon sales in the Middle East, Myanmar, and Africa.

It is controlled by Korean Workers' Party Office 39 to control "the service industry, hotels and department stores that cater to foreigners".

According to Business Insider, Koryo Bank is the financial institution used by the North Korean Office 39 "to repatriate and hold foreign currency accounts" and, at one time, under the control of the Ministry of Defense.

At one time, the bank's leader was Kim Yong-goo. The bank use to belong to the Trade Bank.

== See also ==
- List of banks in North Korea
