= Kim Chon-gyun =

North Korean politician (born 1960)

- 김천균

President of the Central Bank

14th term
- In office 11 April 2019 – 18 January 2021
- President: Kim Jong Un
- Premier: Kim Tok-hun; Kim Jae-ryong
- Succeeded by: Chae Song-hak

13th term
- In office 9 April 2014 – 11 April 2019
- Chairman: Kim Jong Un
- Premier: Pak Pong-ju
- Preceded by: Ri Kwang-gon

Personal details
- Born: 17 March 1960 (age 65)
- Political party: Workers' Party of Korea

Korean name
- Hangul: 김천균
- Hanja: 金千均
- RR: Gim Cheongyun
- MR: Kim Ch'ŏn'gyun

Kim Chon-gyun (Korean: 김천균, born 17 March 1960) is a North Korean politician and served as President of the Central Bank of the Democratic People's Republic of Korea since 2014.

In May 2016, he was elected as an alternate member of the Central Committee of the Workers' Party of Korea. He was reelected in March 2019.
