= Chae Song-hak =

North Korean politician (born c. 1955)

- 채성학

President of the Central Bank
- In office 18 January 2021 – 28 September 2023
- President: Kim Jong Un
- Premier: Kim Tok-hun
- Succeeded by: Paek Min Gwang
- Preceded by: Kim Chon-gyun

Vice Chairman of the Port Authority of Rason City
- In office 2005–2010

Personal details
- Born: 1955 (age 70–71)
- Party: Workers' Party of Korea

Chae Song-hak (Korean: 채성학; born c. 1955) is a North Korean politician who served as the President of the Central Bank of the Democratic People's Republic of Korea from 2021 to 2023. He was also the Vice Chairman of the Port Authority of Rason City from 2005 to 2010.

== Career ==
=== Rason City ===
As the Vice Chairman of the Port Authority in Rason, Chae was reportedly instrumental in the idea and establishment of its free-trade zone.

=== President of the Central Bank ===
Chae was appointed as President of the Central Bank in January 2021 to succeed Kim Chon-gyun. Due to his position, he then became a member of the 14th Cabinet of North Korea. He was also named as a member of the Central Committee.
