= Bank Makramah =

Pakistani Islamic bank

- Formerly: Arif Habib Bank (2007–2010); Summit Bank (2010–2023)
- Type: Public
- Traded as: PSX: BML
- Industry: Banking
- Founded: 2006; 20 years ago
- Headquarters: Karachi-75600, Pakistan
- Number of locations: 193 (2022)
- Key people: Waseem Mehdi Syed (Chairman); Jawad Majid Khan (CEO)
- Products: bank loans; debit cards; savings accounts
- Revenue: ▼ Rs. -867 million (US$−3.1 million) (2022)
- Operating income: ▼ Rs. -7.29 billion (US$−26 million) (2022)
- Net income: ▼ Rs. -3.16 billion (US$−11 million) (2022)
- Total assets: ▲ Rs. 140.71 billion (US$500 million) (2022)
- Owner: Nasser Abdulla Hussain Lootah (60.44%); Suroor Investments (26.59%)
- Number of employees: 1,645 (2022)
- Parent: Suroor Investments Limited
- Website: bankmakramah.com

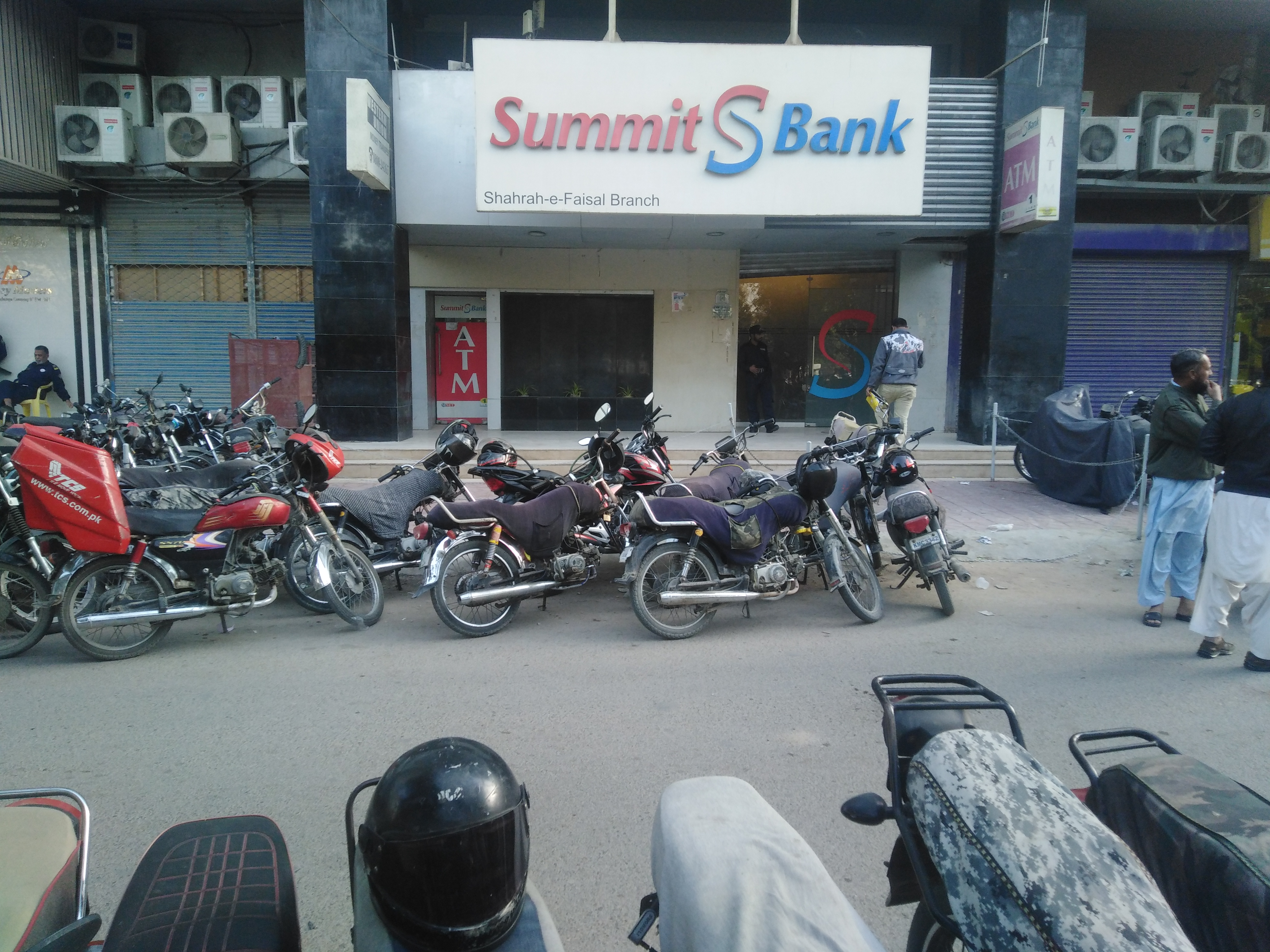
Former Summit Bank's branch in Karachi

Bank Makramah Limited (Urdu: بینک مکرمہ لمیٹڈ), formerly Summit Bank, is a Pakistani Islamic bank based in Karachi, Pakistan.

== History ==
=== 2006–2010: Arif Habib Bank ===
Bank Makramah Limited's origins go back to Rupali Bank Limited, which had a limited presence as a foreign bank. Due to an increase in paid-up capital requirements by the State Bank of Pakistan, it became difficult for the bank to operate as a stand-alone entity. In 2006, Arif Habib Securities Limited acquired the Pakistani operations of Rupali Bank Limited, under the Scheme of Amalgamation by the State Bank of Pakistan. The resulting bank was named Arif Habib Rupali Bank, and it began operations on 5 August 2006.

In 2008, then known as Arif Habib Bank was listed on the Karachi Stock Exchange.

=== 2010–2023: Summit Bank ===
In 2010, Suroor Investments Ltd. acquired a 59.41 percent stake in Arif Habib Bank Ltd. Suroor Investments is an investment firm based in Mauritius. Later in 2010, Arif Habib Bank Ltd. was rebranded under the name of Summit Bank Ltd.

Suroor Investments Ltd. acquired the majority shares of Atlas Bank Ltd. and MyBank Ltd. and these banks were later on came under the umbrella of Summit Bank Ltd., increasing the network of the bank to over 193 branches in the country.

=== 2023–present: Bank Makramah ===
In November 2023, Summit Bank Limited was converted into an Islamic bank and accordingly renamed as Bank Makramah Limited.

== Shareholding pattern ==
In April 2023, Dubai-based businessman, Nasser Abdullah Hussain Lootah acquired a majority stake in Bank Makramah.
