= Nepal Infrastructure Bank Limited =

Nepal Infrastructure Bank Limited नेपाल इन्फ्रास्ट्रक्चर बैंक लिमिटेड
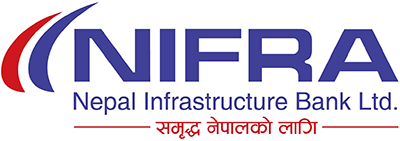
- Company type: Public
- Traded as: NEPSE: 2919
- Industry: Bank
- Founded: June 18, 2018; 7 years ago
- Headquarters: Baneshwor Kathmandu, Nepal
- Key people: Mr. Krishna Bahadur Adhikari CEO
- Number of employees: 45 (2022)
- Website: www.nifrabank.com

Nepal Infrastructure Bank Limited (NIFRA) was founded with the primary objective of propelling the nation's infrastructure development. Its focus lies in investments in sustainable infrastructure and various productive sectors. The inception of this dedicated infrastructure development bank was driven by the recognized need within Nepal, prompting the Government of Nepal (GoN) and Nepal Rastra Bank to pave the way for its establishment through the Annual Budget for the Fiscal Year 2015/16 and the subsequent Monetary Policy of that year. As a result, Nepal Infrastructure Bank Limited was officially registered under the Ministry of Industry and Commerce, Company Registrar’s Office on June 8, 2018.

== Share Holding Partnership ==
- Nepal Government: 10%
- Private Investors: 10%
- Public Companies: 40%
- General Public: 40%
- Public Shares: Can be traded in NEPSE
