= United Nations Security Council Resolution 2371 =

UN Security Council Resolution 2371
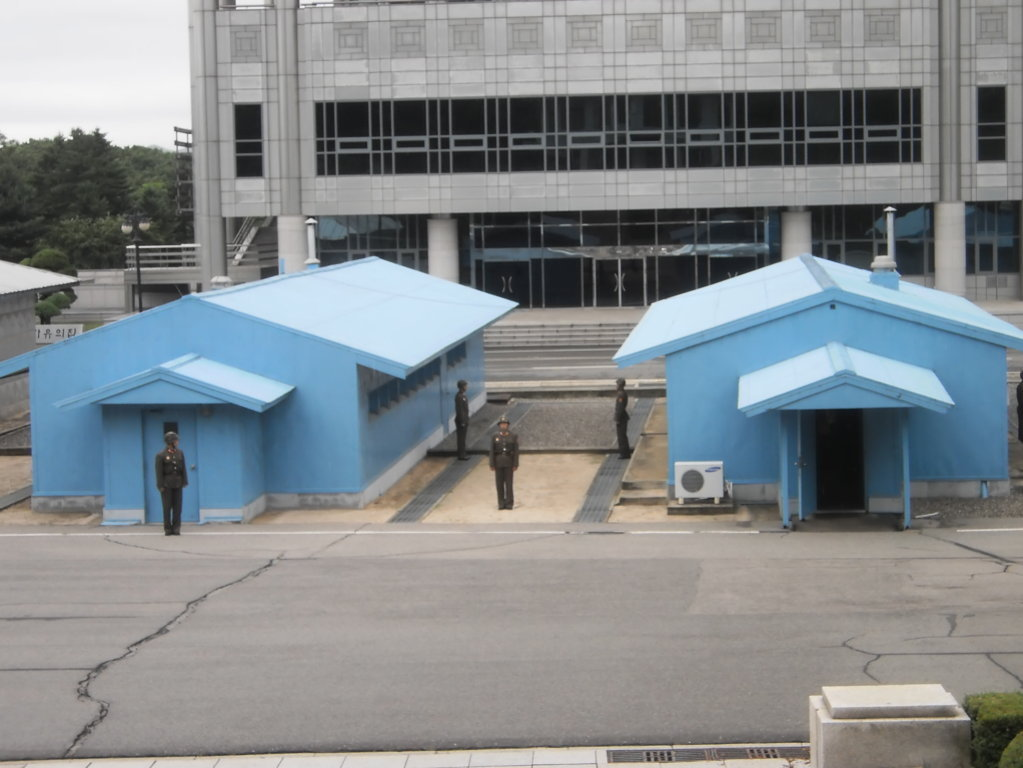
- Korean DMZ
- Date: 5 August 2017
- Meeting no.: 8019
- Code: S/RES/2371 (Document)
- Subject: Non-proliferation: Democratic People's Republic of Korea
- Voting summary: 15 voted for; None voted against; None abstained
- Result: Adopted

Security Council composition
- Permanent members: China; France; Russia; United Kingdom; United States
- Non-permanent members: Bolivia; Egypt; Ethiopia; Italy; Japan; Kazakhstan; Senegal; Sweden; Ukraine; Uruguay

The United Nations Security Council unanimously adopted Resolution 2371 on August 5, 2017, with approval of all the five permanent members and the ten non-permanent members in response to North Korea's July 2017 missile tests.

The resolution tightened economic sanctions for the 6th time, since they were first imposed in 2006, when North Korea had its first nuclear test.

The new restrictions ban purchases of North Korean coal, iron, lead and seafood (the country's main exports). According to some estimates, this will deprive the regime of $1 billion a year—a third of its foreign earnings. The sanctions also prohibit governments around the world from admitting any more North Korean workers, as the regime pockets most of their wages.

== Background ==
Before adopting this resolution, North Korea had conducted 14 missile tests in 2017, advancing its capabilities to eventually deliver a nuclear warhead. The tests in July 2017 were of intercontinental ballistic missiles. For the first time they demonstrated the capability by the DPR Korea to deliver warheads to even as far as part of the continental U.S.

Continued efforts by North Korea in advancing the host of technologies to allow them to launch a nuclear strike, led the UN to for the 6th time impose tightening economic sanctions against the country since they were first imposed in 2006.

== Sanctions ==
The resolution imposes several full sectoral bans on exports North Korea uses to fund its nuclear and ballistic missile programs, namely:

- A ban on its largest export, coal, representing a loss to North Korea of over $401 million in revenues per year;
- A ban on iron and iron ore exports, worth roughly $250 million per year;
- A ban on seafood exports, worth roughly $300 million in revenue each year; and
- A ban on lead and lead ore exports, worth roughly $110 million per year;

Sanctions also tighten North Korea's access to the international financial system, by expanding prior financial sanctions to include a foreign asset freeze of North Korea's Foreign Trade Bank.

It also bans countries from accepting new North Korean laborers.

== Analysis ==
According to some estimates, the new tightening of sanctions will deprive the regime of $1 billion a year, a third of its foreign earnings.

According to sources interviewed by The Economist, the regime has grown adept at dodging the restrictions, using illicit slush funds in China to finance business partnerships. The higher commissions on offer for such risky transactions simply attract more capable middlemen. Enforcement has been patchy: of the UN's 193 members, only 77 have reported on their implementation of the previous round of sanctions, adopted in November 2016.

Further, China, which accounts for more than 90% of North Korea's trade, has promised to apply the new restrictions “fully and strictly”. However, they do not include the one measure thought likely to cause the regime real difficulty: a curb on the North's imports of oil.
