= Thanachart Bank =

Former Thai bank

Thanachart Bank ธนาคารธนชาต
- Company type: Public
- Traded as: SET: TCAP
- Industry: Banking
- Defunct: 2021
- Fate: Merged with TMB Bank into TMBThanachart Bank
- Headquarters: Pathum Wan, Bangkok, Thailand
- Number of locations: 617 branches, 51 foreign exchange booths, 2,100 ATMs
- Area served: Thailand
- Key people: Mr Somjate Moosirilert, President and CEO
- Net income: 9,922 million baht
- Total assets: 1,008,890 million baht
- Number of employees: 14,806
- Parent: Thanachart Capital PCL (TCAP)
- Website: www.thanachartbank.co.th

Thanachart Bank Public Company Limited (TBank) (Thai: ธนาคารธนชาต) was a bank headquartered in Bangkok, Thailand. It commenced operations on 22 April 2002 with Thanachart Capital PCL (TCAP) as its parent company. In 2018, it was Thailand's sixth-largest bank in assets. In 2021, it was merged with TMB Bank into TMBThanachart Bank.

== History ==
Thanachart Bank began operations on 22 April 2002 with a restricted banking license. It was granted a full commercial banking license by the Ministry of Finance on 1 March 2004.

In 2007, Scotiabank bought 24.98 percent of TBank's shares, later increased to 48.99 percent. TCAP's shareholding portion decreased to 50.92 percent. In July 2011 Scotiabank transferred all of its Thanachart Bank shareholdings to Scotia Netherlands Holdings B.V. As of 31 December 2014, TBank was 50.96 percent owned by TCAP and 48.99 percent owned by Scotia Netherlands Holdings.

== TMBThanachart Bank ==
In 2019, Thanachart agreed to merge with TMB Bank, a retail bank in Thailand, which would make the merged bank the sixth largest bank in Thailand. The merger is completed on 5 July 2021. Initially, TMBThanachart (ttb bank) will have 91 branches, 58 in Bangkok and 33 in the provinces. Praphan Anupongongarch is President of TMB-Thanachart Bank.

== Performance ==
For the year ending 31 December 2014, Thanachart reported total assets of 1,008,890 million baht. Net profit for the year was 9,922 million baht. At the end of 2014 the bank had 617 branches, 51 foreign exchange booths, 14,806 employees, and 2,100 ATMs. It has four million customers at 600 branches nationwide.

== Shareholder ==
Major shareholders as of 10 March 2020:

1. Thai NVDR Co., Ltd. 13.289%
2. MBK PUBLIC COMPANY LIMITED 11.150%
3. THANACHART CAPITAL PUBLIC COMPANY LIMITED 6.547%
4. STATE STREET EUROPE LIMITED 5.761%
5. SOUTH EAST ASIA UK (TYPE C) NOMINEES LIMITED 2.450%
