= Bahrain Islamic Bank =

Commercial bank based in Manama, Bahrain

- Industry: Financial services
- Founded: 7 March 1979
- Headquarters: Al Salam Tower, Building 722, Road 1708, Block 317, Manama, Bahrain
- Key people: Chief Executive Officer: Yaser Alsharifi
- Number of employees: 329 (2022)
- Website: bisb.com

Bahrain Islamic Bank is a commercial bank based in Manama, Bahrain, founded on 7 March 1979, and started operating from the beginning of the Hijri Year 1400 (2nd of Muharram) which was the 22 November 1979. It is the first Islamic bank in the Kingdom of Bahrain, works under supervision of the Central Bank of Bahrain and is listed on the Bahrain Stock Exchange.

== History ==
In January 2016, the Moody's Investors Service confirmed its ratings and upgraded the standalone baseline credit assessment (BCA) to b3 from caa1.

In 2017, as part of a five-year growth plan, the bank outlined strategies to boost its performance, one of which involved selling around 82 million dinars (£166 million) worth of unproductive assets, including land and shares. During the initial six months, the bank successfully sold assets worth 14 million dinars. By prioritizing its core lending business and implementing these asset sales, the bank aimed to streamline operations and foster additional growth.

In 2019, the National Bank of Bahrain, which held a stake in Bahrain Islamic Bank, put forward an offer to acquire its remaining shares. The proposed agreement depended on the bank obtaining a minimum 40.94 percent stake in Bahrain Islamic Bank through either cash or a share exchange. The agreed-upon valuation for Bahrain Islamic Bank amounted to 124 million dinars ($329 million). The offer aligned with the trend of mergers in the Middle East's financial sector, driven by reduced government and consumer spending due to weakened oil prices, impacting profit margins.

In November, the bank signed a cooperation agreement with telecom services group STC Bahrain, aiming to implement a set of initiatives for small and medium-sized enterprises. In December, the bank signed an agreement with Delmon Gate to offer real estate financing options and benefits for the Bushra housing project located in Alsayah.

== Products ==
=== Islamic Banking AI Platform ===
In 2023, the bank announced plans to create the first AI platform for Islamic Banking Sharia Fatwas. The platform will incorporate Fatwas issued by the Sharia Supervisory Board, utilizing over 1,800 Fatawa and Sharia decisions.

== See also ==
- List of banks in Asia
