= Bank of Florida =

Bancorp in Florida, United States

Bank of Florida Corporation
- Industry: Banking
- Founded: August 24, 1999; 27 years ago
- Defunct: May 28, 2010; 16 years ago
- Fate: Bank failure; assets acquired by EverBank
- Headquarters: Naples, Florida
- Key people: Michael L. McMullan (president & CEO); Tracy L. Keegan (CFO)
- Revenue: ▼$0.071 billion (2009)
- Net income: ▼ -$0.147 billion (2009)
- Total assets: ▲$1.529 billion (2009)
- Total equity: ▼$0.165 billion (2009)
- Number of employees: 218 (2009)

Bank of Florida Corporation was a bank holding company based in Naples, Florida. The company operated 3 separate banks: Bank of Florida – Southwest, Bank of Florida – Southeast, and Bank of Florida – Tampa Bay.

On Friday, May 28, 2010, as a result of bank failure, the banks were shut down by the Florida Office of Financial Regulation. They were placed into receivership and the Federal Deposit Insurance Corporation was named receiver. The assets of the banks were sold to EverBank.

At the time of the failure, Francis Rooney, the former U.S. ambassador to the Vatican, was the largest single shareholder of the bank, owning 3.38%.

== History ==
On August 24, 1999, Bank of Florida – Southwest commenced operations in Naples, Florida.

On July 16, 2002, Bank of Florida – Southeast opened for business in Fort Lauderdale, Florida.

On November 5, 2004, Bank of Florida – Tampa Bay opened for business in Tampa, Florida.

In the first quarter of 2010, Florida regulators warned the bank to raise capital or face being shut down.

On Friday, May 28, 2010, as a result of bank failure, the banks were shut down by the Florida Office of Financial Regulation. They were placed into receivership and the Federal Deposit Insurance Corporation was named receiver. The assets of the banks were sold to EverBank.
