= Tanchon Commercial Bank =

North Korean bank

- Industry: Bank
- Headquarters: Pyongyang, North Korea

Korean name
- Hangul: 단천상업은행
- Hanja: 端川商業銀行
- RR: Dancheon sangeop eunhaeng
- MR: Tanch'ŏn sangŏp ŭnhaeng

Former name 1
- Hangul: 창광신용은행
- Hanja: 蒼光信用銀行
- RR: Changgwang sinyong eunhaeng
- MR: Ch'anggwang sinyong ŭnhaeng

Former name 2
- Hangul: 룡악산은행
- Hanja: 龍岳山銀行
- RR: Ryongaksan eunhaeng
- MR: Ryongaksan ŭnhaeng

Tanchon Commercial Bank (formerly called Changgwang Credit Bank; possibly called Danchon Bank) is a North Korean bank. It was originally opened in August 1986.

== History ==
Tanchon Bank has about thirty employees and has regional offices specializing in weapon sales in the Middle East, Myanmar, and Africa.

According to a Business Insider article, it is the financial institution used "to repatriate and hold foreign currency accounts" and under the control of the Ministry of Industry.

The bank's purpose was to handle transactions concerning Yongaksan Trading Company and as a fund manager for the Second Economic Committee. At one time, the bank's leader was Maeng Bong-shik.

The bank's address is Saemul 1-Dong Pyongchon District, Pyongyang, North Korea.

Mun Chong-chol is a Tanchon Commercial Bank representative.

== See also ==
- List of banks in North Korea
