= Ahlibank =

Bank of Qatar

- Native name: البنك الأهلي ش.م.ق
- Industry: Financial services
- Headquarters: Doha, Qatar
- Key people: Sh. Faisal Bin Abdulaziz Al Thani (Chairman)
- Services: Banking
- Number of employees: 405
- Website: www.ahlibank.com.qa

Ahli Bank QSC is a Qatari-based bank with its head office in Doha, Qatar.

== History ==
Founded in 1983 Ahli Bank QSC is a Qatari-owned financial institution that serves individual consumers, small businesses and corporate customers with a range of Corporate Banking, Retail & Private Banking, Treasury & Investments, International Banking and Brokerage Services. Citigroup decided to cease its operations from Qatar in 1987, allowing Ahli Bank to purchase all of its assets and start operating as an autonomous entity.

Ahli United Bank, Bahrain's largest bank, was the largest shareholder in Ahli Bank. In 2012, Ahli United sold all but 1,000 shares of its stake in the bank. At the time, Ahli Bank was considered the seventh-largest bank in Qatar.
