= Zarai Taraqiati Bank Limited =

Pakistani government-owned bank

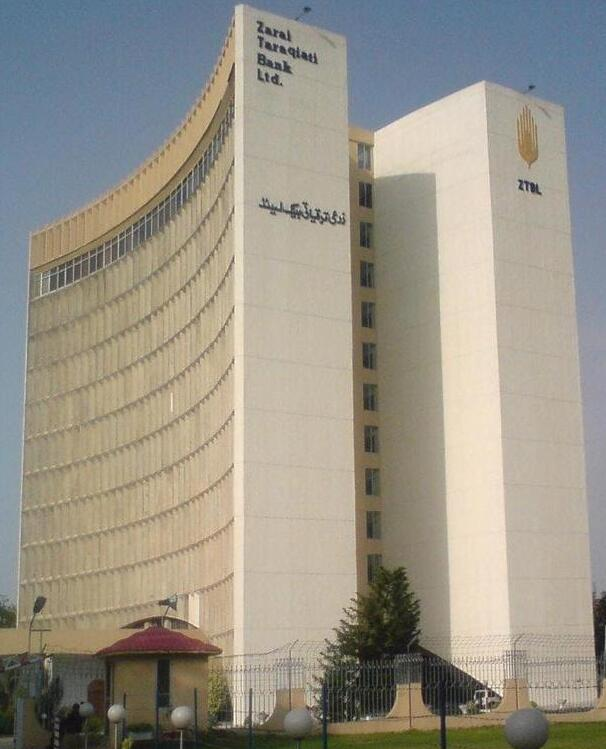
- Zarai Taraqiati Bank Limited (ZTBL) headquarters in Islamabad
- Formerly: Agricultural Development Bank of Pakistan (1961–2002)
- Company type: Unlisted public company
- Industry: Banking
- Founded: 1961; 65 years ago
- Headquarters: Islamabad-44000, Pakistan
- Area served: Pakistan
- Key people: Tahir Yaqoob Bhatti (CEO)
- Products: Agricultural loans
- Revenue: ▲ Rs. 16.055 billion (US$57 million) (2022)
- Operating income: ▲ Rs. 7.536 billion (US$27 million) (2022)
- Net income: ▲ Rs. 5.177 billion (US$19 million) (2022)
- Total assets: ▲ Rs. 491.177 billion (US$1.8 billion) (2022)
- Total equity: ▲ Rs. 60.624 billion (US$220 million) (2022)
- Owner: State Bank of Pakistan (76.23%); Government of Pakistan (23.75%)
- Number of employees: 5,500
- Parent: State Bank of Pakistan
- Website: ztbl.com.pk
- Footnotes / references Financials as of 31 December 2022

The Zarai Taraqiati Bank Limited (ZTBL) (Urdu: زرعی ترقیاتی بینک; lit. 'Agricultural Development Bank') is a Pakistani state-owned agricultural development bank headquartered in Islamabad.

Founded in 1961 as ADBP, the bank was renamed in 2002 as Zarai Taraqiati Bank Limited (ZTBL) and was subsequently incorporated as a public limited company in 2002 under Companies Ordinance 1984.

The bank provides agricultural credit and banking services to farmers across the country. It remains the largest public sector agriculture development financial institution in the country.

== History ==
Zarai Taraqiati Bank's history goes back to 1952 when Agricultural Development Finance Corporation was founded under a Central Act for the purpose of expanding financial facilities and promoting the development and modernisation of agriculture in Pakistan. In 1957, the Agricultural Bank of Pakistan was established and advanced both short and long-term loans. It commenced operations in January 1959 in East Pakistan and in April 1959 in West Pakistan, following exemptions from certain restrictive Provincial Debt Laws. Subsequently, the Agricultural Development Bank Ordinance was enacted on 18 February 1961. It facilitated the merger of the Agricultural Development Finance Corporation and the Agricultural Bank of Pakistan, based on recommendations from the Credit Enquiry Commission. By 1961, the 73 branches that the bank operated included 38 in West Pakistan and 35 in East Pakistan.

On 14 December 2002, the Government of Pakistan renamed the Agricultural Development Bank of Pakistan (ADBP) as Zarai Taraqiati Bank Ltd (ZTBL). ZTBL was registered under the Companies Ordinance 1984, and all assets, liabilities, and proceedings of the former were transferred to and vested in the ZTBL with effect from 14 December 2002.
