= Myanma Agricultural Development Bank =

Government bank in Myanmar

- Native name: မြန်မာ့လယ်ယာဖွံ့ဖြိုးရေးဘဏ်
- Company type: State-owned enterprise
- Founded: 1953; 73 years ago
- Headquarters: Yangon, Myanmar
- Products: Banking
- Parent: Ministry of Agriculture and Irrigation

The Myanma Agricultural Development Bank (Burmese: မြန်မာ့လယ်ယာဖွံ့ဖြိုးရေးဘဏ်; abbreviated MADB) is a government-owned bank specialized in providing financial services to agricultural enterprises in Myanmar (Burma), and is the largest financial institution of its kind in the country. The bank is owned and operated by the Ministry of Agriculture and Irrigation (MAI), and has 206 branches nationwide. MADB provides loans to a sizable number of rural households, serving 1.87 million customers in 2012. MADB loan products typically cover farmers' short-term working capital needs (e.g., purchase of seeds, fertilizers, and pesticides; payment of salaries for farm workers; and lease of agriculture equipment).

== History ==
MADB was first established as the National Agricultural Bank (နိုင်ငံတော်စိုက်ပျိုးရေးဘဏ်) in June 1953 by the Burmese government to support the development of agriculture, livestock, and rural enterprises in Myanmar. Its immediate predecessor, the Myanma Agricultural Bank, was established in 1976, an offshoot of the Agricultural Finance division of the People's Bank. MAB was renamed in 1990, and was reconstituted in 1997 under the Myanma Agricultural Development Bank Law.

== Headquarters ==
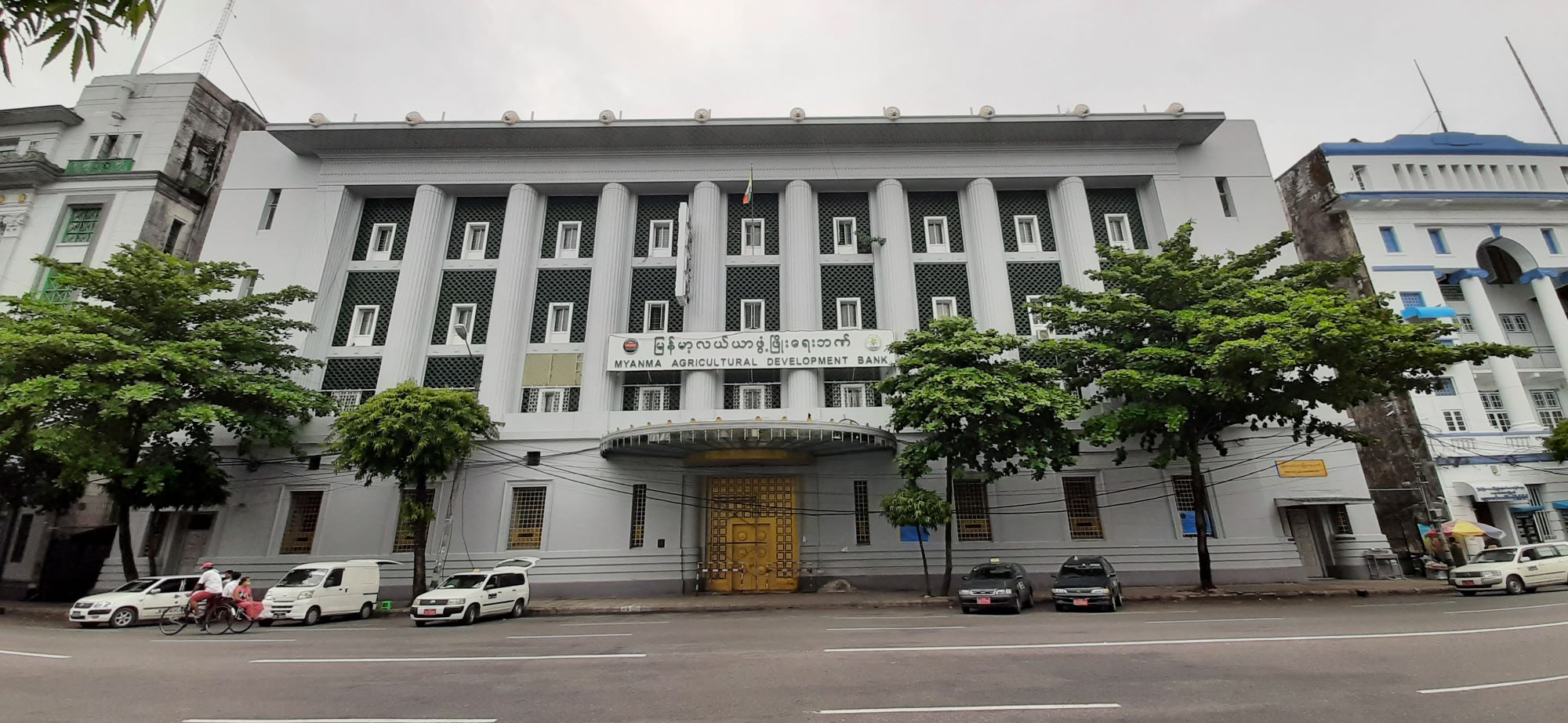
MADB's headquarters that previously housed the Rangoon branch of the National Bank of India, Grindlays Bank, People's Bank No. 11 and National Museum of Burma

MADB's headquarters have been located on Pansodan Street in downtown Yangon, Myanmar since 1996, occupying a colonial-era landmark that previously housed the Rangoon branch of the National Bank of India. The building was completed in 1930, designed by Thomas Oliphant Foster and Basil Ward; the former architect designed the Myanma Port Authority building. In the 1940s, Grindlays Bank acquired the building. With the Burmese Way to Socialism, the bank was nationalized and converted into People's Bank No. 11 in 1963. From 1970 to 1996, the building housed the National Museum of Myanmar (Yangon).

== See also ==
- List of banks in Myanmar
