= National Bank of Bahrain =

Bank in Bahrain

- Type: Public
- Traded as: BHSE:NBB
- Industry: Banking; Financial services Investment services
- Founded: 1957; 69 years ago
- Headquarters: Manama, Bahrain
- Area served: Bahrain
- Key people: Hala Ali Hussain Yateem (Chairperson)
- Products: Finance and insurance Consumer Banking; Corporate Banking; Investment Banking; Investment Management; Global Wealth Management; Private Equity; Mortgages; Credit Cards
- Revenue: ▲$277.84 million (2017)
- Operating income: ▲$190.10 million (2017)
- Net income: ▲$162.25 million (2017)
- Total assets: ▲BD5.97 billion (US$15.8 billion) (first half of 2025)
- Total equity: ▲$1.191 billion (2017)
- Number of employees: 761
- Website: NBBOnline.com

National Bank of Bahrain (NBB) is a Bahraini public shareholding bank that provides retail and wholesale commercial banking services, treasury and investment activities, and investment advisory services. The bank is licensed by the Central Bank of Bahrain as a conventional retail bank and is headquartered in Manama, Bahrain. Its shares are listed on the Bahrain Bourse. It has overseas branches in Abu Dhabi and Riyadh.

== History ==
The bank was incorporated in January 1957 by an Amiri decree in the Kingdom of Bahrain. NBB states that it was established as Bahrain's first locally owned bank.

In January 2020, NBB announced the successful completion of its offer to acquire up to 100% of the issued ordinary shares of Bahrain Islamic Bank, increasing its holding to 78.8% from a pre-transaction stake of 29.06%.

In June 2024, NBB appointed Goldman Sachs as financial adviser for a potential merger with Bank of Bahrain and Kuwait (BBK). On 2 November 2025, the two banks signed a memorandum of understanding to advance the merger talks.

In the first half of 2025, the bank's assets grew 8% year on year to BD5.97 billion (US$15.8 billion).

== Ownership ==
Bahrain Mumtalakat Holding Company (Bahrain) 49%, The Pension Fund Commission (Bahrain) 6.24%.
