= Banco San Juan =

Rural Bank of San Juan, Inc.
- Company type: Private
- Industry: Finance and Insurance
- Founded: San Juan, Philippines (1953)
- Headquarters: Makati, Philippines
- Key people: Oscar Inocentes, Chairman; Jobel G. Chua, President and CEO
- Products: Financial services
- Net income: unknown
- Number of employees: 250

Banco San Juan, formally known as the Rural Bank of San Juan, is one of the largest rural banks in the Philippines, ranking second in terms of resources. The bank is headquartered in Makati, Metro Manila. It has the distinction for being the first rural bank to join an interbank network, namely BancNet, and the rural bank with the largest branch network on the island of Luzon. The bank was founded in 1953. Prior to its acquisition, the bank has at least 30 branches in Metro Manila and Luzon.

On May 28, 2011, it was announced that Banco San Juan was to be acquired by Banco de Oro Universal Bank. The acquisition was formalized in May 2012 after the Bangko Sentral ng Pilipinas (BSP) let the transaction proceed. By May 2023 BSP has closed down its branch in Southern Leyte.
