= House Building Finance Company =

Subsidiary of State Bank of Pakistan

House Building Finance Company Limited
- Formerly: House Building Finance Corporation
- Type: Government
- Industry: Financial services
- Founded: 1951; 75 years ago
- Headquarters: Karachi, Sindh, Pakistan
- Number of locations: 51
- Key people: Imran Ahad (MD)
- Products: Housing Finance; Home construction loan; Home extension and renovation loan
- Revenue: ▼ Rs. 2,424,288,000 (2021)
- Operating income: ▼ Rs. (1,520,051,000) (2021)
- Net income: ▼ Rs. 986,154,000 (2021)
- Total assets: ▼ Rs. 22,449,515,000 (2021)
- Parent: State Bank of Pakistan
- Website: hbfc.com.pk

House Building Finance Company Limited (HBFCL), formerly known as House Building Finance Corporation (HBFC), is a Pakistani housing finance company which is a subsidiary of State Bank of Pakistan. Founded in 1952, it is based in Karachi, Pakistan.

== History ==
House Building Finance Company was founded in 1951. Before the independence of East Pakistan, it was headquartered in Dacca. It was incorporated as a corporation on 25 July 2007 and is jointly owned by the State Bank of Pakistan (90.31 percent) and Government of Pakistan (9.69 percent). On 18 February 2011, the name of House Building Finance Corporation was changed to House Building Finance Company Limited under section 39 of the Companies Ordinance 1984.

The company is now an unlisted public limited company. The company has 51 branches, 7 area offices, 3 regional offices, and head office based in Karachi.

== Privatization ==
The Cabinet Committee on Privatisation (CCoP) approved transaction structures for the privatization of House Building Finance Company Ltd.

== Products and services ==
- Ghar Pakistan Scheme (GPS), a housing financing scheme for midlevel income persons
- Ghar Pakistan Plus Scheme (GPS Plus), a special scheme for construction of house with higher income persons
- Ghar Sahulat Scheme (GSS), a scheme is used for house purchasing or construction.
- HBFC Khaas, a special scheme for widows, children of martyrs of special forces, special persons, transgender people
- Mera Pakistan Mera Ghar Scheme, a government's markup subsidise scheme.
- Ghar Ujala Scheme, a home solar system scheme from 3KW to 20KW up to 10 years.
- Ghar Ujala Scheme, a home solar system scheme from 3KW to 20KW up to 05 years.
- Ghar Ujala Scheme, a home solar system scheme from 3KW to 20KW up to 10 years.
