= First Microfinance Bank =

First Microfinance Bank may refer to:

- First MicroFinance Bank-Afghanistan
- First MicroFinance Bank-Pakistan
- First MicroFinance Bank-Tajikistan
