= TMBThanachart Bank =

Thai bank

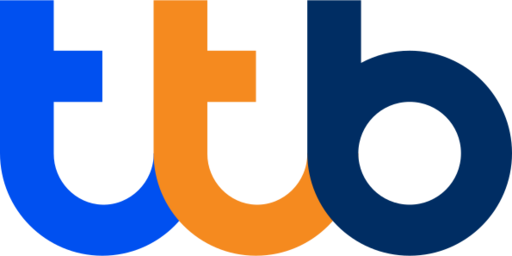
- Native name: ธนาคารทหารไทยธนชาต
- Company type: Public
- Traded as: SET: TTB
- ISIN: TH0068010Z07
- Industry: Financial services
- Founded: 8 November 1957; 68 years ago
- Headquarters: Chatuchak, Bangkok, Thailand
- Area served: Thailand, Laos
- Key people: Rungson Sriworasat (Chairman); Mr.Sornnarin Mahaprom (CEO)
- Products: Transactional banking focused, banking services
- Revenue: ▲48,555 million baht (2023)
- Net income: ▲11,601 million baht (2023)
- Total assets: ▲891,713 million baht (2023)
- Number of employees: 8,373 (2018)
- Website: www.ttbbank.com

TMBThanachart Bank (TTB) (Thai: ธนาคารทหารไทยธนชาต จำกัด (มหาชน); [Thai Military Thanachart Bank] RTGS: thanakhan thahan thai thanachat chamkat maha chon) (Note: Formal registered name in English is "TMB Bank, TMB") is a Thai bank based in Bangkok. It has been listed on the Stock Exchange of Thailand (SET) since 23 December 1983. Piti Tantakasem was appointed CEO effective January 2018.

As of 2019, TMB was the nation's seventh largest bank with assets of 892 billion baht. As of 2018, TMB reported 48,555 million baht in revenues, income of 11,601 million baht, and total assets of 891,713 million baht. In 2018 TMB reported 8,373 employees, 416 branches, and 2,891 ATMs. As of 2025 TMB reported having more than 10 million customers.

== History ==
TMB was the brainchild of Field Marshall Sarit Thanarat. He endeavoured to establish a commercial banking business to provide financial services exclusively to military personnel under the Commercial Banking Act B.E. 2488 (1945). The bank started in 1957, but only opened its first branch, Ratchaprasong Branch, in Bangkok in 1963.

In 1973 it became a full commercial bank with the general public as its customer base. It adopted the slogan, "Thai Military Bank, the Bank for all people". In 2005, TMB adopted the new official name in English, "TMB Bank Public Company Limited", a new corporate logo, and a new slogan, "Better Partner, Better Value".

In 2014, TTB set up FAI-FAH as its main corporate social responsibility programme. FAI-FAH was a learning centre where free courses in cooking, painting, singing, dancing and other subjects are offered to low-income teenagers. The bank created two FAI-FAH centres. Many of the children who have been trained by the center have returned to their communities and initiated community development programme aided by ttb staffers who work as volunteers.

=== Merger with Thanachart Bank 2019 ===
In 2019, TMB Bank agreed to merge with Thanachart Bank, a retail bank in Thailand, which would make TMBThanachart the sixth largest bank in Thailand. The merger completed in July 2021. Initially, TMBThanachart will have 91 branches, 58 in Bangkok and 33 in the provinces. Praphan Anupongongarch was President of the combined TMBThanachart Bank.

By 2023, the bank had 560 conventional bank branches and announced a plan to convert 5-10 branches in Bangkok to paperless and cashless branches.

== Management ==
Key management as of April 2024:

- Mr. Piti Tantakasem, Chief Executive Officer
- Mr. Thakorn Piyapan, President
- Mr. Somkid Preechasammakul, Chief Financial Officer

== Shareholders ==
Major shareholders as of 7 March 2023:

- THANACHART Capital PLC: 24.31%
- ING Bank N.V.: 22.85%
- Thai Ministry of Finance: 11.70%
- Thai NDVR: 5.80%

== Recognition ==
On 14 April 2015, The Asian Banker Leadership Achievement Awards presented the "Best CEO in Asia Pacific 2015" award to Boontuck Wungcharoen, TMB CEO, and the "Best Managed Bank in Asia Pacific" award to TMB. The award ceremony took place during the Asian Banker Summit in Hong Kong. Both Boontuck and TMB are the first from Thailand to receive the accolade.

In its announcement of the awards, the Asian Banker said, "...the bank has changed from a loss-making institution to a profitable one. Its net profit in 2014 rose by 66.2%—the highest among Thai banks. Net profit improved five-fold from, 2009-2014 while asset quality improved. Non-performing loan ratios dropped from 12.7% in 2009 to 2.9% in 2014 and cost-to-income ratios decreased from 77% in 2009 to 53% in 2014."

Mr. Boontuck was also named "Financier of the Year 2014" by Money and Banking magazine.
