= Golden Star Bank =

North Korean bank

Coordinates: 48°11′51″N 16°20′29″E

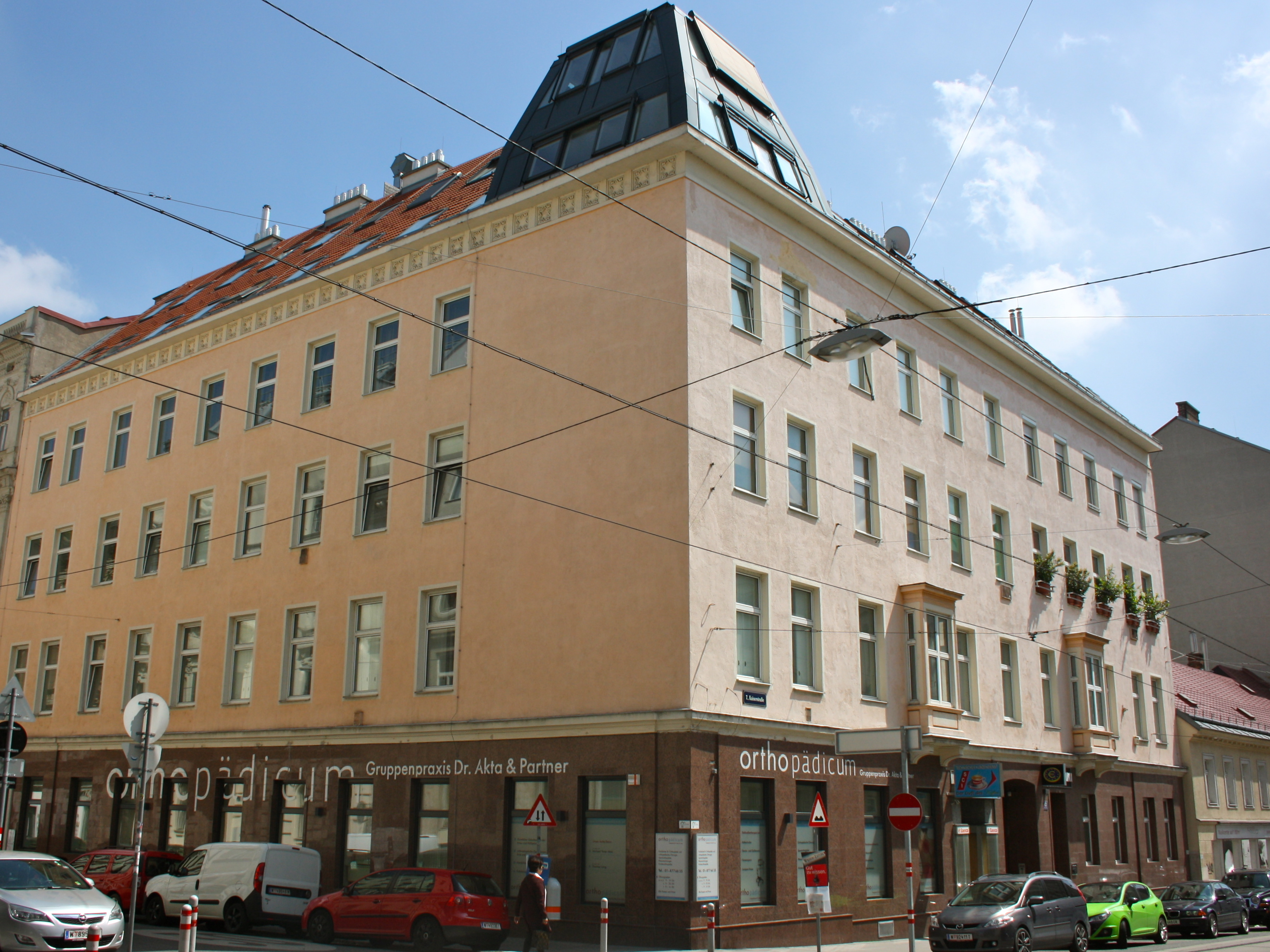
Kaiserstraße

The Golden Star Bank was a North Korean bank in Vienna, Austria, that operated from 1982 to 2004. It was the last North Korean bank in Europe at the time of its closure. It was forcibly closed in 2004 due to allegations of money laundering and funding North Korean weapons.

== History ==
Golden Star Bank, a subsidiary of Taesong Bank, was opened in Vienna, Austria in 1982. The bank was housed in a five-story building that was 800 square metres in size and located in Neubau, the seventh district of Vienna. It was only allowed to perform limited transaction like exchanging foreign currencies and keeping accounts for North Korean citizens or companies. At one point, it was North Korea's only bank abroad. It was North Korea's main financial hub in Europe.

Funding for Shin Sang-ok's films while he worked for North Korea was sent through the Golden Star Bank in the form of remittances.

The Illicit Activities Initiative of the United States Department of State targeted the Golden Star Bank. In 2002, Slovak authorities raided the apartment of a North Korean couple in Bratislava. They discovered millions of dollars in invoices showing that North Korea sold missile technology to Egypt. This discovery led to increase scrutiny of the Golden Star Bank. The bank was closed in June 2004 amid suspicions of money laundering and the funding of North Korean arms, although there was not enough evidence to start a criminal trial. It was the last North Korean bank in Europe when it closed.

== See also ==
- Banco Delta Asia
- List of banks in Austria

== Works cited ==
=== Books ===
- Hastings, Justin (2016). A Most Enterprising Country: North Korea in the Global Economy. Cornell University Press. ISBN 9781501704901.

=== Journals ===
- Wertz, Daniel (2013). "The Evolution of Financial Sanctions on North Korea". North Korean Review. 9 (2). McFarland & Company: 69–82. doi:10.2307/43908921. JSTOR 43908921.

=== News ===
- "N Korea's only bank in Europe to close". The Sydney Morning Herald. 1 April 2004. Archived from the original on 3 May 2025.
- "Rumors Reappear with South Korea Couple". The New York Times. 23 March 1986. Archived from the original on 24 May 2015.
- Burgermeister, Jane (26 July 2003). "North Korean bank is 'front for arms trade'". The Sydney Morning Herald. Archived from the original on 29 December 2024.
- Hyung-Eun, Kim (10 November 2010). "Defector Finds Niche in South". The New York Times. Archived from the original on 3 February 2018.
- Leidig, Michael (23 July 2003). "Austria accuses North Korean bank of being spy HQ". The Daily Telegraph. p. 27 – via Newspapers.com.
- Nardelli, Alberto; Lee, Jeong-Ho (5 December 2020). "For North Korean spies, Vienna provides key gateway to Europe". The Boston Globe. Archived from the original on 5 December 2020.
- Rose, David (5 August 2009). "North Korea's Dollar Store". The New York Times. Archived from the original on 8 September 2026.
