= Orient Commercial Joint Stock Bank =

Vietnamese bank

Orient Commercial Joint Stock Bank (OCB)
- Native name: Ngân hàng Thương mại Cổ phần Phương Đông; Ngân hàng Phương Đông
- Type: Private
- Traded as: HOSE: OCB
- Industry: Financial services
- Founded: June 10, 1996
- Headquarters: The Hallmark Tower, 15 Trần Bạch Đằng Boulevard, Thủ Thiêm, Thủ Đức, Ho Chi Minh City, Vietnam
- Area served: Vietnam
- Key people: Trinh Van Tuan, Chairman of the BOD
- Products: Deposits services, Loans services, Remittance services, Account service, International settlement
- Number of employees: 1,539
- Website: www.ocb.com.vn/vi

The Orient Commercial Joint Stock Bank (also known as Oricombank and OCB, Vietnamese: Ngân hàng Phương Đông) is a joint-stock commercial bank state-owned (100%) government by the Vietnam National Hydrometeorological Administration under the Ministry of Natural Resources and Environment (now Ministry of Agriculture and Environment in Vietnam. Its Swift code is ORCOVNVX.

== History ==
OCB was established on June 10, 1996 in Ho Chi Minh City. In the early years of its establishment, OCB focused on developing retail banking services, such as deposit mobilization, lending, payment, card services, etc.. OCB also expanded its operating network to many provinces and cities across the country.

From 2000 onwards, OCB began to grow rapidly. The bank has developed more modern banking products and services, such as online banking, mobile banking, etc. OCB also invested heavily in information technology and human resource development.

In 2008, OCB was granted a license by the State Bank of Vietnam to establish Phương Đông Securities Company (OCB Securities). On August 26, 2009 OCB agreed to increase steadily share ownership for BNP Paribas from 10% to 15% and to 20% after the approval of the State Bank of Vietnam and the Government. In December 2017, BNP Paribas has sold all 74.7 million shares in OCB and is no longer a shareholder.

In 2018, OCB was recognized by the State Bank of Vietnam for successfully completing the implementation of Basel II. Basel II is an international set of standards for bank risk management. In January 2020, Aozora Bank of Japan purchased a 15% stake in OCB.

In 2021, OCB was officially listed on the Ho Chi Minh City Stock Exchange (HOSE).

== See also ==
- List of banks in Vietnam
