= Taesong Bank =

Korea Taesong Bank
- Native name: 조선대성은행
- Industry: Bank
- Headquarters: Segori-dong, Gyongheung St., Potonggang District, Pyongyang, North Korea

Korean name
- Chosŏn'gŭl: 대성은행
- Hancha: 大成銀行
- Revised Romanization: Daeseong eunhaeng
- McCune–Reischauer: Taesŏng ŭnhaeng

Korea Taesong Bank (Korean: 조선 대성 은행; sometimes called Daesong Bank, Dae-Sung Bank or Taesong General Trading Corporation; in Japan called Chosun Tae Seong-Unhan; Tae-bank, Choson Taesong Unhaeng) is a North Korean financial institution.

The Korea Taesong Bank is reportedly controlled by Room 39.

The Golden Star Bank, founded as a corporation in Vienna, Austria, was the only North Korean bank in Europe but was closed in 2004; it was a subsidiary of the Taesong Bank. Kwon Yong-nok was an auditor of the Golden Star Bank.

"Taesong Bank, which received remittances from Mt. Kumgang tourism, is controlled by Room 39, and is also in charge of the exports of agricultural and fisheries products."

== Projects ==
- In 1989, it was to jointly develop the area around Mount Kumgang, on the eastern coast of North Korea, as a tourist site with Hyundai.
- The company has been implicated in the smuggling of arms into and out of North Korea and "Involved in facilitating proliferation financing projects."

=== Members ===
- In 1989, Choe Su-gil was president of the Taesong Bank of North Korea and consultant to the Korean Association for the Promotion of Asian Trade.
- In 2014, Kim Yo-jong took control of Taesong Bank, the Reunification and Development Bank, and a number of tourism and railway projects.
- In 2014, Yun Tae-hyong, a regional manager in the Russian Far East for the Taesong Bank, defected while in Russia according to South Korean media. He reportedly took $5 million USD with him, and was seeking asylum in a third country.
