= Blåsuts BK =

- City: Vänersborg, Sweden
- League: Division 1
- Division: Västra
- Founded: 1932; 93 years ago

Blåsuts Bandyklubb, Blåsut BK, is a bandy club in Vänersborg, Sweden. The team colours are yellow and blue. The club was founded on 21 November 1932 (even if the present organisation wasn't formally registered until 1991).

The club was promoted to Allsvenskan, the second level bandy league in Sweden, in 2008, relegated to Division 1 again the next year, but was again promoted for the 2010/11 season, and has as of 2014 stayed there since then.
