= Central Bank of the Democratic People's Republic of Korea =

Central bank of North Korea

Central Bank of the Democratic People's Republic of Korea 조선민주주의인민공화국 중앙은행

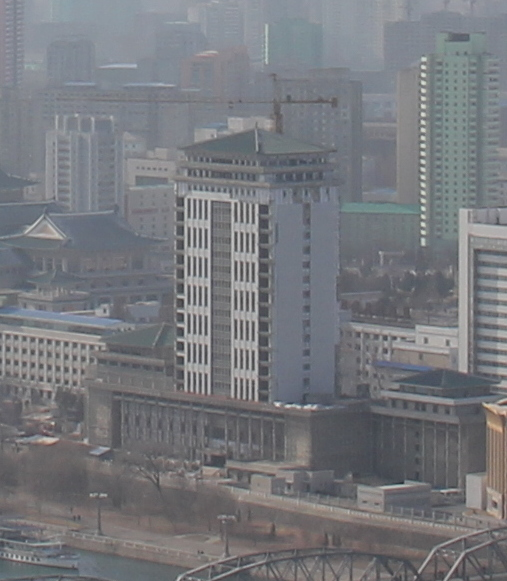
- Central bank of: Democratic People's Republic of Korea
- Headquarters: 58-1 Mansu Dong, Sungri Street, Central District, Pyongyang
- Coordinates: 39.0113°N 125.7531°E
- Established: 1947
- President: Paek Min Gwang
- Currency: North Korean won KPW (ISO 4217)

- Central Bank of the Democratic People's Republic of Korea
- Hangul: 조선민주주의인민공화국 중앙은행
- Hanja: 朝鮮民主主義人民共和國中央銀行
- RR: Joseon minjujuui inmin gonghwaguk jungangeunhaeng
- MR: Chosŏn minjujuŭi inmin konghwaguk chungangŭnhaeng

The Central Bank of the Democratic People's Republic of Korea is the central bank of North Korea. Established on December 6, 1947, it issues the North Korean won. The bank is subordinated to the Cabinet of North Korea.

Since 2023, the president of the bank has been Paek Min Gwang. The bank served as the de facto commercial bank of North Korea before Kim Jong-un assumed the power, when financial and banking reforms separated the central bank from commercial functions.

== History ==
In December 1945, the Pyongyang branch of the Bank of Chōsen created a temporary monetary office, known as the "calculation office". On 9 January 1946, the central bank of North Korea was created with use of all branches of the Bank of Chōsen on North Korean territory. In practice, that central bank was under the control of the Soviet Armed Forces. It was complemented in April 1946 by the creation of a Farmers' Bank. However, the Soviet-controlled central bank failed to accomplish its objectives, being unable to meet its costs of operation, and its 100 million wŏn capitalisation proved to be insufficient, and the North Korean Interim People's Committee opted to work mainly through the Farmers' Bank.

On 29 October 1946, the system was reorganized. 58 local banks were merged into the central bank, including North Korean operations of Japanese-era Korean banks headquartered in Seoul such as Chōsen Commercial Bank, Chōsen Savings Bank, or Chōsen Trust. Simultaneously, control of the central bank was taken over from the Soviet forces by the North Korean government through its finance ministry. By 1947, the Central Bank and Farmers' Bank were the only two credit institutions in the country and together formed its single-tier banking system in line with the Soviet model. In June 1947, around 1,000 million wŏn was concentrated in the Central Bank, allowing it to extend credits totalling 900 million wŏn for economic rehabilitation. The consolidation reflected a return to the original objectives of the People's Committee, which desired tight control over the North Korean economy. Any bank employees opposed to the changes within the system were removed from their posts. On 6 December 1947, a comprehensive program of currency reform was announced.

In 1959, the Farmers' Bank was merged into the Central Bank of the Democratic People's Republic of Korea, and the Foreign Trade Bank was established to handle the Central Bank's international business. Further state banks to deal with foreign exchange operations were created between 1987 and 1996.

In 2011, the Central Bank building was torn down to make way for the newly constructed Mansudae/Changjon Street Area in celebration of Kim Il Sung's 100th birthday anniversary. The new site of the Central Bank building is located in the Ot'an-dong division of Chung-guyok.

== Organization ==
The Central Bank has over 220 branches. It operates the Chŏnsŏng electronic cash card.

== Presidents ==
Name	Took office	Left office	Notes
Kim Kyo-yong	1953	1956-?	
Chong Song-on	1959	1962-?	
Pyon Song-u	1969	1988	
Chong Song-taek	1988	2000	Jong Song-thaek, born 1930
Kim Wan-su	2000	2009	
Ri Kwang-gon	2009	2010–?	
Paek Ryong-chon	2011	2014	
Kim Chon-gyun	2014	2021	
Chae Song-hak	2021	2023	
Paek Min Gwang	2023	Incumbent	

== See also ==
- Ministry of Finance (North Korea)
- List of banks in North Korea
- List of central banks
