= Companies Ordinance 1984 =

Piece of Pakistani legislation

The corporate sector in Pakistan was governed by the Companies Ordinance 1984 which was promulgated on 8 October 1984 and repealed the Indian Companies Act, 1913. It is now replaced by Companies Ordinance 2016.

The Companies Ordinance 1984 is a broad piece of Pakistani legislation that, according to its own preamble, is "An Ordinance to consolidate and amend the law relating to companies and certain other associations". It encompasses all legal rules and regulations for businesses registered with Security and Exchange Commission of Pakistan (SECP) and is enforced by that agency.

== Introduction ==
A company is a corporation. In the eye of law, it is a person which is different from its members. As company is person in the eye of law, it can own property. It can have rights and it can also be subject to the liabilities. A company is not agent of its members. The company cannot sue the members in case of liabilities and members of the company cannot sue it to enforce rights.

== Main Point of difference between Public and Private Company ==
1. Relevant statute:
- Private company: Private company has following restriction while these restrictions does not apply to other companies.
  1. It cannot have members more than 50 excluding those are the employees of the company
  2. It cannot invite the general public to subscribe the share of the company
  3. It restricts freely transfer of share
- Public company: Companies Ordinance define the public company as a company that is not a private company. It means every company that is registered in Pakistan either it is a private company or a public company.

The Ordinance also provides legal protection and regulates the business community of Pakistan, with the SECP keeping a close check on financial and corporate entities to insure stakeholder's interest.

The previous Indian Companies Act 1913 was in practice for the same purposes.

== Sources ==
- "The Companies Ordinance, 1984" (PDF). SECP. Archived from the original (PDF) on 11 May 2012.
