= Myanma Foreign Trade Bank =

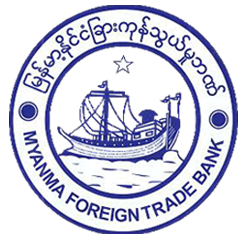
- Native name: မြန်မာ့နိုင်ငံခြားကုန်သွယ်မှုဘဏ်
- Industry: Banking
- Predecessor: State Commercial Bank (1954)
- Founded: July 4, 1990
- Headquarters: No. 80-86, Mahabandoola Garden Street, Kyauktada Township, Yangon, Myanmar
- Website: www.mmftb.gov.mm

The Myanma Foreign Trade Bank (Burmese: မြန်မာ့နိုင်ငံခြားကုန်သွယ်မှုဘဏ်; abbreviated MFTB) is a state-owned bank specializing in foreign banking. It provides trade finance and foreign exchange-related banking to the government, state enterprises, and the international community residing in Myanmar. MFTB also manages Burma's official foreign currency reserves. Until recent economic reforms, MFTB had a monopoly on foreign exchange and related customer base.

The bank was established under the Financial Institutions of Myanmar Law of 1990.
