= Foreign Trade Bank of the Democratic People's Republic of Korea =

North Korean bank

- Type: Bank
- Industry: Foreign-exchange reserves
- Founded: 1959; 67 years ago
- Headquarters: FTB Building, Jungsong-dong, Seungri Street, Central District, Pyongyang, North Korea
- Key people: O Kwang-chol (President)
- Owner: Government of North Korea

Korean name
- Chosŏn'gŭl: 조선무역은행
- Hancha: 朝鮮貿易銀行
- Revised Romanization: Joseon muyeog eunhaeng
- McCune–Reischauer: Chosŏn muyŏk ŭnhaeng

The Foreign Trade Bank of the Democratic People's Republic of Korea (Joson Trade Bank) is North Korea's primary foreign exchange bank, and is owned and run by the North Korean government.

== History ==
It was established in November 1959. It performs foreign trade settlement and foreign exchange operations, and plays a role in determining and announcing exchange rates and guaranteeing payments for trade organizations. It was in charge of issuing 'foreign currency exchange certificates', a type of convertible note issued by North Korea since 1979, starting in 1988, but officially abolished the convertible note system after July 1, 2002.

O Kwang-chol, who served as the president of the Trade Bank of the Democratic People's Republic of Korea, is believed to have received training for several months at foreign financial institutions, investment companies, and private companies, and participated in the United Nations Conference on Trade and Development held in Geneva, Switzerland in June 2005 and the Financial Working Group Meeting with the United States held on December 19, 2006. Representative Han Jang-su served as the head of the Moscow branch of the Foreign Trade Bank of the Democratic People's Republic of Korea.

On March 11, 2013, the United States designated the bank as falling under US executive order 13382, which applies to "proliferators of weapons of mass destruction and their supporters". The order freezes all assets, and prohibits any transactions between US entities and the bank.

On May 7, 2013, the state-controlled Bank of China announced that they would stop all dealings with the Foreign Trade Bank. China has in the past been reluctant to sanction North Korea, even though China has been very unsatisfied with North Korea's aggressive stance and pursuit of nuclear weapons. Stopping the dealing with the Foreign Trade Bank is seen as a significant signal by China to put pressure on North Korea.

On August 5, 2017 the UN Security Council adopted Resolution 2371 expanding financial sanctions to include the bank.

After UN Security Council Resolution 2094 was adopted in March 2013, several Chinese banks will not deal with the Foreign Trade Bank.

The United States Department of the Treasury has designated Dandong Zhongsheng Industry & Trade Co Ltd and Korea Ungum Corporation as FTB front companies, and sanctioned the Moscow-based Agrosoyuz Commercial Bank for facilitating transactions for the FTB.

== See also ==
- Central Bank of the Democratic People's Republic of Korea
- Ministry of External Economic Relations
- Economy of North Korea
