= Bank of Bahrain and Kuwait =

Government bank

Bank of Bahrain and Kuwait B.S.C (BBK)
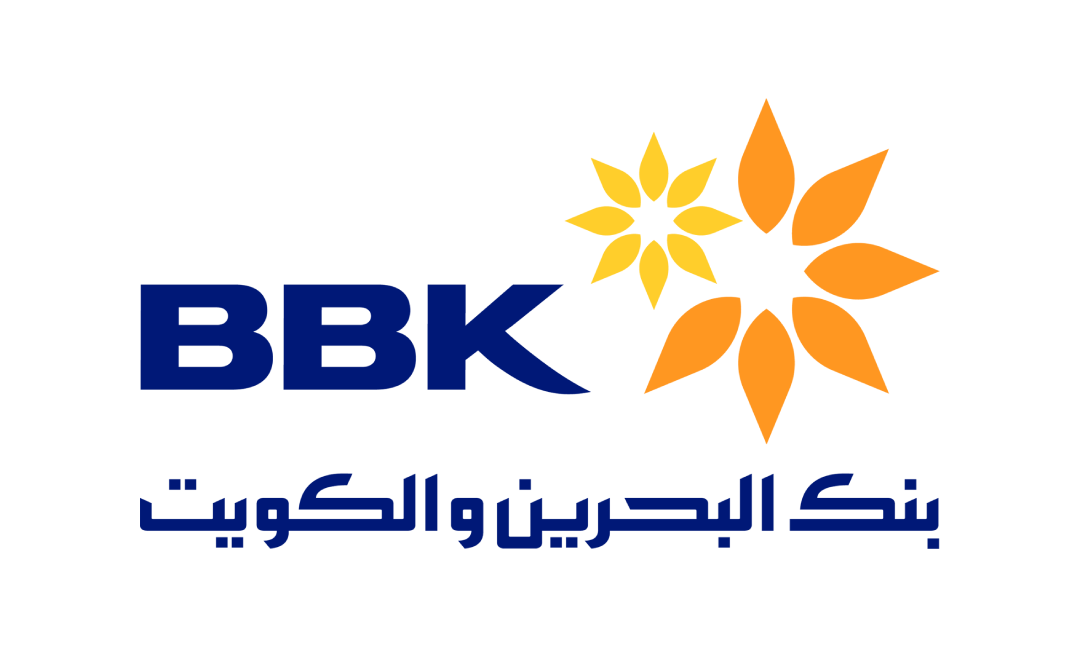
- BBK Logo
- Company type: Financial
- Traded as: BHSE:BBK
- Industry: Banking; Financial services Investment services
- Founded: 16 March 1971; 55 years ago
- Headquarters: Manama, Bahrain
- Area served: Bahrain and Kuwait (retail and corporate banking); UAE and India (corporate banking only), Turkey
- Key people: Tariq Jaleel AlSaffar (Chairperson); Yaser Alsharifi (CEO)
- Products: Finance and insurance Consumer Banking; Corporate Banking; Investment Banking; Investment Management; Global Wealth Management; Private Equity; Mortgages; Credit Cards
- Operating income: BD 161.2 million (2024)
- Net income: BD 72.000 million (2024)
- Total assets: BD 4.193 billion (2024)
- Total equity: BD 624 million (2024)
- Number of employees: 1,261 (2024)
- Subsidiaries: CrediMax, Invita
- Website: www.bbkonline.com

The Bank of Bahrain and Kuwait (BBK) was established on 16 March 1971 in both the Kingdom of Bahrain and the State of Kuwait. Its shareholders consist of the public, the government of Bahrain, banks and investment companies in Kuwait. BBK engages in the provision of various services and banking products throughout its branches in Bahrain, Kuwait and India as well as its representative office in Dubai, United Arab Emirates.

== Operations ==
The BBK is split into four major segments: Retail Banking deals with individual customers through e-banking, loans, multi-feature accounts, credit facilities etc.; Treasury and Investment which handles internal consults with the various departments and affiliated companies to handle capital management; Corporate Banking focuses on corporate and institutional customers within Bahrain; and International Banking works with overseas corporates and institutional customers, with branches in India, representative offices in Turkey and Dubai, and global correspondence with larger banks, to manage overseas trading, money marketing plus funding operations.

== Shareholders ==
- Fincorp W.L.L 26.19%
- Social Insurance Organisation (SIO) 32.97%
- Kuwait Investment Authority 19.20%
- Public 21.64%

== Subsidiaries ==
Subsidiaries of the BBK include: CrediMax which specialises in credit card issuing; Capinnova Investment Bank, a Sharia compliant investment banking division of the BBK which works with the corporate finance and private equity departments; Invita is a call centre outsourcing subsidiary; Sakana, a joint venture between Capinnova and Ithmaar Bank, focusing on Islamic finance in the real estate sector; Global Payment Services (GPS), a branch of Credimax that specialises in processing and outsourcing business to local and overseas clients.
