= List of state enterprises of Thailand =

As of October 2017, the Government of Thailand holds majority ownership in 56 commercial entities that are categorized as state-owned enterprises (SOEs). These include:

- Forty-six non-financial SOEs concentrated in key economic sectors such as communications, power generation and distribution, transportation, and water management. Several are among the largest listed companies in Thailand.
- Ten financial SOEs, including a state-owned bank, a government pawnshop, and eight specialized financial institutions (SFIs) that carry out high-profile policy functions.
- Since the military coup of 2014, there has been a sharp increase in active duty military officers sitting on the boards of state-owned enterprises. Of the 56 state-owned enterprises, 42 have military directors as of 2018.

== SOE financials ==
SOE total assets rose from 4.3 trillion baht (US$130 billion) in 2004 to 14.9 trillion baht (US$450.8 billion) in 2016. Revenues increased from 1.4 trillion baht to 4 trillion baht over the same period. As assets have risen, profits have fallen—from 304 billion baht in 2013 to 291 billion in 2016. SOEs contributed 162 billion baht (US$17.5 billion) in tax revenues in FY2016 (ending 30 September 2016). They employ 425,000 workers. The average return on assets for all SOEs in 2016 was 1.6 percent. SOE's total investment budget in FY2016 was 580 billion baht (US$17.5 billion) and is budgeted at 800 billion baht (US$24.2 billion) for FY2017.

=== 2017 results ===
Nearly all state enterprises delivered higher profits in 2017. The State Enterprise Policy Office (SEPO) reported that the top five state enterprises by contributions to Thai government coffers in 2017 were the Government Lottery Office (GLO) at 30.9 billion baht, PTT Public Company Limited (PTT) at 26.3 billion, the Electricity Generating Authority of Thailand (EGAT) at 21.7 billion, Government Savings Bank at 13.1 billion and the Provincial Electricity Authority (PEA) at 11.4 billion.

As of 2018 six underperforming state enterprises have been placed in "business rehabilitation" status by the State Enterprise Policy Commission. The six are the State Railway of Thailand, the Bangkok Mass Transit Authority, Thai Airways International PLC (THAI), TOT PLC, CAT Telecom, and the Islamic Bank of Thailand. (Thai Airways ceased to be a state enterprise in May 2020).

== List of state enterprises ==
As of 2018, the state enterprises of Thailand are as follows:

- Aeronautical Radio of Thailand, Ltd.
- Airports of Thailand Public Co., Ltd.
- Bangkok Mass Transit Authority
- Bank for Agriculture and Agricultural Co-operatives
- Botanical Garden Organization
- Civil Aviation Training Center
- Dairy Farming Promotion Organization of Thailand (DPO)
- Dhanarak Asset Development Co., Ltd
- Electricity Generating Authority of Thailand
- Export–Import Bank of Thailand
- Expressway Authority of Thailand
- Fish Marketing Organization
- Forest Industry Organization
- GH Bank
- Government Lottery Office
- Government Pharmaceutical Organization
- Government Savings Bank
- Industrial Estate Authority of Thailand
- Islamic Bank of Thailand
- Liquor Distillery Organization, Excise Department (Note: Not a legal person)
- Market Organization
- Marketing Organization for Farmers
- Mass Rapid Transit Authority of Thailand
- MCOT Public Co., Ltd.
- Metropolitan Electricity Authority
- Metropolitan Waterworks Authority
- National Housing Authority
- National Science Museum
- National Telecom Public Company Limited
- Office of the Government Pawnshop
- Playing Cards Factory, Excise Department
- Police Printing Bureau, Royal Thai Police
- Port Authority of Thailand
- Provincial Electricity Authority
- Provincial Waterworks Authority
- PTT Public Co., Ltd.
- Public Warehouse Organization
- Rubber Authority of Thailand
- Small and Medium Enterprise Development Bank of Thailand
- Sports Authority of Thailand
- State Railway of Thailand
- Thai Credit Guarantee Corporation
- Thai Maritime Navigation Co., Ltd.
- Thailand Institute of Scientific and Technological Research
- Thailand Post Co., Ltd.
- The Bangkok Dock Co., Ltd.
- The Syndicate of Thai Hotels & Tourists Enterprises Ltd.
- The Transport Co., Ltd.
- The Zoological Park Organization of Thailand under the Royal Patronage of H.M. the King
- Tobacco Authority of Thailand (formerly the Thailand Tobacco Monopoly)
- Tourism Authority of Thailand
- Wastewater Management Authority

== Former state enterprises ==
- Battery Organization of Thailand (disestablished in 2007)
- Office of the Rubber Replanting Aid Fund (merged into the Rubber Authority in 2015)
- Rubber Estate Organization (merged into the Rubber Authority in 2015)
- The Tanning Organization (disestablished in 2007)
- Thai Airways International Public Co., Ltd. (ceased to be a state enterprise on 22 May 2020).
- Krung Thai Bank Public Company Limited (ceased to be a state enterprise on 3 November 2020)
- Thailand Tobacco Monopoly (replaced by the Tobacco Authority in 2018)
- Secondary Mortgage Corporation (disestablished in 2020)
- TOT Public Company Limited (merged into National Telecom on 7 January 2021)
- CAT Telecom Public Co., Ltd. (merged into National Telecom on 7 January 2021)

== See also ==
- State agencies of Thailand
