= List of banks in Thailand =

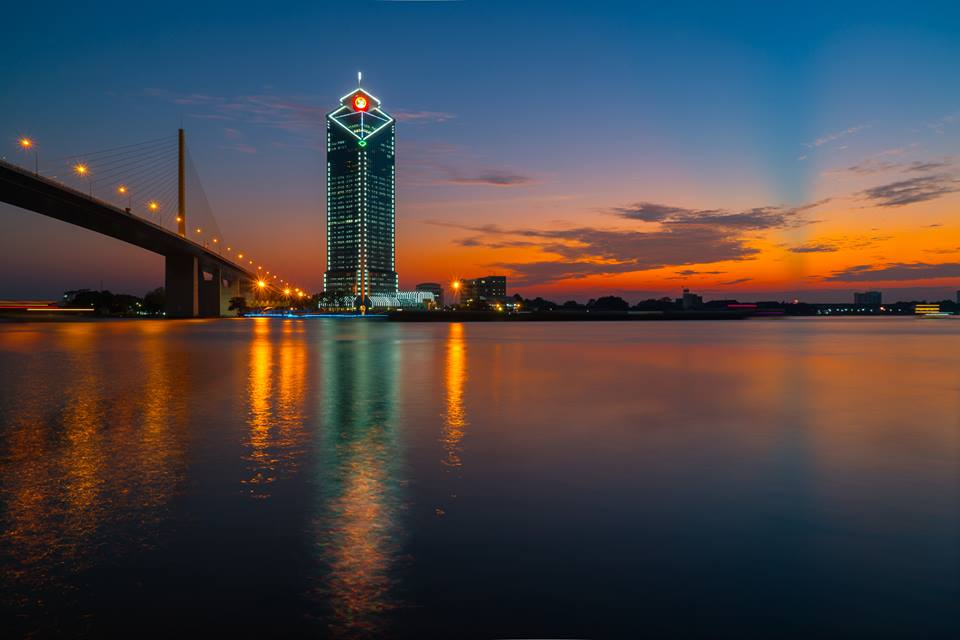
Kasikorn bank Rat Burana Office

In Thailand, the banks are governed by the Bank of Thailand, which was established in 1942. Across Thailand, there are thirty licensed banks which are registered with a further six being state-owned. In total they have a combined assets of 26.268 trillion baht (~ US$835.25 Billion) as of June 2019.

== Central bank ==
- Bank of Thailand

== State-owned banks ==
- Government Savings Bank
- GH Bank
- Bank for Agriculture and Agricultural Co-operatives (BAAC)
- Export–Import Bank of Thailand
- Islamic Bank of Thailand
- SME Development Bank of Thailand

== Thai commercial banks ==
=== Commercial banks ===
- Bangkok Bank
- Bank of Ayudhya (Krungsri)
- CIMB Thai Bank
- ICBC Thai
- Kasikornbank (KBank)
- Kiatnakin Phatra Bank
- Krungthai Bank
- Land & Houses Bank
- Siam Commercial Bank
- Standard Chartered Bank
- Tisco Bank
- TMBThanachart Bank
- United Overseas Bank (Thai)
- Thai Credit Bank

== Foreign banks with Bangkok branch ==
=== Ranked by total assets as of 31 Dec 2006 ===
| Rank | Name | Total Assets |
|---|---|---|
| 1 | MUFG Bank (Japan) | US$7.3 billion |
| 2 | Citibank (US) | US$5.7 billion |
| 3 | SMBC (Japan) | US$5.6 billion |
| 4 | Mizuho (Japan) | US$4.4 billion |
| 5 | HSBC | US$3.7 billion |
| 6 | Others | US$3.8 billion |
| | Total | US$36.1 billion |

=== Foreign banks (European) ===
- ABN Amro
- BNP Paribas
- Deutsche Bank
- HSBC

=== Foreign banks (Asian) ===
- Bank of China
- MUFG Bank
- Indian Overseas Bank
- Mizuho Bank
- Oversea-Chinese Banking Corporation
- RHB Bank Berhad
- Sumitomo Mitsui Banking Corporation

=== Foreign banks (North American) ===
- American Express Bank
- BofA Securities
- Citibank Thailand
- JPMorgan Chase

== Representative offices in Thailand ==
- ANZ
- Bank of Baroda
- Bayerische Landesbank
- BNY
- Cathay United Bank
- Chinatrust Commercial Bank (Taiwan)
- Commerzbank
- Credit Industriel et Commercial (CIC)
- Credit Suisse
- Daiwa Bank
- DBS Bank
- EFG International
- First Commercial Bank (Taiwan)
- German Investment Corporation (DEG)
- Hachijuni Bank
- ICICI Bank
- ICBC
- ING Bank
- Intesa Sanpaolo
- Japan Bank for International Cooperation
- Merrill
- Mega ICBC (Taiwan)
- Natexis Banques Populaires
- Rabobank
- Resona Bank
- Sanpaolo IMI
- UBS
- Wells Fargo
- Westdeutsche Landesbank Girozentrale
- Westpac
- World Bank Thailand
- Yamaguchi Bank

== Bank holidays ==
The Bank of Thailand (BOT) maintains the official list of banking holidays in Thailand.
