= Thailand Quality Award =

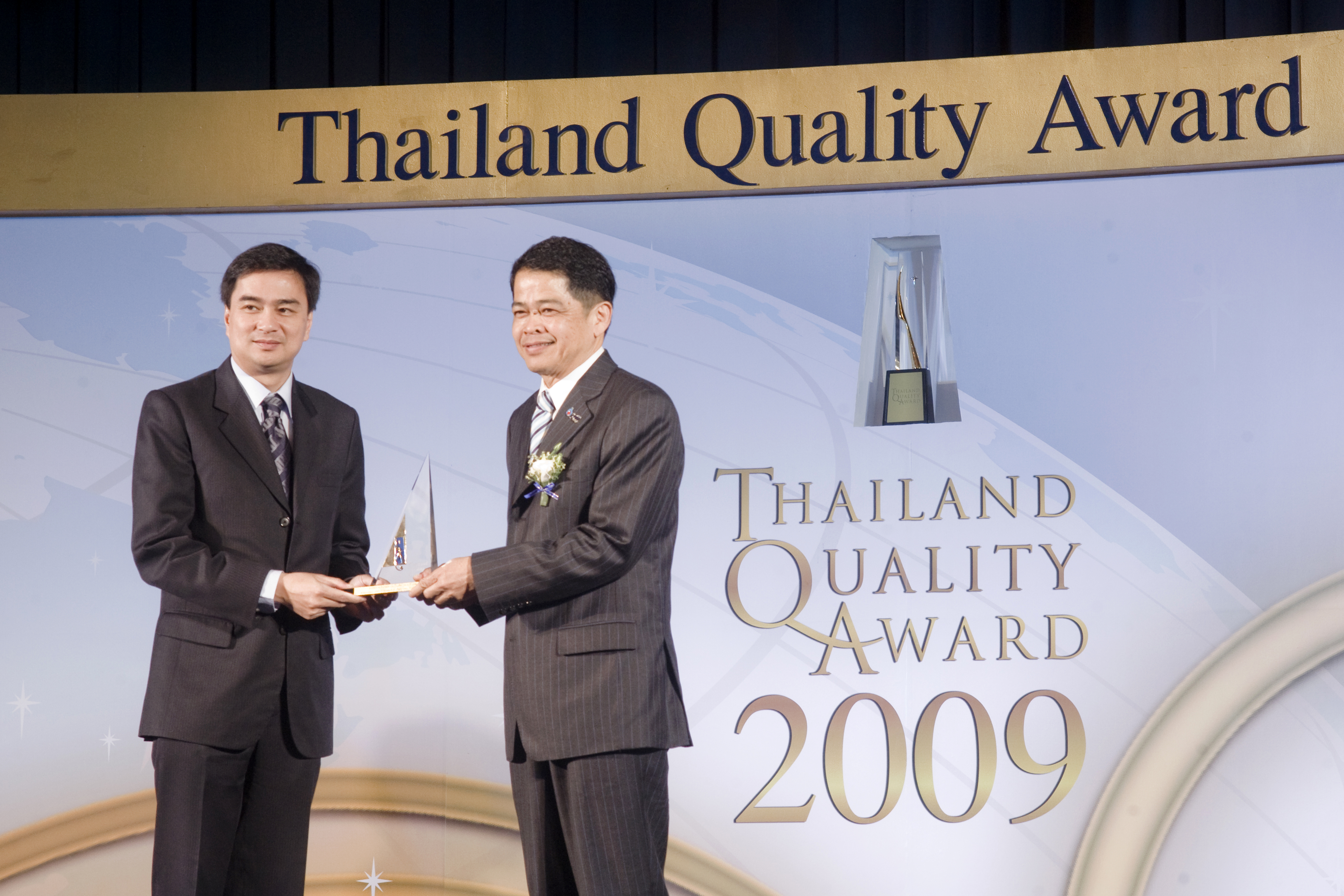
- Thailand Quality Award 2009
- Awarded for: Recognizing businesses worldwide for excellence in applying the principles of Total Quality Management
- Sponsored by: Thailand Productivity Institute (FTPI) and Thailand's National Science and Technology Development Agency (NSTDA)
- Date: 5 Sep 1996
- Country: Thailand
- First award: 2002
- Website: www.tqa.or.th

The Thailand Quality Award or TQA is the national quality award for Performance Excellence in Thailand. The TQA has a world class technical foundation and awarding process. It is closely modeled after the Malcolm Baldrige National Quality Award (MBNQA) and is an award with a rigorous screening process together with a standardized assessment system employing volunteering elite assessors from the private, public, government, state enterprise, medical, and education sectors.

== History and description ==
The Thailand Quality Award (TQA) was first launched in 2002. However, the history of the award started on September 5, 1996, with the signing of a Memorandum of Understanding (MOU) between the Thailand Productivity Institute (FTPI) and the National Science and Technology Development Agency (NSTDA) to study the guidelines for establishing an award.

The FTPI has been appointed by the government to be the Thailand Quality Award (TQA) Secretariat Office, also referred to as the National Quality Award Office. It is the main organization in Thailand encouraging the manufacturing and service sectors to adopt the TQA framework as an essential tool to improve their management capability.

On March 4, 2004, the TQA was won for the first time by a Thai company, Thai Paper Company Limited. a subsidiary of Siam Cement Group (SCG).

In 2013, the lead assessor of the TQA, Bill Voravuth Chengsupanimit, stated "In Thailand, upon signing an agreement between the Foundation of Thailand Productivity Institute and the National Science and Technology Development Agency, on September 5, 1996, the Thailand Quality Award (TQA) was initiated. The resulting TQA technical and decision-making processes are identical to the Malcolm Baldrige National Quality Award. Since TQA's inception, only four organizations have scored above 650 points to qualify for the TQA, out of hundreds of applicants. However, more than 50 organizations have achieved the Thailand Quality Class status by scoring more than 350 points."

On January 16, 2020, the FTPI hosted an event where they covered changes in the TQA for 2020–2021. The FTPI stated that the content of the criteria was revised to suit changing global social and economic conditions as well as to comply with the US MBNQA criteria.

It was announced on February 12, 2020, that True Group's Mobile Business Group had won the Thailand Quality Award 2019. This was the first time since 2012 that a Thai organization qualified by passing the rigorous evaluation criteria to receive the award. True Group's Mobile Business Group was also the first Thai telecommunication organization to win the award. However, the Government Housing Bank also achieved the TQA in 2019.

== Objectives ==
The stated objectives of the TQA are:

1. To support the implementation of the National Quality Award guidelines to improve competitiveness
2. To honor the organizations that have achieved global standards
3. To encourage learning and exchange of practices that Excellence
4. To show the international commitment to raise the standard of excellence in management

== Thailand Quality Award Recipients ==
Year	Award Recipient	Award
2019	True Group's Mobile Business Group	Thailand Quality Award (TQA)
	Government Housing Bank (GH Bank)	Thailand Quality Award (TQA)
	Phenolic Product Business Group; PTT Global Chemical Public Company Limited	Thailand Quality Class Plus: Operation
	Government Savings Bank (GSB)	Thailand Quality Class Plus: Operation
	GC Logistics Solutions Company Limited (GCL)	Thailand Quality Class Plus: Operation
	Metropolitan Waterworks Authority	Thailand Quality Class Award (TQC)
	Faculty of Nursing Chiang Mai University	Thailand Quality Class Award (TQC)
	Faculty of Medicine Chiang Mai University	Thailand Quality Class Award (TQC)
	Faculty of Medicine Ramathibodi Hospital Mahidol University	Thailand Quality Class Award (TQC)
	Bank for Agriculture and Agricultural Co-operatives	Thailand Quality Class Award (TQC)
	Mahidol University	Thailand Quality Class Award (TQC)
	North Bangkok Power Plant	Thailand Quality Class Award (TQC)
	MBK Public Company Limited	Thailand Quality Class Award (TQC)
2018	Ethylene Oxide Product Business Group; PTT Global Chemical Public Company Limited	Thailand Quality Class Plus: Operation
	Government Savings Bank	Thailand Quality Class Plus: Customer
	Ratchaprapa Dam Electricity Generating Authority of Thailand	Thailand Quality Class Award (TQC)
	Vajiralongkorn Dam Electricity; Electricity Generating Authority of Thailand (EGAT)	Thailand Quality Class Award (TQC)
	Srinakarin Dam Electricity Generating Authority of Thailand	Thailand Quality Class Award (TQC)
	Faculty of Medicine Chulalongkorn University	Thailand Quality Class Award (TQC)
	Government Housing Bank	Thailand Quality Class Award (TQC)
	Bangchak Corporation Public Company Limited	Thailand Quality Class Award (TQC)
	Khanom Electricity Generating Company Limited	Thailand Quality Class Award (TQC)
	PTT LNG Company Limited	Thailand Quality Class Award (TQC)
	IRPC Public Company Limited	Thailand Quality Class Award (TQC)
	Khon Kaen University	Thailand Quality Class Award (TQC)
	Northeast Hydroelectric Power Plant Electricity; Electricity Generating Authority of Thailand (EGAT)	Thailand Quality Class Award (TQC)
2017	Polymer Products Business Group; PTT Global Chemical Public Company Limited	Thailand At Quality: Class A Plus: Operation
	Bank Card Line Bank of Thailand	Thailand At Quality: Class A Plus: Operation
	Bhumibol Dam; Electricity Generating Authority of Thailand (EGAT)	Thailand Quality Class Award (TQC)
	Government Savings Bank	Thailand Quality Class Award (TQC)
2016	Ethylene Oxide Product Business Group; PTT Global Chemical Public Company Limited	Thailand Quality Class Award (TQC)
	Faculty of Medicine Siriraj Hospital Mahidol University	Thailand Quality Class Award (TQC)
	Thai Petroleum Pipeline Company Limited	Thailand Quality Class Award (TQC)
	PTT Polymer Marketing Company Limited	Thailand Quality Class Award (TQC)
	PTT Polymer Logistics Company Limited	Thailand Quality Class Award (TQC)
	Nam Phong Power Plant; Electricity Generating Authority of Thailand (EGAT)	Thailand Quality Class Award (TQC)
	Bang Pakong Power Plant; Electricity Generating Authority of Thailand (EGAT)	Thailand Quality Class Award (TQC)
2015	Polymer Products Business Group; PTT Global Chemical Public Company Limited	Thailand Quality Class Award (TQC)
	Central Pattana Khon Kaen Company Limited	Thailand Quality Class Award (TQC)
	Bangchak Petroleum Public Company Limited	Thailand Quality Class Award (TQC)
	Polypropylene plastic resin factory IRPC Public Company Limited	Thailand Quality Class Award (TQC)
	Mae Moh Power Plant Electricity Generating Authority of Thailand	Thailand Quality Class Award (TQC)
	Swine Business Line: CPF (Thailand) Public Company Limited	Thailand Quality Class Award (TQC)
2014	Counter Service Company Limited	Thailand Quality Class Award (TQC)
	PTTEP Siam Company Limited S1 Project	Thailand Quality Class Award (TQC)
	Business of Eleven CP All Public Company Limited	Thailand Quality Class Award (TQC)
	Bank card line Bank of Thailand	Thailand Quality Class Award (TQC)
2013	Counter Service Company Limited	Thailand Quality Class Award (TQC)
	Bangchak Petroleum Public Company Limited	Thailand Quality Class Award (TQC)
	PTTEP Siam Company Limited	Thailand Quality Class Award (TQC)
	PTT Polymer Logistics Company Limited	Thailand Quality Class Award (TQC)
	Polypropylene plastic resin factory IRPC Public Company Limited	Thailand Quality Class Award (TQC)
	Nongkae Aquatic Feed Factory - Charoen Pokphand Foods Public Company Limited	Thailand Quality Class Award (TQC)
	Ranot Aquatic Processing Plant - Charoen Pokphand Foods Public Company Limited	Thailand Quality Class Award (TQC)
	King Chulalongkorn Memorial Hospital	Thailand Quality Class Award (TQC)
	Mae Moh Power Plant Electricity Generating Authority of Thailand	Thailand Quality Class Award (TQC)
	Queen Sirikit National Institute of Child Health	Thailand Quality Class Award (TQC)
2012	Counter Service Company Limited	Thailand Quality Class Award (TQC)
	Central Pattana Chiang Mai Company Limited	Thailand Quality Class Award (TQC)
	Aquatic Feed Mill (Mahachai) Charoen Pokphand Foods Public Company Limited	Thailand Quality Class Award (TQC)
	Natural Gas Business Unit, PTT Public Company Limited	Thailand Quality Class Award (TQC)
	International Trade Business Unit, PTT Public Company Limited	Thailand Quality Class Award (TQC)
	Oil Business Unit, PTT Public Company Limited	Thailand Quality Class Award (TQC)
2011	Saraburi Chicken Processing Food Business; Bangkok Produce Merchandising Public Company Limited	Thailand Quality Class Award (TQC)
	Chicken Processing Food Business (Nakhon Ratchasima); Charoen Pokphand Foods Public Company Limited	Thailand Quality Class Award (TQC)
	Aquaculture Plant (Mahachai); Charoen Pokphand Foods Public Company Limited	Thailand Quality Class Award (TQC)
	Ban Phru Aquaculture Plant; Charoen Pokphand Foods Public Company Limited	Thailand Quality Class Award (TQC)
	Pak Thong Chai Feedmill Factory; Charoen Pokphand Foods Public Company Limited	Thailand Quality Class Award (TQC)
	Chicken processing plant and Minburi 1 food processing factory Charoen Pokphand Foods Public Company Limited	Thailand Quality Class Award (TQC)
	Central Pattana Chiang Mai Company Limited	Thailand Quality Class Award (TQC)
	TOT Public Company Limited	Thailand Quality Class Award (TQC)
	Thai Oil Public Company Limited	Thailand Quality Class Award (TQC)
	Natural Gas Business Unit; PTT Public Company Limited	Thailand Quality Class Award (TQC)
	International Trade Business Unit; PTT Public Company Limited	Thailand Quality Class Award (TQC)
	Oil Business Unit; PTT Public Company Limited	Thailand Quality Class Award (TQC)
2010	Gas Pipeline System Division; PTT Public Company Limited	Thailand Quality Award (TQA)
	Saraburi Chicken Processing Business; Bangkok Produce Merchandising Public Company Limited	Thailand Quality Class Award (TQC)
	Chicken Processing Food Business (Nakhon Ratchasima); Charoen Pokphand Foods Public Company Limited	Thailand Quality Class Award (TQC)
	Pak Thong Chai Feedmill Factory; Charoen Pokphand Foods Public Company Limited	Thailand Quality Class Award (TQC)
	Chicken processing plant and Minburi 1 food processing factory Charoen Pokphand Foods Public Company Limited	Thailand Quality Class Award (TQC)
	Nong Chok Branch; Charoen Pokphand Foods Public Company Limited	Thailand Quality Class Award (TQC)
	Central Pattana Chiang Mai Company Limited	Thailand Quality Class Award (TQC)
	Thai Oil Public Company Limited	Thailand Quality Class Award (TQC)
	Bangchak Petroleum Public Company Limited	Thailand Quality Class Award (TQC)
	Retail Link (Thailand) Company Limited	Thailand Quality Class Award (TQC)
	International Pet Food Company Limited	Thailand Quality Class Award (TQC)
2009	Gas Pipeline System Division; PTT Public Company Limited	Thailand Quality Class Award (TQC)
	Chicken and Food Processing Business (Saraburi); Bangkok Produce Merchandising Public Company Limited	Thailand Quality Class Award (TQC)
	Thai Oil Public Company Limited	Thailand Quality Class Award (TQC)
	Pak Thong Chai Feedmill Factory; Charoen Pokphand Foods Public Company Limited	Thailand Quality Class Award (TQC)
2008	Thai Lube Base Public Company Limited	Thailand Quality Class Award (TQC)
	Bumrungrad International Hospital	Thailand Quality Class Award (TQC)
	Taphan Hin Crown Prince Hospital	Thailand Quality Class Award (TQC)
2007	Gas Pipeline System Division; PTT Public Company Limited	Thailand Quality Class Award (TQC)
	Songkhla Nakarin Hospital	Thailand Quality Class Award (TQC)
2006	Rayong Gas Separation Plant; PTT Public Company Limited	Thailand Quality Award (TQA)
	CP Seven Eleven Public Company Limited	Thailand Quality Class Award (TQC)
	Counter Service Company Limited	Thailand Quality Class Award (TQC)
2005	CP Retailing and Marketing Company Limited (Frozen food business)	Thailand Quality Class Award (TQC)
	CP Retailing and Marketing Company Limited (Bakery Business)	Thailand Quality Class Award (TQC)
	Chaiboon Brothers Company Limited	Thailand Quality Class Award (TQC)
	Rayong Gas Separation Plant; PTT Public Company Limited	Thailand Quality Class Award (TQC)
2004	Thai Olefins Public Company Limited	Thailand Quality Class Award (TQC)
	CP Seven Eleven Public Company Limited	Thailand Quality Class Award (TQC)
	Dana Spicer (Thailand) Company Limited	Thailand Quality Class Award (TQC)
	Products and Construction Materials Company Limited	Thailand Quality Class Award (TQC)
	Spansion (Thailand) Company Limited	Thailand Quality Class Award (TQC)
	Rayong Gas Separation Plant; PTT Public Company Limited	Thailand Quality Class Award (TQC)
2003	Thai Paper Products Company Limited	Thailand Quality Award (TQA)
	Thai Carbon Black Public Co., Ltd. (TCB)	Thailand Quality Class Award (TQC)
	Siam Mitsui PTA Company Limited Siam Mitsui PTA Co., Ltd. (SMPC)	Thailand Quality Class Award (TQC)
	The Continuing Education Center of Chulalongkorn University	Thailand Quality Class Award (TQC)
	Siam Packaging Company Limited	Thailand Quality Class Award (TQC)
	Thai Cement (Kaeng Khoi) Company Limited	Thailand Quality Class Award (TQC)
2002	Thai Acrylic Fiber Company Limited	Thailand Quality Award (TQA)
	Thai Carbon Black Public Company Limited	Thailand Quality Class Award (TQC)
	Thai Paper Products Company Limited	Thailand Quality Class Award (TQC)
	Dana Spicer (Thailand) Company Limited	Thailand Quality Class Award (TQC)
	The Siam Cement (Kaeng Khoi) Company Limited	Thailand Quality Class Award (TQC)
	Chulalongkorn University Continuing Education Center	Thailand Quality Class Award (TQC)
	Siam Packaging Company Limited	Thailand Quality Class Award (TQC)

== See also ==
- List of national quality awards
- Total Quality Management
