= List of largest companies in Thailand =

This article lists the largest companies in Thailand in terms of their revenue, net profit and total assets, according to the American business magazines Fortune and Forbes.

== 2020 Fortune list ==
This list displays all Thai companies in the Fortune Global 500, which ranks the world's largest companies by annual revenue. The figures below are given in millions of US dollars and are for the fiscal year 2019. Also listed are the headquarters location, net profit, number of employees worldwide and industry sector of each company.

Rank	Fortune 500 rank	Name	Industry	Revenue (USD millions)	Profits (USD millions)	Employees	Headquarters
1	140	PTT Public Company Limited	Oil and Gas	71,502	2,994	27,987	Bangkok

== 2021 Forbes list ==
This list is based on the Forbes Global 2000, which ranks the world's 2,000 largest publicly traded companies. The Forbes list takes into account a multitude of factors, including the revenue, net profit, total assets and market value of each company; each factor is given a weighted rank in terms of importance when considering the overall ranking. The table below also lists the headquarters location and industry sector of each company. The figures are in billions of US dollars and are for the year 2020. All 15 companies from Thailand are listed.

Rank	Forbes 2000 rank	Name	Headquarters	Revenue (billions US$)	Profit (billions US$)	Assets (billions US$)	Value (billions US$)	Industry
1	234	PTT Public Company Limited	Bangkok	51.6	1.2	84.9	36.4	Oil and Gas
2	648	Siam Cement Group	Bangkok	12.8	1.1	25.0	15.8	Building materials
3	705	Kasikornbank	Bangkok	8.2	0.9	122.1	10.3	Banking
4	791	Siam Commercial Bank	Bangkok	5.6	0.9	109.4	11.4	Banking
5	840	CP All	Bangkok	16.8	0.5	17.5	18.4	Retail
6	859	Charoen Pokphand Foods	Bangkok	18.8	0.8	25.4	7.9	Food production
7	1113	Bangkok Bank	Bangkok	5.2	0.5	127.6	7.5	Banking
8	1129	ThaiBev	Bangkok	8.1	0.7	13.7	14.0	Beverage
9	1161	Krung Thai Bank	Bangkok	4.9	0.5	111.3	5.1	Banking
10	1242	Advanced Info Service	Bangkok	5.5	0.9	11.7	16.0	Telecommunication
11	1703	TMBThanachart Bank	Bangkok	2.9	0.3	60.4	3.6	Banking
12	1780	PTT Global Chemical	Bangkok	10.5	0.0	16.3	9.0	Chemicals
13	1884	Airports of Thailand	Bangkok	0.5	-0.2	6.9	30.0	Transportation
14	1956	Indorama Ventures	Bangkok	10.6	0.0	15.1	8.3	Chemicals

== See also ==
- List of companies of Thailand
- List of largest companies by revenue
