= Ylona Garcia =

Filipina singer, songwriter and actress (born 2002)

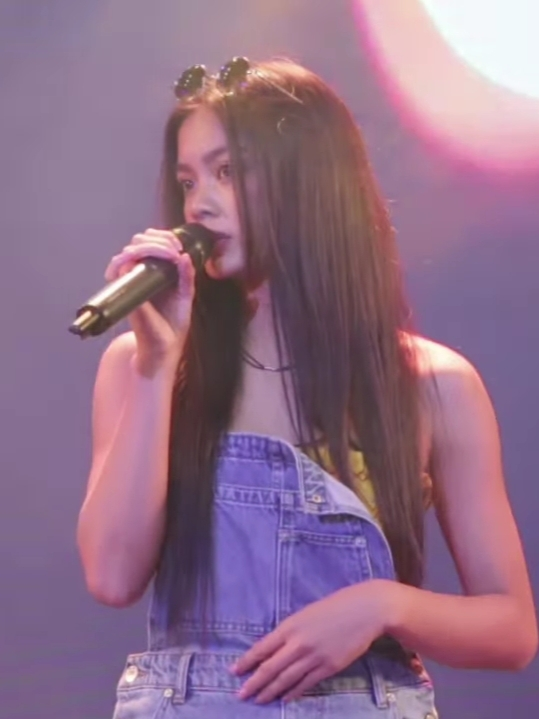
- Garcia in 2019
- Born: Ylona Jade Garcia; February 28, 2002 (age 24); Sydney, Australia
- Occupations: Singer; songwriter; actress
- Years active: 2015–present
- Musical career
- Genres: R&B; pop
- Instruments: Vocals; guitar; piano
- Labels: Star Music; Homeworkz; 88rising

Ylona Jade Garcia (Note: Garcia was born in Australia, so she does not have a Philippine name.) (Tagalog: [ʔɪˈlɔnɐ gaɾˈsɪa]; born February 28, 2002) is a Filipino-Australian singer, songwriter and actress. Garcia made her breakthrough in the Philippines in 2015 when she became part of the television series Pinoy Big Brother, where she finished as first runner-up. She is based in the United States and releases music internationally through 88rising. She is also a content creator for gaming and lifestyle brand 100 Thieves.

== Early life ==
Ylona Jade Garcia was born on February 28, 2002, in Sydney, Australia. She is the third of five siblings. Her father is a pathology technician, while her mother is a nurse and medical technologist.

== Career ==
=== 2015–2020: Pinoy Big Brother, music and acting debuts ===
In 2015, Garcia auditioned to become a housemate for the first part of the second special season of ABS-CBN's reality television series Pinoy Big Brother. She was selected after showcasing her abilities in singing, acting, and dancing, as well for her "confidence and candid remarks." She entered the house on the second day alongside Franco Rodriguez, Kyle Secades, and Zonia Mejia. During her time in the house, Garcia composed and recorded two songs: "Win the Fight" (2015), co-written and recorded with fellow housemate Jimboy Martin, and "Magmahal Muli" (2005, lit. To Love Again), recorded with fellow housemate Bailey May. The latter was originally composed and recorded by Sam Milby and Say Alonzo from the first season of Pinoy Big Brother (2005). Both songs were later featured on the extended play PBB 737 (2015), which was released on Spotify on 9 August, 2015.

After surviving four eviction nights as a nominated housemate, Garcia was selected as one of the four finalists after garnering 19.84% of the public vote. She exited the Big Brother house on the fiftieth day to allow the second part of the special season to commence. During an episode of ABS-CBN's noontime variety series It's Showtime! (2009), Garcia and her fellow finalists Jimboy Martin, Bailey May and Franco Rodriguez were instructed to return to the Big Brother house. During her second stay, she participated in the final weekly task, "Short Film Festival," with the remaining housemates and was cast in Pinoy Big Brother's romantic comedy film Trending: Love (2015, stylized as TRENDING: LOVE), in which she portrayed the character Sophie Mendoza.

On 14 August 2015, Garcia participated in the Teen Power: The Kabataang Pinoy Concert Party alongside her former Pinoy Big Brother: 737 housemates and finalists from the first part of the second special season, as well as other teenage actors and musicians, including Alexa Ilacad and Gimme 5. On 8 November 2015, Garcia was named first runner-up to Jimboy Martin during the Big Night ceremony at the Albay Astrodome in Legazpi, Albay, after receiving 42.24% of the public vote. Later that month, she was cast alongside Bailey May as part of the extended cast of ABS-CBN's romantic comedy television series On the Wings of Love (2015–16), in which they portrayed the characters Audrey Olivar and Harry Fausto, respectively. At the end of 2015, Star Music named Garcia as its representative for the "#SpotifySpotlight" segment in 2016.

In 2016, Garcia revealed on the musical variety television show ASAP that her debut studio album would be released "very, very, very, very soon." On 21 January 2016, Coca-Cola announced Ylona as one of the ambassadors for their "Taste the Feeling" campaign together with Bailey May, James Reid, Nadine Lustre, Maine Mendoza, Alden Richards, Liza Soberano, Enrique Gil, Janella Salvador, and Enchong Dee. On 31 January 2016, Garcia was announced as the "Celebrity VJ" for the month of February for the music television network Myx. On 4 February 2016, Ylona was signed by Star Music. She eventually announced that her upcoming debut studio album would be released soon, hinting at its release sometime during early-mid 2016.

In the same year, she joined the reality music competition We Love OPM: The Celebrity Sing-Offs as part of Team Yeng: Oh My Girls. She, together with Alexa Ilacad and GirlTrends member Krissha Viaje, were coached and trained by their mentor Pop Rock Royalty Yeng Constantino. The girls finished the competition as runners-up just behind the grand winner, Team Erik's Tres Kantos.

In 2018, Garcia became a member of the teen pop group ASAP G!. Other members of the group are Isabela Vinzon, Jayda Avanzado, Kyle Echarri, Jeremy Glinoga, and Darren Espanto. The group formed on 3 June 2018 and disbanded in November 2018, when the show was reformatted into ASAP Natin 'To.

In 2019, Garcia transferred from Star Music to Homeworkz for her recording label.

On 3 May 2020, Garcia released the music video for her single "Walk In My Timbs" which features R&B artist Jay-R. The song made its official debut performance on 8 May through Philippine morning show Umagang Kay Ganda. Jay-R revealed that Ylona is the actual writer of the song while praising her amazing writing skills at a very young age.

On 3 December 2020, Garcia performed on 88rising's Double Happiness Winter Festival performing her single "Spilt Milk" and a cover of "Winter Things" by Ariana Grande.

=== 2021–present: 88rising, international endeavors ===
On 24 February, Asian American-oriented US record label 88rising released a mysterious photo of Garcia on Twitter with its caption "sooner than you think". The label later officially announced the addition of Garcia as their new artist and will be handled by "Paradise Rising", a label under 88rising and Globe Telecom that focuses on Filipino artists.

Garcia, on 1 March, announced her next single's title ("All That") alongside the release of the song's video teaser on her official social media platforms. On 3 March, Paradise Rising released the official music video for "All That". The song reached more than one million views on YouTube in four days.

In an announcement made by 88rising on August 26, Garcia was confirmed to be making a brand new single "Don't Go Changing" for the Head in the Clouds album. On November 7, 2021, Garcia performed at the Rose Bowl stadium in Pasadena, California with her 20-minute spotlight in the Head in the Clouds Music Festival.

In January 2022, Garcia released her new single "Entertain Me", released in partnership with the tactical shooter game VALORANT. The song was used in the game's trailer for its new Agent, Neon, a Manila native who also appears in the music video (and in the cinematic trailer for the agent released by Riot Games). On the 25th, Ylona disclosed that she has since relocated to Los Angeles, California, in the US, and will stay in the country for good to further pursue her career in music.

In August 2022, Garcia became the first Filipino to be featured on the pages of American fashion magazine V for its Fall 2022 edition. On Instagram, V referred to Ylona as "the new global voice leading R&B Pop."

In August 2024, Garcia joined gaming and lifestyle brand 100 Thieves as a content creator.

On February 28, 2025, Garcia released a soft rock single titled "Sick of It", which she wrote in November 2023 about growing up in a "toxic" entertainment industry.

On January 16, 2026, she released the singles "Question Mark" and "Could've Been".

== Public image ==
In June 2025, Gavin Martinez of the Philippine Daily Inquirer's US Bureau wrote that Garcia "has long been more than just a pop star", describing her as a "style icon" and "voice of her generation".

=== Endorsements ===
In June 2017, Garcia was part of the new set of endorsers by T&J Salon Professionals. In December 2017, Ylona was introduce as the brand ambassador of Café Amazon in the Philippines.

In September 2019, Pond's Philippines launched a campaign which aims to provide women with a platform to share inspiring stories on how they overcame their hesitations to become the best version of themselves, headed by Ylona, Kathryn Bernardo, Heart Evangelista, Nadine Lustre, and Gabbi Garcia.

Brand	Year	Ref
Happy Skin X Disney	2016	
Coca-Cola PH	2016	
Huawei Philippines	2017	
Jollibee	2017	
T&J Salon Professionals	2017	
Clean & Clear	2017	
Café Amazon Philippines	2017	
Bench	2018	
Pond's Philippines	2019	
Sunsilk PH	2019	
Fujifilm Instax	2019	
Mountain Dew PH	2020	

== Discography ==
=== Extended plays ===
Album
Title	EP details	Certification	Ref.
My Name Is Ylona Garcia	Released: 5 August 2016; Label: Star Music; Formats: CD, digital download	Gold (Philippines)	

=== Singles ===
==== As lead artist ====
Title	Year	Peak chart positions		Album
Title	Year	KOR	NZ Hot	Album
"Dahan Dahan Dahan Lang"	2016	—	—	My Name Is Ylona Garcia
"Fly Tonight"	2017	—	—	My Name Is Ylona Garcia
"Maybe a Little Bit" (featuring Jay R)	2019	—	—	Non-album singles
"Pretty Please"	2019	—	—	Non-album singles
"Lie So Well"	2019	—	—	Non-album singles
"Space" (featuring Jamilah)	2020	—	—	Non-album singles
"Walk in My Timbs" (featuring Jay R)	2020	—	—	Non-album singles
"Spilt Milk" (featuring Billy Davis)	2020	—	—	Non-album singles
"All That"	2021	—	—	Non-album singles
"Don't Go Changing"	2021	(Note: Don't Go Changing" did not enter the Gaon Digital Chart, but peaked at position 93 on the Gaon BGM Chart.)	—	Head in the Clouds
"Entertain Me"	2022	—	35	Valorant Official Soundtrack
"Vibin"	2022	—	—	Non-album single
"Sick of It"	2025	—	—	Non-album single
"—" denotes releases that did not chart or were not released in that region.

==== Collaborative singles ====
Title	Year	Peak charts position		Album
Title	Year	PH		Album
Title	Year	Hits Chart	Pinoy Chart	Album
"Win the Fight" (with Jimboy Martin)	2015	—	—	My Name Is Ylona Garcia
"Magmahal Muli" (with Bailey May)	2015	—	—	PBB 737 (2015)
"O Pag-Ibig" (with Bailey May)	2016	1	1	Himig Handog P-Pop Love Songs (2016)
"Echoes" (with Valkyrae and Fuslie)	2024	—	—	Non-album single
"—" denotes releases that did not chart or were not released in that region.

==== Soundtrack appearance ====
Title	Year	Peak charts position		Album
Title	Year	PH		Album
Title	Year	Hits Chart	Pinoy Chart	Album
"Don't Say Goodbye"	2016	—	—	Pinoy Big Brother: Lucky 7 OST
"O Pag-Ibig" (with Bailey May)	2016	1	1	Vince and Kath and James OST
"Dahan Dahan Dahan Lang"	2019	7	10	Hello, Love, Goodbye OST
"—" denotes releases that did not chart or were not released in that region.

== Videography ==
=== Music videos ===
Title	Year	Director
"O Pag-Ibig"	2016	Jasper Salimbangon
"Dahan Dahan Dahan Lang"	2016	—N/a
"Fly Tonight"	2017	Alco Guerrero
"Space"	2020	Colby Jackson
"Walk in My Timbs"	2020	E
"All That"	2021	Suz Kim
"Don't Go Changing"	2021	Louis Browne
"Entertain Me"	2022	Kee Hwang
"Vibin'"	2022	Matthias Russo-Larsson
"Echoes"	2024	Quinn Cavin

== Filmography ==
=== Series ===
Year	Title	Note(s)	Ref.
2021	Filipino American History Month	Activities (busking, cooking) by Ylona to celebrate the event.	
2021–present	LA Diaries	Behind the scenes from Ylona's adventures & daily life.	

=== Hosting ===
Year	Title	Notes	Ref.
2017	One Music Popssss	Guest Host	
2019	Coke Studio Summer Concert	with Justin Quirino	

=== Television ===
Year	Title	Role(s)	Type of Role	Ref
2015	Pinoy Big Brother: 737	Herself	Housemate	
2015	It's Showtime	Herself	Guest / performer	
2015–2016	On the Wings of Love	Audrey Olivar	Extended cast	
2015–2020	ASAP	Herself	Performer/ Member of ASAP BFF's and ASAP G!	
2016	Myx	Herself	Celebrity VJ	
2016	We Love OPM	Herself	Member of Oh My Girls	
2018	Sana Dalawa ang Puso	Tadhana Tabayoyong	Supporting cast	
2018	Alamat ng Ano: Getaway Driver	Regina	Supporting cast	
2019	Coke Studio PH: My Feels	Herself	Season 3 Host	
2019	Myx	Herself	Myx VJ	

== Concert and tours ==
=== Concerts ===
Title	Date	Venue	Producer	Ref
One Music Digital Concert: My Name Is Ylona Garcia	July 29, 2016	ABS-CBN (Studio 10)	One Music	
Arrival Ylona Garcia	October 21, 2017	Music Museum	Star Events	

=== Concert participation ===
Title	Date	Venue	Producer	Ref
Teen Power: The Kabataang Pinoy Concert Party	August 14, 2015	Aliw Theater	Star Events	
Family is Love: The 2018 Christmas Concert	December 11, 2018	Araneta Coliseum	Star Events	

=== Performances on award shows, television shows and specials ===
Event	Date	City	Country	Performed song(s)	Ref.
Asia Rising: Summer Edition	May 27, 2020	N/A (Offline concerts)		—N/a (Note: Postponed, no further update since then for the event.)	
Double Happiness: Winter Wonder Festival	December 2, 2020	N/A (Offline concerts)		"Spilt Milk" & "Winter Things" (Ariana Grande)	
Head in the Clouds Festival	November 6, 2021	Los Angeles	United States	"All That" & "Don't Go Changing"	
VCT APAC Challengers	March 21, 2022	N/A (Offline concert)		"Entertain Me"	
Outloud Rising Voices Music Festival	June 3, 2022	West Hollywood	United States	"All That", "Vibin", & "Entertain Me"	
Head in the Clouds Festival	August 21, 2022	Los Angeles	United States	"Vibin", "Don't Go Changing", "Entertain Me", "Crazy" (Gnarls Barkley), & "I Did Something Bad" (Taylor Swift)	
Head in the Clouds Festival	December 3, 2022	Jakarta	Indonesia	"Space" and "Crazy" (Gnarls Barkley)	
Head in the Clouds Festival	December 10, 2022	Manila	Philippines	—N/a (Note: Due to bad weather event and strict curfew, Ylona Garcia did not perform.)	
Wanderland Music and Arts Festival	March 4, 2023	Muntinlupa	Philippines		
