= TQC (disambiguation) =

TQC most commonly refers to Total quality control.

TQC or TQc may also refer to:

- EFFAS Commission on Training & Qualification, a standing commission of the European Federation of Financial Analysts Societies (EFFAS)
- Tasmanian Qualifications Certificate, an academic qualification in Tasmania, Australia. See Education in Australia § Qualifications
- Télé-Québec, a Canadian French-language public educational television network abbreviated TQ or TQc
- Thailand Quality Class Award, a subsidiary award of the Thailand Quality Award
- Topological quantum computer, a type of quantum computer that utilises anyons.
- Toronto Quartette Club, the organisation which founded the first Toronto String Quartette
