= TQA =

TQA can refer to:

- Takia railway station, in Patan, Uttar Pradesh, India, (station code: TQA)
- Tamgha-e-Quaid-e-Azam, a civil award conferred by the government of Pakistan
- Tasiusaq Heliport (Avannaata), a heliport in Greenland (IATA code: TQA)
- Team Qhubeka NextHash, a former UCI road cycling team based in South Africa (UCI team code: TQA)
- Thailand Quality Award, a national quality award for performance excellence
