= 2013 Rayong oil spill =

Environmental disaster in Thailand

Rayong oil spill
- Interactive map of Rayong oil spill
- Location: Rayong Province, Thailand
- Coordinates: 12.5°N 101.3°E
- Date: 27 July 2013

Cause
- Cause: accident during transfer operation
- Operator: PTT

Spill characteristics
- Volume: 50,000–190,000 litres (310–1,200 bbl)

Location of Gulf of Thailand in Indian Ocean
Approximate location of oil spill in Gulf of Thailand

The Rayong oil spill occurred on July 27, 2013, in the Gulf of Thailand, off the coast of Ko Samet and Map Ta Phut in Rayong Province.

== Event ==
On July 27, 2013, a pipeline owned by PTTGC Plc, a Thai state-owned oil company, burst while oil was being transferred from an undersea well to a tanker. PTTGC then followed the operation procedures for oil spill management. The Company used boats and airplanes to spray oil-spill dispersants, 0,612 litres of Slickgone NS and 6,930 litres of Super-Dispersant 25, which are permitted by the Department of Pollution Control to be used in Thailand, because they have low toxicity, are biodegradable and do not bio-accumulate or cause mutation and degeneration. It released also a boom to contain the spilled oil within the area. However, the boom did not work well due to bad weather.

On the night of 28 July 2013, the oil leak (from a pipeline) 35 km (22 mi) from the beach at Ko Samet's Coconut Bay (Ao Phrao) resulted in the beach being closed and its tourists evacuated, after spillage reached the beach. On 4 August 2013 media said that the crude oil spill had occurred 20 km (12 mi) off of Thailand's mainland, "when a floating hose transferring oil from a tanker to a PTT refinery pipeline broke sending, PTT says, 50,000 L (310 bbl) of oil spewing into the coastal waters". Two beaches have been closed due to uncertainty about water toxicity. Ko Samet is a popular tourist island, not far from Bangkok, 10 km (6.2 mi) off the coast of Ban Phe', Rayong. Concerns have been growing about the oil spill and the inconsistent information released.

Ko Samet is close to Rayong and Map Ta Phut, and they have had a long history of environmental problems since they opened in 1990. About 25,000 people live in the Map Ta Phut municipality. In 1997, the pollution came to public attention when 1,000 pupils and teachers at a local school suffered from illnesses after inhaling toxic emissions and had to be hospitalized. An independent test carried out in 2005 demonstrated that airborne cancerous toxic chemicals released by Map Ta Phut Industrial Estate exceeded safety standards of developed nations by 60 to 3,000 times.

The oil spill is in part connected to the oil operations at Map Ta Phut. Anthony Zola, an American environmental consultant, is reported to have said "In rural areas, there is almost no enforcement at all. Water pollution, air pollution, noise pollution—you can make all the complaints you want, and no one pays any attention to you." Map Ta Phut was closed down in 2009 by the previous prime minister, Abhisit Vejjajiva, due to safety concerns. The New York Times reported "Even among critics of the court decisions, there is widespread agreement that Map Ta Phut is heavily polluted and unhealthy for those who live nearby. But environmental experts remain skeptical that the court decisions will fix the problem."

Two days after the oil spill was discovered, PTT closed their War Room down, according to Bangkok Post, and they have consistently since then tried to play down the effects of the spill. A week later they were saying it was safe to go to the beach and that it was clean. Greenpeace is concerned with the use of dispersants and the oil has sunk to the bottom and the full effects of the spill have yet to be understood. Mercury levels have also been reported to be 21 times safe limits. The dispersants also have negative effects and can cause cancers, kidney and liver problems. Some people swimming in the sea have reported dizziness. Bangkok Post reported "In 2012, a study found that Corexit increases the toxicity of oil by 52 times. It can remain in the ecological food chain for many years and cause widespread and long-lasting health impacts."

== Estimates ==
Official reports said 50,000 L (310 bbl) of oil were spilled, but critics of the oil company and the government say that the spill was much larger and warned of health risks posed both by the spill and by the chemicals being used to disperse the oil.

A higher estimate of the oil spill has been performed by Somporn Chuai-aree of Prince Songkhla University: "as low as 108,000 L (680 bbl) or as high as 190,000 L (1,200 bbl)". This estimate is believed by associate professor Siwat Pongniumchan from the National Institute of Development Administration (Nida), who disbelieves previous estimates.

== Effects ==
Tourism operators and officials were concerned about the effects on tourism in the area, as beaches in Rayong and on the nearby resort island of Ko Samet were impacted.

A 14 August 2013 Bangkok Post article said that "Fishery Department director-general Wimol Jantrarotai said Chulalongkorn University lab tests on seafood found metal contamination in samples from fish markets near Koh Samet."

The oil company's information sheet given to media (on the beach) on 31 July, said that the oil dispersant used is "Slickgone NS".

On 30 July 2013 Bangkok Post said that "authorities and more than 500 PTT employees have been struggling to prevent the slick spreading at the beach. They have tried to contain the spill, which has stretched almost 1 km (0.62 mi) along the bay, using containment booms to prevent further environmental damage in the area."

A 14 August 2013 Bangkok Post article said that "mercury levels found in sea water off Ao Phrao beach on Koh Samet were 29 times higher than safety standards allow, according to the Pollution Control Department. Furthermore "Niphon Phungsuwan, a marine expert from the Department of Marine and Coastal Resources, said more than 70% of coral at Ao Phrao had been bleached."

Bangkok Post reports "PTTGC has remained silent about what chemicals it is using but also said they could pose a hazard to the environment and people's health." In 2012, a study found that Corexit increases the toxicity of oil by 52 times. It can remain in the ecological food chain for many years and cause widespread and long-lasting health impacts. "The use of dispersants is a solution that creates new and worse problems," Ms Arpa said. The main ingredients of Corexit include 2-Butoxyethanol which can comprise up to 60% of the dispersant and is known to harm the blood, kidneys, liver and central nervous system. Some people swimming near Ko Samet have reported dizziness, and two beaches have been closed. Swimming is not recommended until more is known and the full environmental impacts have been independently verified. As of 20 August 2013, tourists are recommended to use caution if and when going swimming in the water, and to be careful of seafood for now. They should report dizziness of feeling unwell to the relevant authorities or to their embassy.

On 31 August 2013 Bangkok Post said that the level of total petroleum hydrocarbon (TPH) "still exceeds safety standards".

== Insurance ==
On 30 July 2013 Bangkok Post said that "The company PTTGC has insurance coverage of US$50 million with Dhipaya Insurance."

== See also ==
- PTT Public Company Limited
- List of oil spills
