= PTT Natural Gas Distribution Company Limited =

Thai natural gas distribution company, subsidiary of PTT Public Company Limited

- Native name: บริษัท ปตท.จำกัด (มหาชน) ธุรกิจทรัพยากรธรรมชาติและพัฒนาพลังงาน
- Type: Subsidiary
- Industry: Natural gas distribution
- Founded: 1996
- Headquarters: Bangkok, Thailand
- Products: Natural gas supply pipelines and services
- Parent: PTT Public Company Limited
- Website: PTT NGD

PTT Natural Gas Distribution Company Limited (commonly referred to as PTT NGD) is a Thai energy infrastructure company that develops, operates and maintains natural-gas distribution pipelines and related services for industrial and commercial customers. It is a major joint-venture subsidiary of PTT Public Company Limited (PTT) and Gulf Energy Development Public Company Limited (Gulf), operating in industrial zones throughout Thailand’s Eastern Economic Corridor (EEC), Bangkok/Metropolitan region and other major industrial provinces.

== History ==
PTT NGD was established in 1996 in response to Thailand’s growing industrial demand for natural gas and the government’s energy-policy shift from fuel oil to cleaner gas supply. The company initially focused on pipeline connections serving the Bang Pakong and Samut Prakan industrial zones, supplying gas for power generation and manufacturing. Throughout the 2000s, PTT NGD expanded its pipeline network into industrial estates in Chonburi, Rayong, Pathum Thani and Ayutthaya under the supervision of the Industrial Estate Authority of Thailand, and signed long-term contracts with independent power producers and small power producers (SPP) for gas-supply services.

In December 2020 Gulf Energy Development announced the acquisition of a 42 per cent stake in PTT NGD, leaving the share structure at PTT approximately 58 per cent and Gulf 42 per cent (with minor-stake holders completing the remainder).

== Operations ==
PTT NGD constructs and manages medium-pressure natural-gas distribution pipelines that connect to the Thailand national high-pressure transmission grid managed by PTT. Its services include designing and installing pipelines, pressure-control stations, metering systems and providing gas delivery for industrial boilers, turbines and cogeneration systems. As of 2025, the company reports more than 500 industrial clients served across over 12 provinces and operates over 500 km (310 mi) of distribution pipelines, with further expansion underway in Rayong, Chachoengsao and Prachinburi to support the EEC development plan.

== Infrastructure and projects ==
Key systems and projects operated by PTT NGD include the Bangkok Metropolitan Distribution Network supplying gas to industrial zones in Bang Pakong, Samut Prakan and Pathum Thani; and the Eastern Economic Corridor (EEC) Pipeline Project, a multiyear expansion linking Rayong and Chachoengsao provinces initiated in 2018 and due to complete in 2025. The company also partners with power-generation firms such as Ratch Group and Gulf Energy for dedicated gas-supply contracts to major plants including the Hin Kong Power Plant and Nong Saeng Power Station, contributing to Thailand’s central-region energy-supply security.

== Ownership and structure ==
PTT NGD is jointly owned by its two principal shareholders: PTT Public Company Limited holds approximately 58 per cent of the company, while Gulf Energy Development Public Company Limited holds about 42 per cent following its 2020 acquisition of shares from International Power S.A. The company is regulated by the Energy Regulatory Commission (Thailand) under the Energy Industry Act B.E. 2550 (2007) and related pipeline-distribution license frameworks.

== Environmental and policy context ==
PTT NGD supports Thailand’s national energy and climate goals by promoting natural gas as a transitional fuel for industry, aligned with the Thailand Power Development Plan 2018 and the Thailand National Energy Plan 2050. The company has introduced leak-detection systems, cathodic-protection programmes and pipeline-integrity monitoring as part of its infrastructure-safety and environmental-management initiatives.

== See also ==
- PTT Public Company Limited
- Gulf Energy Development Public Company Limited
- Natural gas in Thailand
- Energy policy of Thailand
- List of companies of Thailand
