= Café Amazon =

Thai multinational coffeehouse chain

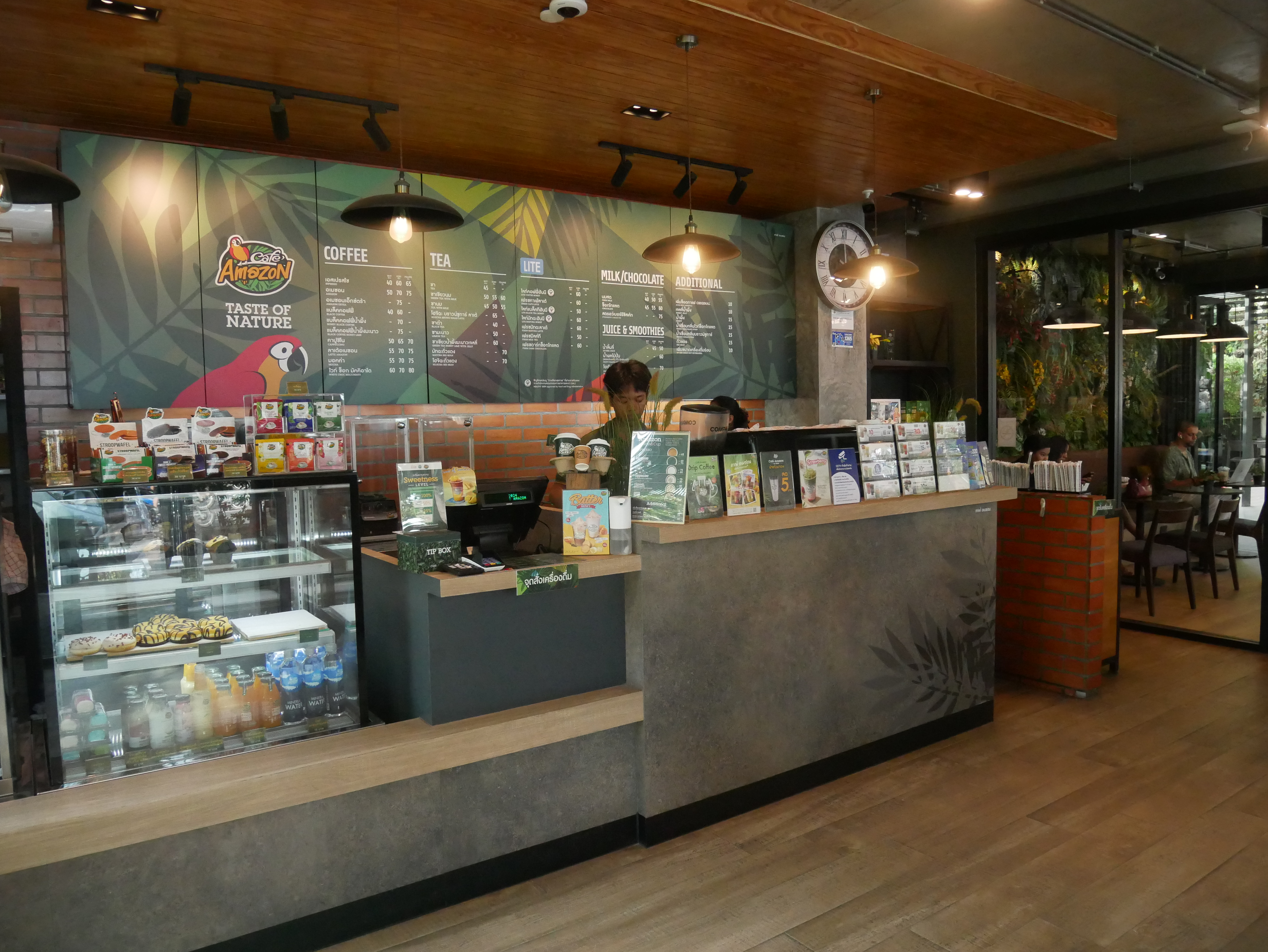
- Kiosk in Phuket
- Type: Subsidiary
- Industry: Restaurant
- Genre: Coffeehouse
- Founded: 2002; 24 years ago
- Headquarters: 555 Vibhavadi Rangsit Road, Chatuchak, Bangkok, Thailand
- Number of locations: 4,879 stores (2025)
- Area served: 10 countries
- Products: Coffee beverages; smoothies; tea; juice; baked goods
- Parent: PTT Public Company Limited
- Website: Official website

Café Amazon (Thai: คาเฟ่ อเมซอน) is a Thai multinational coffeehouse chain owned by PTT Public Company Limited, founded in 2002. The cafés are primarily found inside malls, in city centers, and gas stations.

There are more than 5,000 Café Amazon stores located around the world, making it the sixth-largest coffee chain by number of global outlets.

== History ==
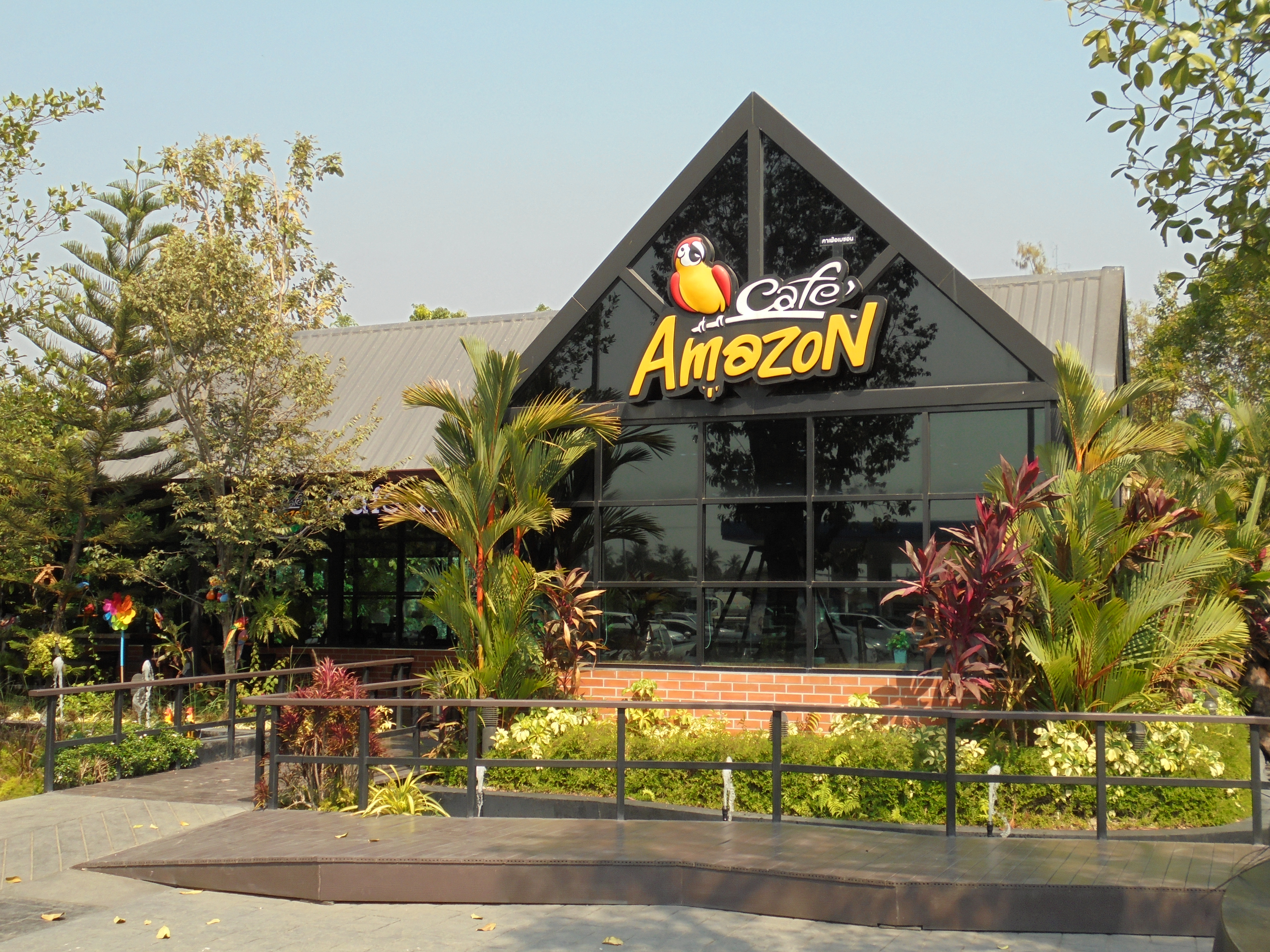
Full restaurant in Phlai Chumphon, Phitsanulok

Café Amazon was established in 2002 by the Thai oil and gas company PTT, with the intention to open coffee shops inside its gas stations nationwide. The first location was on Bangkok's Vibhavadi Rangsit Road. In keeping with the brand's idea of being a verdant "oasis" for visitors, the name "Café Amazon" was selected to conjure up images of the Amazon rainforest.

The cafés soon gained popularity and began to spread beyond gas stations to places like department stores, supermarkets, and independent roadside shops. In Thailand, the brand's revenue of 10.3 billion baht in 2018 overtook Starbucks' 7 billion. At the time, the market for coffee shops in Thailand was worth 21.2 billion baht. As of October 2025, the chain had more than 5,000 locations worldwide.

== Store formats and designs ==
The "Taste of Nature" concept is at the heart of the design of Café Amazon stores, which seeks to provide patrons with a tranquil and luxurious environment. The interiors of all Café Amazon locations, especially the standard shops, share some aspects, such as the utilization of black steel materials, bare steel ceilings, walls made of brick, or uncovered concrete walls.

Four primary store formats have been developed, including the company's flagship store next to the Ari BTS station in Bangkok; standard stores, which can be found in shopping centers, office buildings, and gas stations and which typically have both indoor and outdoor seating sections; to-go kiosks, found in busy places such as subway and Skytrain stations; and concept stores, which feature distinctive designs in addition to premium goods and menus.

== See also ==
- Coffee culture
- List of coffee companies
- List of largest companies in Thailand
