= My Name Is Ylona Garcia =

EP by Ylona Garcia
- Released: August 5, 2016
- Recorded: 2016
- Genre: OPM, pop
- Length: 31:00
- Language: Tagalog, English
- Label: Star Music

Singles from My Name Is Ylona Garcia
- 1. "Dahan Dahan Dahan Lang" Released: September 30, 2016; 2. "Fly Tonight" Released: April 28, 2017

My Name Is Ylona Garcia is the debut extended play by Filipino-Australian singer, actress and television personality Ylona Garcia. It was released and distributed on August 5, 2016, by Star Music. The EP is a collection of pop love and inspirational songs and it features nine tracks including the lead singles "Dahan Dahan Dahan Lang" and "Fly Tonight".

== Singles ==
"Dahan Dahan Dahan Lang" is the first single released in 2016. The song peaked at number 7 on the Pinoy MYX Countdown Chart and number 10 on the MYX Hit Chart.

"Fly Tonight" was the next single release. The song peak at number 3 on the Pinoy MYX Countdown Chart and peak at number 3 on the MYX Hit Chart. The song also earned Ylona her highest entry on both charts as a soloist.

== Promotions ==
"Dahan Dahan Dahan Lang" was promoted by Ylona Garcia through a performance on WISH 107.5 Radio on July 29, 2016.

"Fly Tonight" was promoted on iWant ASAP on January 5, 2019, followed by an appearance on Philippine morning show Umagang Kay Ganda on January 23, 2019.

== Commercial performance ==
"My Name Is Ylona Garcia" was certified for a gold record award on October 15, 2017 by the Philippine Association of the Record Industry certified award by the presence of its chairperson Atty. Marivic Benedicto, together with Star Music’s Jonathan Manalo and Rox Santos.

== Track listing ==
My Name Is Ylona Garcia (album) track list
No.	Title	Length
1.	"Prelude Intro (My Name Is Ylona Garcia)"	1:40
2.	"Not Yo Bae"	2:38
3.	"Stop Think"	4:13
4.	"Don't Say Goodbye"	4:18
5.	"Fly Tonight"	4:25
6.	"Each Day"	3:37
7.	"Stop the Bully"	3:18
8.	"Win the Fight"	3:09
9.	"Dahan Dahan Dahan Lang"	3:42
Total length:		31:00

== Release history ==
Release history of My Name Is Ylona Garcia
Country	Date	Format	Label
Various	August 5, 2016	Digital download; streaming	Star Music
Various	August 5, 2016	CD	Star Music
