= Islamic Bank of Thailand =

Bank of Thailand

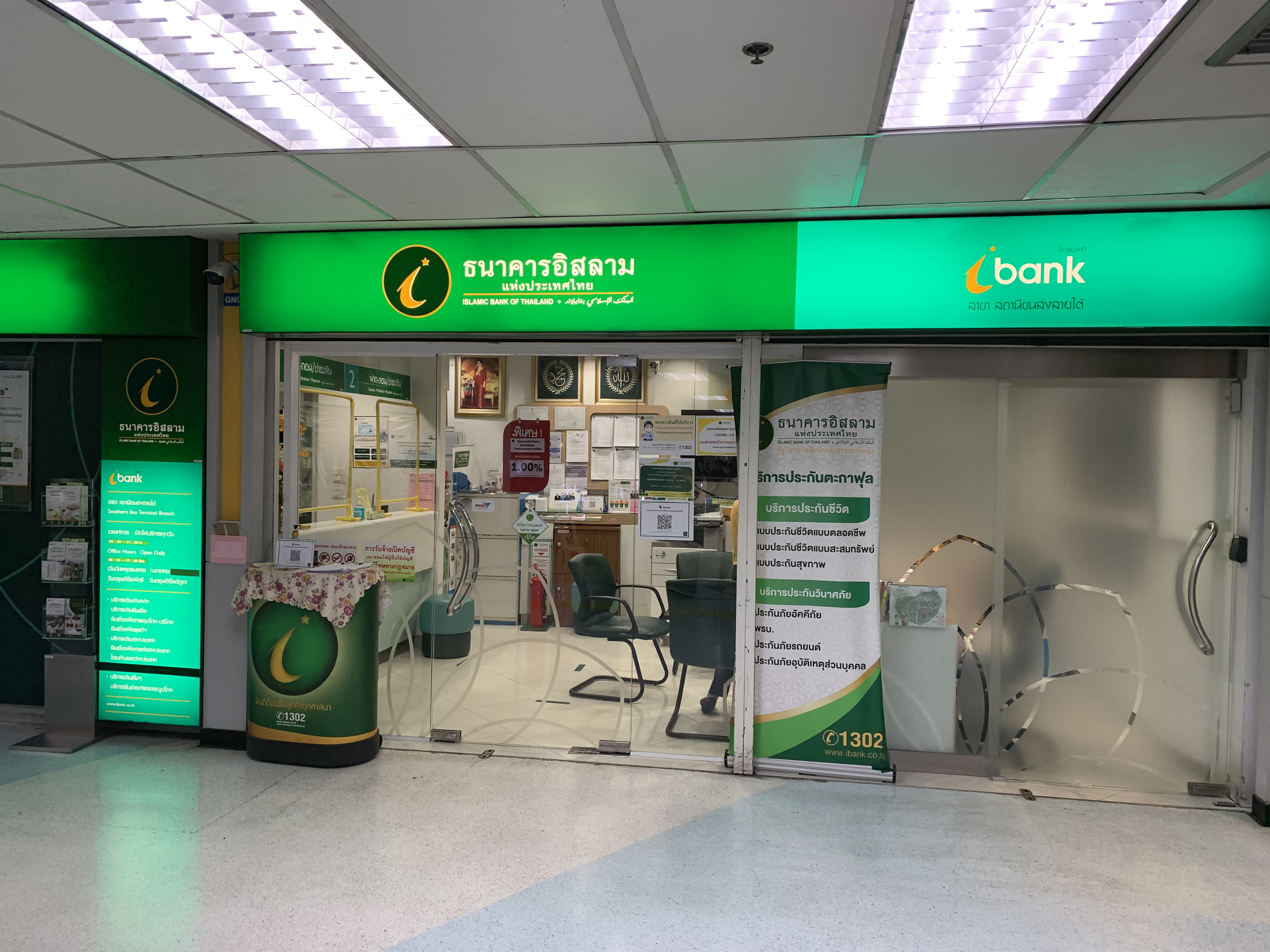
- A branch of Islamic Bank in Bangkok (2020)
- Native name: ธนาคารอิสลามแห่งประเทศไทย
- Type: State enterprise
- Industry: Islamic banking
- Founded: 21 October 2002; 23 years ago
- Headquarters: Watthana, Bangkok 10110, Thailand
- Number of locations: 108
- Area served: Thailand
- Key people: Monchai Rattanasatien, Acting Managing Director
- Net income: -9.5 billion baht
- Total assets: 109.7 billion baht
- Parent: Ministry of Finance
- Website: Official website

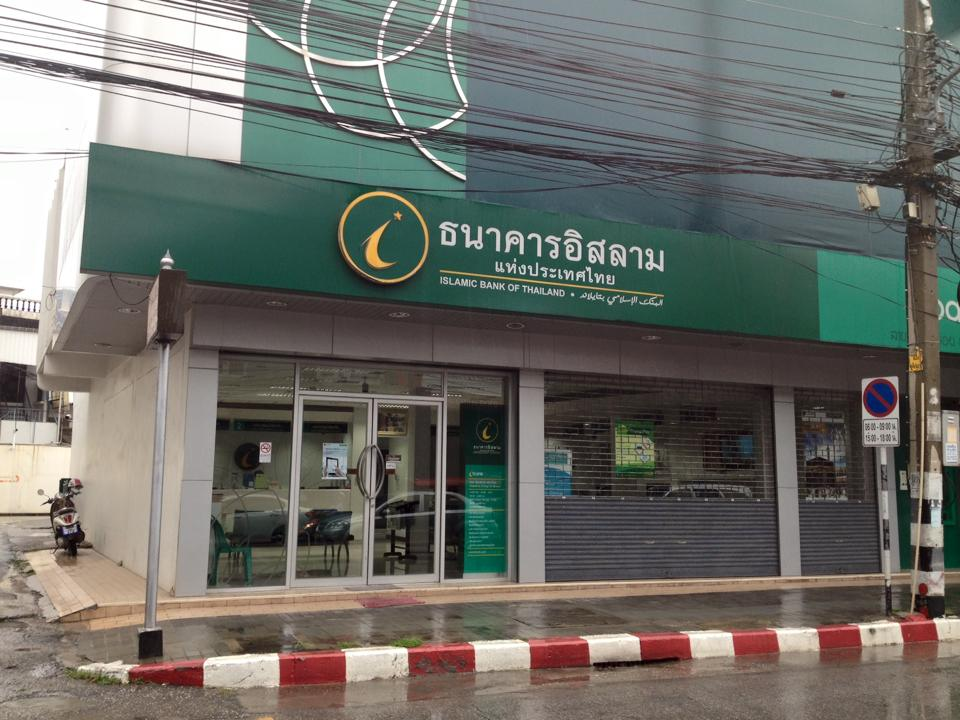
Islamic Bank of Thailand.

The Islamic Bank of Thailand (iBank) (Thai: ธนาคารอิสลามแห่งประเทศไทย, RTGS: Thanakhan Itsalam Haeng Prathet Thai) was established in 2002.

The bank is 48.54 percent owned by the Thai Ministry of Finance, 39.81 percent by the Government Savings Bank, and 9.83 percent by Krung Thai Bank. The Ministry of Finance's direct shareholding in iBank is capped at 49 percent, but shareholdings by other state-owned banks mean that the government controls over 98 percent of iBank shares.

iBank's Swift code is TIBTTHBK. The bank's fiscal year runs from 1 January to 31 December. iBank operates in accordance with the principles of Islamic Sharia law as practiced in Islamic banking and finance. It serves all customers regardless of religious affiliation.

== History ==
The Islamic Bank is a state-owned enterprise and has 130 branches throughout the country (2015). It is set up under the Islamic Bank of Thailand Act 2002. It began operations in 2003. By the end of 2005 the bank had total of nine branches. The bank acquired the Shariah Banking Services of Krung Thai Bank PCL in November 2005. As a result, the number of branches increased from 18 to 27.

== Performance ==
For the year ending 2014, iBank reported total assets of 109.7 billion baht. Net profit for the year was -9.5 billion baht.

== Bailout ==
The management competence of state-run financial institutions such as the Islamic Bank has been called into question by critics who point to the Finance Ministry's injection of almost 20 billion baht into iBank to raise its registered capital. The intervention was required because iBank had accrued 50 billion baht in non-performing loans (NPL), half of all its loan portfolio.
