= PTT Exploration and Production =

Thai petroleum company

PTT Exploration and Production Public Company Limited
- Native name: บริษัท ปตท.สำรวจและผลิตปิโตรเลียม จำกัด (มหาชน)
- Type: Public
- Traded as: SET: PTTEP
- ISIN: TH0355A10Z04
- Industry: Oil and Gas
- Founded: 20 June 1985; 41 years ago
- Headquarters: Bangkok, Thailand
- Area served: Worldwide
- Key people: Prajya Phinyawa (chairman); Montri Rawanchaikul (CEO)
- Revenue: ▲$5.240 billion USD (2018)
- Net income: ▲$1120 million USD (2018); 594 million USD (2017)
- Total assets: $19.22 billion USD (2017)
- Number of employees: 3,864 (2018)
- Parent: PTT Group
- Website: Official website

PTT Exploration and Production Public Company Limited (Thai: บริษัท ปตท.สำรวจและผลิตปิโตรเลียม จำกัด (มหาชน)), also known as PTTEP, is a national petroleum exploration and production company based in Thailand. It is a subsidiary of the state-owned PTT Public Company Limited. The company was founded on 20 June 1985.

PTTEP’s core business is petroleum exploration and production of in Thailand and foreign countries. As of June 30, 2018, PTTEP Group had 40 petroleum exploration and production projects in 11 countries; 16 projects in Thailand, 15 projects in Southeast Asia, 5 projects in Americas, 3 projects in Africa and 1 project in Australia.

== Products and services ==
- Petroleum including petroleum, crude, natural gas, condensate, liquified petroleum gas (LPG).
- Gas Transportation Pipeline
- Jetty and Warehouse: Petroleum Development Support Songkla Branch and Ranong Branch
- PTT Digital Solutions Company (PTT ICT)
- Energy Complex Company Limited
- PTTEP Services Limited
- PTT Global LNG Limited (PTT GL)
