= PTT Global Chemical =

Petrochemical company

PTT Global Chemical Public Company Limited
- Native name: บริษัท พีทีที โกลบอล เคมิคอล จำกัด (มหาชน)
- Type: Public
- Traded as: SET: PTTGC
- ISIN: TH1074010006
- Industry: Petrochemical
- Founded: October 19, 2011; 14 years ago
- Headquarters: 555/1 Energy Complex Building A 14th-18th floor, Chatuchak, Bangkok, Thailand,
- Key people: Narongsak Jivakanun (CEO); Predee Daochai (chairman)
- Products: Petroleum; aromatics; olefins; Polymers; High-volume specialties
- Revenue: ▼422,973.52 M฿ (2019)
- Net income: ▼11,682.08 M฿ (2019)
- Total assets: ▼452,514 M฿ (2019)
- Parent: PTT Group
- Website: Official website

PTT Global Chemical (Thai: บริษัท พีทีที โกลบอล เคมิคอล จำกัด (มหาชน)), also known as PTTGC, is a petrochemical company that specializes in synthesizing olefins and aromatics. It was founded in 2011 and is a subsidiary of PTT Public Company Limited.

It was listed on the top 10 Dow Jones Sustainability Indices (DJSI) for two consecutive years and is ranked 19th on the ICIS Top 100 Chemical Companies listing.

PTTGC owns and operates production support facilities, such as jetty and buffer tank farm services for liquid chemical, oil and gas. Minor activities are production and distribution of electricity, water, steam and other utilities.

In 2014, PTTGC Netherlands, a subsidiary of PTTGC, acquired part of French oil company Vencorex, totaling their stake in the company to 85%. This acquisition was completed to improve the production of Toluene diisocyanate (TDI) and Hexamethylene diisocyanate, along with their derivatives. These chemicals are used as feed stock in manufacturing polyurethanes, commonly used in foams and coatings for the automobile and construction industries.

The company operates in 8 business areas: Group Performance Center – Refinery and Shared Facilities; Group Performance Center – Aromatics; Group Performance Center – Olefins; Polymers Business Unit; EO-Based Performance Business Unit; Green Chemicals Business Unit; Phenol Business Unit; Performance Materials & Chemical Business Unit.

== Business Structure & Products ==
PTTGC owns and operates a refinery equipped with hydrocracker and visbreaker units, capable of converting low-value fuel oil to more valuable middle-distillate products. Its average refining capacity stands at 145,000 barrels per day of crude and 135,000 barrels per day of condensate.

Summary of refined products and their usage
Petroleum Product		Usage
Light Distillate	Liquefied Petroleum Gas (LPG)	-Fuel -Petrochemical feedstock (Olefins plants)
Light Distillate	Light Naphtha	-Gasoline blending component -Petrochemical feedstock (Olefins plants)
Light Distillate	Reformate	-Gasoline blending component -Petrochemical feedstock (Aromatics plants)
Middle Distillate	Jet Fuel	Aviation fuel
Middle Distillate	Diesel	Fuel for industrial and transport sectors
Heavy Distillate	Fuel Oil	Fuel for industrial sector and maritime transport

PTTGC produces and distributes aromatics products, namely paraxylene, benzene, orthoxylene, mixed xylene, toluene, and cyclohexane. These products are used as feedstock in various industrial processes.

Aside from these products, PTTGC's aromatics plants yield multiple by-products, including liquefied petroleum gas (LPG), light naphtha, heavy aromatics, and condensate residue. LPG and light naphtha are used as feedstock in their olefins plants, while heavy aromatics and condensate residue are used as feedstock in the refinery to produce jet fuel, diesel, and fuel oil.

Olefin products obtained from PTTGC's olefins plants mainly consist of ethylene and propylene. The olefin plants also yield various by-products, such as pyrolysis gasoline, mixed C4, tail gas, cracker bottom, and hydrogen.

Polymers are downstream petrochemicals primarily used as feedstock for everyday plastic products. They are commonly molded into multiple shapes and forms of plastic packaging. Polymers are also used as feedstock for other downstream industries.

Green chemicals are products manufactured from natural feedstocks such as palm oil, palm kernel oil, vegetable oil, animal fat, corn, sugar made from sugarcane, and cassava. These products can be used in various downstream industries, such as personal care, pharmaceuticals, food, biochemicals, and bioplastics industries.

Phenol is used as feedstock for the production of downstream products, such as engineering plastics. PTT Phenol Co.ltd is wholly owned by the PTT Global Chemical Co. ltd. or PTTGC since 2 May 2013.

Performance materials and chemicals are major components in downstream industries, such as the automotive, construction, and engineering plastic industries. In August 2006 PTT PLC became a shareholder of HMC Polymers and in 2017 transferred its share to its chemical flagship PTT Global Chemical Public Company Limited.

== Major shareholders ==
Updated 30 March 2020

Rank	Major Shareholders	# Shares	% Shares
1	PTT Public Company Limited	2,149,920,915	47.68%
2	Thai NVDR Company Limited	326,550,823	7.24%
3	State Street Bank Europe Limited	89,432,660	1.98%
4	HMC Polymers Company Limited	83,427,636	1.85%
5	South East Asia UK (Type C) Nominees Limited	81,415,493	1.81%
6	The Bank of New York Mellon	70,436,241	1.56%
7	Social Security Office	59,727,951	1.32%
8	Nortrust Nominees Limited-NT0 SEC Lending Thailand CL AC	54,853,168	1.22%
9	Bangkok Synthetics Company Limited	43,420,625	0.96%
10	State Street Bank and Trust Company	39,223,436	0.87%

== Sustainability ==
PTTGC have always pursued businesses with sustainability as commitment to balancing the economy, social and the environment, known as the Drive Sustainability Strategy. PTTGC have ranked in Chemical Sector by the Dow Jones Sustainability Indices (DJSI). Moreover, PTTGC are the only Thai business as a member of United Nations Global Compact at the LEAD level. In addition, PTTGC have won several awards on ESG (Environmental – Social – Governance) by many local and international investors and institutions, including SET Sustainability awards of Honor, and Morgan Stanley Capital International.
