= Export–Import Bank of Thailand =

State-owned Thai bank

- Head office of EXIM Bank in Phaya Thai, Bangkok
- Native name: ธนาคารเพื่อการส่งออกและนำเข้าแห่งประเทศไทย
- Type: State-owned
- Industry: Banking
- Headquarters: 1193 Phaholyothin Road, Samsen Nai, Phaya Thai, Bangkok 10400, Thailand
- Area served: Thailand
- Key people: Dr.Pasu Loharjun, Chairman; Dr.Rak Vorrakitpokatorn, President
- Net income: 1,516 million baht
- Total assets: 78,341 million baht
- Number of employees: 596 (December 2014)
- Parent: Ministry of Finance
- Website: Official website

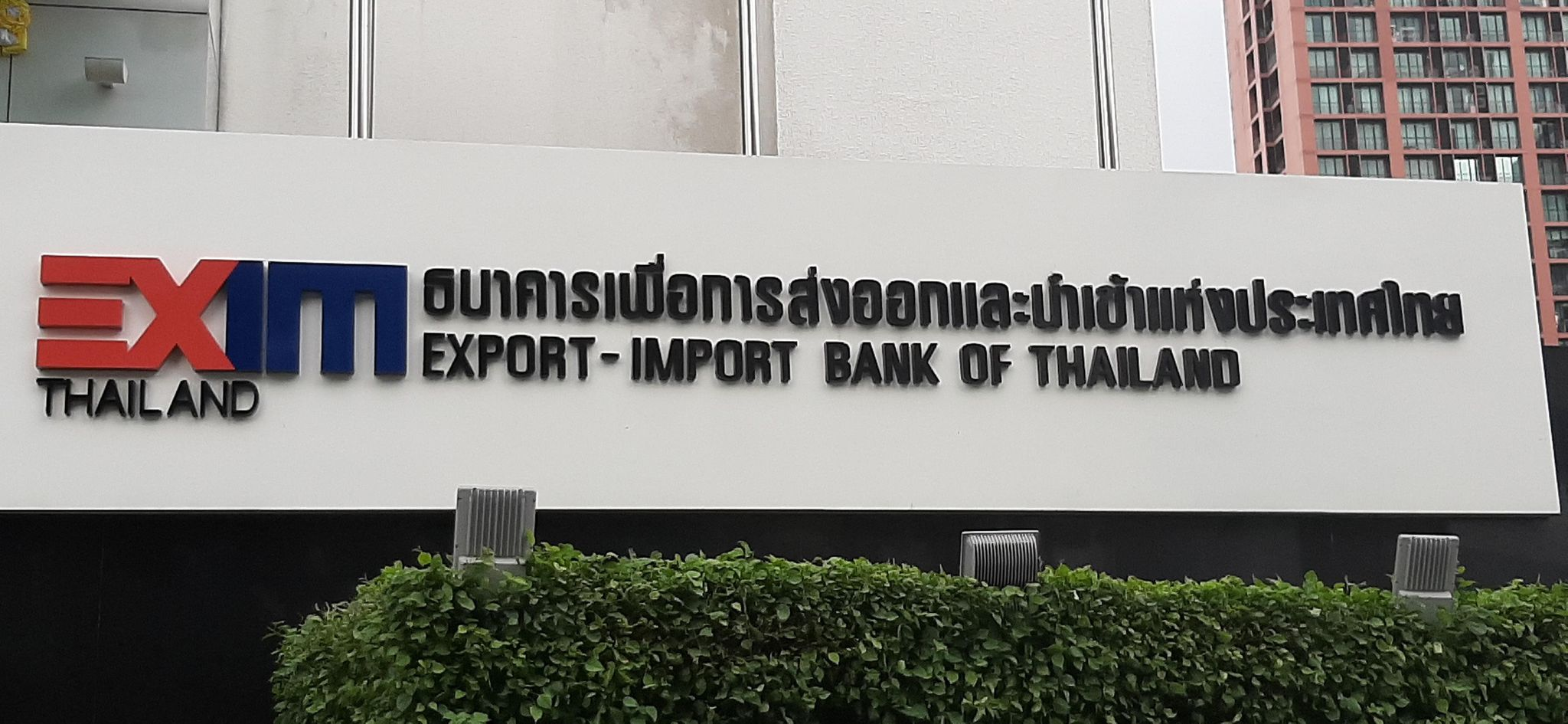
Export-Import Bank of Thailand-front sign

The Export–Import Bank of Thailand (EXIM Thailand, Thai: ธนาคารเพื่อการส่งออกและนำเข้าแห่งประเทศไทย (ธสน.)) is a state-owned bank headquartered in Bangkok, Thailand.

The bank's fiscal year runs from 1 January to 31 December.

== History ==
EXIM Thailand began operations on 17 February 1994. It was established with 2.5 billion baht in initial capital by the "Export–Import Bank of Thailand Act B.E. 2536 (1993)", which took effect on 7 September 1993.

Under the act, EXIM is permitted to engage in a range of business undertakings. EXIM Thailand can offer short-term as well as long-term credits, either in domestic or overseas markets, in baht or any foreign currency. The bank is empowered to borrow from local or overseas financial institutions, as well as issue short-term or long-term financial instruments for sale to financial institutions and the general public, both domestically and internationally. EXIM has the freedom to engage in any financial activities typical of commercial bank practices, except it cannot accept deposits from the general public.

In November 1999, the "Export–Import Bank of Thailand Act (No. 2) B.E. 2542 (1999)" was issued to clarify and expand the bank's scope of operation. The amendment enables EXIM to provide more comprehensive support to Thai investors overseas as well as local investors in businesses relating to export or businesses which earn or save foreign exchange.

== Mission ==
Provide financial support to Thai businesses, particularly small and medium-sized enterprises (SMEs), involved in international trade, with particular focus on the ASEAN Economic Community (AEC), to improve their access to financial resources. The cover of the EXIM annual report for 2014 states that, "EXIM Thailand provides financial support and risk protection for Thai exporters, importers and investors under the auspices of the government's strategic policies."

== Performance ==
As reported in the EXIM Annual Report 2014, the latest available as of January 2016, EXIM's total assets were 78,341 million baht, net profit was 1,516 million baht, and outstanding loans totaled 73,168 million baht.
