= GH Bank =

Thai state enterprise for mortgage lending

- Native name: ธนาคารอาคารสงเคราะห์
- Romanized name: thanakhan akhan songkhro
- Type: State enterprise
- Industry: Mortgage
- Founded: September 24, 1953; 72 years ago in Bangkok, Thailand
- Headquarters: Huai Khwang District, Bangkok, Thailand
- Area served: Thailand
- Key people: Mr.Akkaruth Sandhyananda (President)
- Services: Mortgage financing
- Parent: Ministry of Finance
- Website: Official website

GH Bank or Government Housing Bank (Thai: ธนาคารอาคารสงเคราะห์; RTGS: Thanakhan Akhan Songkhro, Thai initialism ธอส. tho-oso) is a state enterprise reporting to the Thai Finance Ministry. Founded in 1953, its mission is to extend mortgages to low-income earners.

== History ==
On 9 January 1953, King Bhumibol Adulyadej approved the Government Housing Bank Act, B.E. 2496. The act was published in the Government Gazette on 29 January 1953. The act established a government housing bank as a specialized financial institution. The bank opened for business on 24 September 1953, which is considered the date of its founding. On the occasion of the 40th anniversary year in 1993, the bank changed its logo to a stylised image of "two hands embracing a house". The GH Bank website became operational the same year.

== Operations ==
GH Bank is Thailand's largest mortgage lender. As of August 2019, it has 1.3 trillion baht in outstanding loans. Most of the bank's customers have loans up to two million baht; its largest loans are seven to eight million baht. In 2019 its loan approval target is 203 billion baht.

In 2019 GH Bank embarked on an initiative to increase its lending to high-income clients in addition to serving the low-income clients who are its reason for being.

GH Bank is one of the few Thai state enterprises that contributes money to the treasury rather than rely on government for funding.
