= PTT Public Company Limited =

Thai state-owned oil and gas company

- Native name: บริษัท ปตท. จำกัด (มหาชน)
- Type: Public
- Traded as: SET: PTT
- ISIN: TH0646010Z00
- Industry: Oil and gas industry
- Founded: 29 December 1978; 47 years ago (as Petroleum Authority of Thailand)
- Headquarters: 555 Vibhavadi Rangsit Rd, Chatuchak, Bangkok, Thailand
- Key people: Chatchai Phromlert (Chairman & Independent Director); Kongkrapan Intarajang (President & CEO)
- Products: Oil; natural gas; petrochemical
- Revenue: ▼US$ 90.4 billion (2023)
- Net income: ▲US$ 3.2 billion (2023)
- Total assets: US$ 100.7 billion (2023)
- Owner: Ministry of Finance (51.1%)
- Number of employees: 4,616 (PTT); 24,680 (subsidiaries)
- Parent: Ministry of Energy
- Subsidiaries: PTT Exploration and Production; PTT Natural Gas Distribution Company Limited; PTT Global Chemical Public Company Limited; PTT Oil and Retail Business; Thai Oil; IRPC; Global Power Synergy; Dhipaya Insurance; PTT Philippines Corporation
- Website: www.pttplc.com

PTT Public Company Limited (Thai: บริษัท ปตท. จำกัด (มหาชน)) is a Thai state-owned SET-listed petroleum and natural gas company. Formerly known as the Petroleum Authority of Thailand, it owns extensive submarine gas pipelines in the Gulf of Thailand, a network of LPG terminals throughout the kingdom, and it is involved in electricity generation, petrochemical products, oil and gas exploration and production, and gasoline retailing businesses. The company also owns Café Amazon, a popular coffee chain throughout Southeast Asia, which shops are often located next to PTT gas stations or inside malls.

Affiliated companies include PTT Exploration and Production, PTT Global Chemical, PTT Asia Pacific Mining, and PTT Green Energy.

On 15 December 2022, the world's largest institutional investor the Norwegian Government Pension Fund Global divested from PTT and its subsidiary PTT Oil and Retail Business PCL (PTTOR) due to "unacceptable risk that the companies contribute to serious violations of individuals’ rights in situations of war or conflict".

== History ==
PTT traces its origins to 1978, when Thailand sought greater energy independence following the global oil crises of the 1970s. On 29 December 1978, the government of Prime Minister Kriangsak Chamanan established the Petroleum Authority of Thailand (PTT) as a state-owned enterprise to oversee petroleum exploration, imports, refining, and national fuel distribution.

PAT was created through the consolidation of the Thai Fuel Organization (Thai: องค์การเชื้อเพลิง) under the Defense Energy Department and the Thai Natural Gas Organization (Thai: องค์การก๊าซธรรมชาติแห่งประเทศไทย) under the Ministry of Industry to form a single national energy enterprise.

Between 1981 and 1983 PAT built Thailand's first natural-gas transmission pipeline linking the Erawan and Bongkot gas fields in the Gulf of Thailand to the power plants at Bang Pakong and South Bangkok. This marked the beginning of Thailand's domestic gas-based electricity generation. In 1985 PAT opened the Bangchak oil refinery in Bangkok and expanded its downstream distribution business by establishing a nationwide network of service stations under the "PTT" brand. In 1988 it began development of the onshore gas-separation plants at Map Ta Phut in Rayong Province, providing feedstock for the country's emerging petrochemical industry. By the mid-1990s PAT had completed additional pipeline extensions to the Eastern Seaboard and southern provinces, integrated joint-venture refineries at Rayong and Sriracha, and become the country's dominant energy supplier.

To modernize the state-enterprise sector and attract private investment, the government corporatized PAT under the State Enterprise Corporatization Act B.E. 2542 (1999). On 1 October 2001 it was officially re-registered as PTT Public Company Limited (PTT PCL), with the Ministry of Finance as majority shareholder on behalf of the Thai state. Two months later, in December 2001, PTT was listed on the Stock Exchange of Thailand in what was then the country's largest initial public offering, raising approximately 29 billion baht (about US $700 million).

== Financials ==
For 2016, PTT PCL reported revenues of 1,737,148 million baht, net income of 94,609 million baht, assets of 2,232,331 million baht, and total equity of 762,948 million baht.

PTT's 15 directors were compensated with 14.9 million baht in meeting allowances in 2016, plus 38.7 million baht in bonuses. The president and CEO's salary for the year was 30.6 million baht plus a 9.6 million baht bonus. The company in 2016 employed 4,616 (PTT) and 24,680 at subsidiaries. Total compensation for PTT employees in 2016, excluding top management, was 9,651 million baht.

== Operations ==
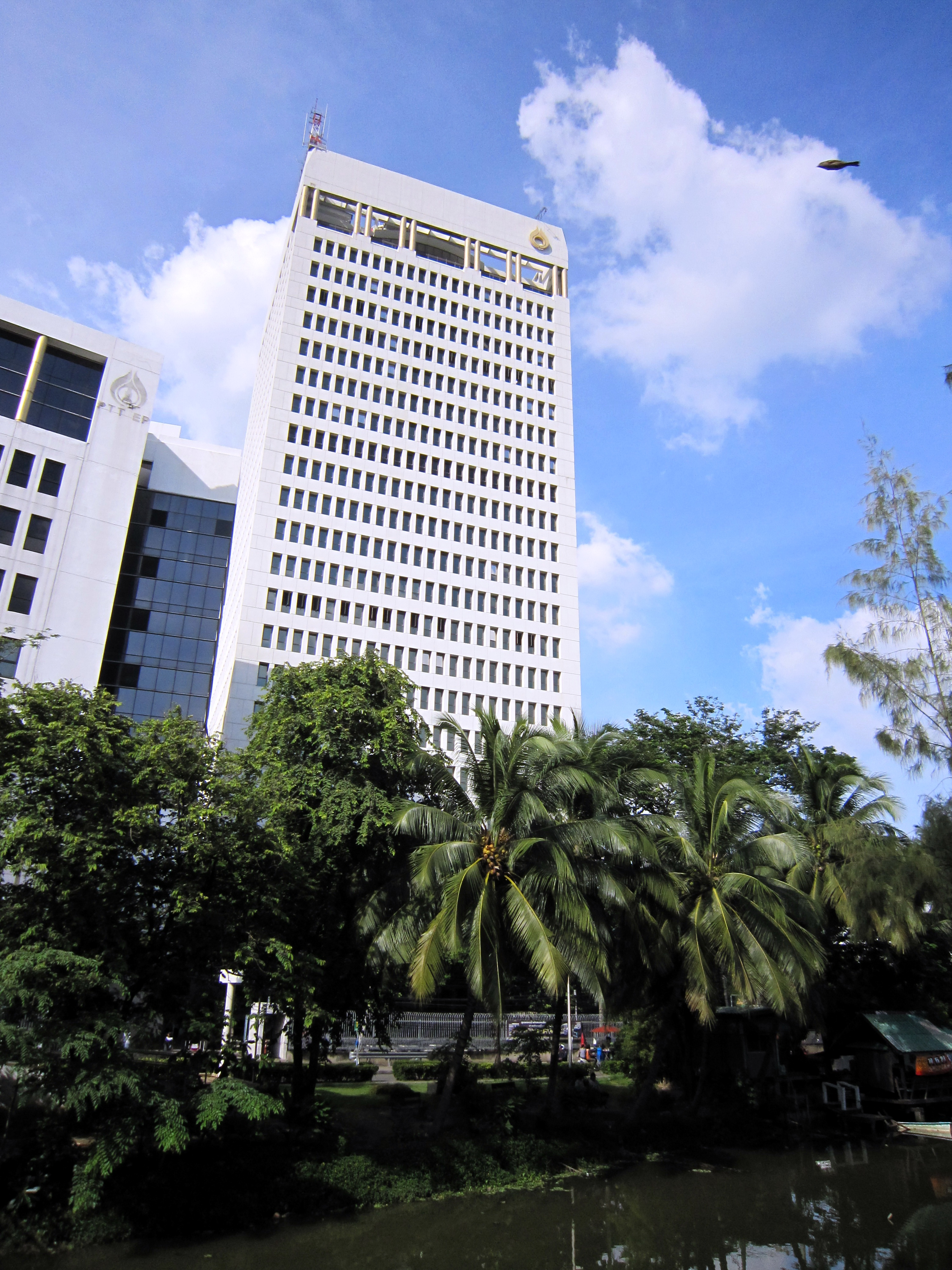
PTT Headquarters at Bangkok

In 2012, PTT purchased the remaining 55 percent of Sakari Resources, a Singaporean coal mine operator.

In 2012, PTT Exploration and Production (PTTEP) took over Cove Energy plc, which owned an 8.5 percent share in a huge natural-gas field offshore Mozambique.

The company operates 58 retail stations in the Philippines and plans to add an additional 15-20 petrol stations in Luzon and the Visayas, in Cebu Province.

PTT Public Company Limited and Pertamina, Indonesia's state-owned oil company, partnered to build a new petrochemical complex in Indonesia for an estimated cost of US$4–5 billion.

=== Vencorex ===
Vencorex is a joint venture between PTT Global Chemical and the Perstorp Group, created in 2012, based in France's Rhône-Alpes region. It is the owner of technology and a major manufacturer of isocyanates, particularly toluene diisocyanate (TDI), hexamethylene diisocyanate (HDI, IPDI) and its derivatives.

== Controversies ==
=== Oil spills ===
The 2009 Montara oil spill, 250 kilometres (160 mi) off Australia's northwestern coast led to "thousands of barrels of oil gushed into the ocean over a 10-week period following a blowout at PTTEP Australasia's West Atlas rig in the Timor Sea". The Australian unit of PTT Exploration and Production (PTTEP) "admitted to four charges" in the 2009 spill.

The 2013 Rayong oil spill started on the night of 28 July 2013. An oil leak (from a pipeline) 35 kilometres (22 mi) from Ko Samet's Ao Phrao Beach, resulted in the beach being closed and its tourists evacuated after spillage reached the beach. The crude oil spill had occurred 20 kilometres (12 mi) off Thailand's mainland, "when a floating hose transferring oil from a tanker to a PTT refinery pipeline broke sending 50,000 litres of oil spewing into the coastal waters". On 7 August 2013 media said that the Department of Special Investigation had seized an oil supply line, suspected of being faulty.

=== Myanmar military ===
PTT, as Myanmar's largest corporate investor, has made significant investments in Myanmar's offshore gas, importing all of natural gas from three of Myanmar's four offshore projects. PTT pays US$500 million per year to the state-owned Myanma Oil and Gas Enterprise (MOGE), directly benefiting the military junta, the State Administration Council since the 2021 Myanmar coup d'état. Thailand has reportedly lobbied against U.S. sanctions on MOGE, which is the largest source of foreign currency for the Burmese regime. In December 2022, the Government Pension Fund of Norway divested from its equity stake in PTT and its subsidiary, PTT Oil and Retail Business, due to its human rights concerns regarding PTT's partnership with the Burmese military.

PTT also operates a joint venture with the military-owned Myanmar Economic Corporation (MEC), paying rent to MEC to operate a fuel terminal in Thilawa Port, on land seized from farmers. Human Rights Watch and other NGOs have called for PTT to end its business investments with Myanmar's military enterprises.

=== Rolls-Royce bribery case ===
In an action by the US Department of Justice (DOJ) against aircraft engine-maker Rolls-Royce, the DOJ claimed that Rolls-Royce had paid more than US$11 million in commissions to win a deal with Thai Airways, aware that some of the funds would be used to bribe officials at PTT and its subsidiary, PTT Exploration and Production (PTTEP). The payments were made from 2003-2013 and related to contracts for equipment and after-market products and services. Admitting its guilt, Rolls-Royce paid US$170 million to settle the case. PTT vowed to investigate. Subsequently, PTT Chairman and CEO Tevin Vongvanich said that the company was unable to find anyone who "allegedly took bribes".

== Green energy ==
In November 1993, former Thai prime minister Anand Panyarachun established the Thailand Business Council for Sustainable Development. In 2010, PTT President and CEO Prasert Bunsumpun announced that PTT would expand into producing more renewable energy.

PTT has many subsidiaries, including PTTGC, TOP, BCP, and PTTEP, all of which are working towards producing more environmentally friendly energy. In 2014, Bangchak Petroleum completed its Sunny Bangchak project, a 38-megawatt silicon photovoltaic power plant, the largest of its kind in Southeast Asia. In September 2014, Thai Oil Public Company Limited (TOP), another PTT subsidiary, was recognized as a leader in business sustainability by the Dow Jones Sustainability Index. Thai Oil (TOP) has proven to be an environmentally friendly company, with no reported violations of environmental laws.

The company also produces and distributes ethanol from sugarcane through various channels like Maesod Clean Energy, Sapthip, and Ubon Bio Ethanol. In August 2014, PTT Global Chemical (PTTGC) along with Diary Home and NatureWorks, announced their eco-friendly Ingeo bioplastics yoghurt cup. PTTGC seeks to become a major player in bio-based chemicals.
