= Bank for Agriculture and Agricultural Co-operatives =

Thai state enterprise for agricultural loan

- Native name: ธนาคารเพื่อการเกษตรและสหกรณ์การเกษตร
- Type: State enterprise
- Industry: Banking
- Predecessor: Bank for Cooperatives
- Founded: 1 November 1966; 59 years ago
- Headquarters: 2346 Phahon Yothin Road, Sena Nikhom, Chatuchak, Bangkok 10900, Thailand
- Number of locations: 1327 branches; 1074 service points; 2001 ATMs
- Area served: Thailand
- Key people: Julapun Amornvivat (Chairman)
- Net income: 10,368 million baht
- Total assets: 1,431,040 million baht
- Number of employees: 18,372
- Parent: Ministry of Finance
- Website: www.baac.or.th/baac_en/index.php

The Bank for Agriculture and Agricultural Cooperatives (BAAC) (Thai: ธนาคารเพื่อการเกษตรและสหกรณ์การเกษตร (ธ.ก.ส.)) was established in 1966. The bank is 99.79 percent owned by the Thai Ministry of Finance. BAAC's Swift code is BAABTHBK. BAAC's fiscal year runs from 1 April to 31 March.

== History ==
BAAC was established on 1 November 1966 as a government-owned bank to provide affordable credit to agricultural producers, either directly or through agricultural cooperatives and farmers' associations. BAAC assumed the functions of the Bank for Cooperatives (which had been established in 1947). In March 1993, BAAC was also authorized to lend to farmers for agriculturally-related activities, e.g., cottage industries, and more recently, for non-agricultural activities.

== Performance ==
For the fiscal year 2014 ending 31 March 2015, BAAC reported total assets of 1,431,040 million baht and a net profit of 10,368 million baht. The bank had 1,327 branches, 1,074 service bureaus, 2,001 ATMs, and 18,372 employees.
