= Government Savings Bank (Thailand) =

State-owned Thai bank headquartered in Phaya Thai District, Bangkok

- Native name: ธนาคารออมสิน
- Type: State enterprise
- Industry: Banking
- Predecessor: Savings office
- Founded: 1 April 1913; 113 years ago
- Founder: King Vajiravudh (Rama VI)
- Headquarters: 470 Phaholyothin Road, Samsennai, Phaya Thai, Bangkok 10400, Thailand
- Number of locations: 1,052 branches; 9977 ATMs; 152 service units; 972 school banks
- Key people: Theeraj Athanavanich (Chairman); Vithai Rattanakorn (President/CEO)
- Operating income: 26,919 million baht
- Total assets: 2.62 trillion baht (2017)
- Owner: Ministry of Finance
- Number of employees: 15,366
- Website: Official website

Government Savings Bank (GSB) (Thai: ธนาคารออมสิน : Aomsin Bank) is a state-owned Thai bank headquartered in Phaya Thai District, Bangkok. GSB's Swift code is GSBATHBK.

== History ==
King Vajiravudh (Rama VI) introduced a means to save money in Thailand in 1913. His purpose was to introduce Thai people to banking services and to promote a habit of thrift and saving. King Vajiravudh issued an act, effective 1 April 1913, to formally set up a "Savings Office" which began its operations under the Royal Treasury.

In 1929, in a period of economic depression, King Rama VII permitted the transfer of the bank to the Post and Telegraph Department of the Ministry of Commerce and Transportation (Currently using the name Office of the National Broadcasting and Telecommunications Commission) to make it more convenient for citizens. The bank established new businesses such as travel savings, capital accumulation savings, and house deposit savings. By the end of 1936, a total of 104 branches of the Government Savings Bank were around the country. After World War II, the government, recognizing the benefits of savings as well as the role that the Savings Office played in financial development, transformed it into a juristic person, to be operated independently under the supervision of a board of directors appointed by the finance minister as mandated by the Government Savings Bank Act B.E. 2489 (1946). The office was renamed the Government Savings Bank (GSB), effective 1 April 1947.

GSB is now a juristic person and state enterprise operating as a financial institution guaranteed by the government under the supervision of the Ministry of Finance. GSB operates 1,141 branches throughout the country.

== Performance ==
The bank showed total assets of 2,259,016 million baht as of 31 December 2014, ranked number four in the Thai banking sector. Net profit was 22,231 million baht, increasing 322 million baht or 1.5 percent over the previous year.
