= Krungthai Bank =

State-owned bank in Thailand

- Native name: ธนาคารกรุงไทย
- Type: Public
- Traded as: SET: KTB
- ISIN: TH0150010Z03
- Industry: Banking
- Founded: 14 March 1966; 60 years ago
- Headquarters: Wattana, Bangkok, Thailand
- Area served: Thailand; Cambodia; Laos; India
- Key people: Lavaron Sangsnit (chairman); Payong Srivanich (president)
- Revenue: ▼117,221.1 million baht (2018)
- Net income: ▲31,089.3 million baht (2018)
- Total assets: ▼2,739,203.2 million baht (2018)
- Total equity: ▲314,1413.1 million baht (2018)
- Number of employees: 29,226 (2018)
- Website: Official website

Krungthai Bank (Thai: ธนาคารกรุงไทย; RTGS: Thanakhan Krung Thai), officially Krungthai Bank Public Company Limited, and sometimes known by its initials KTB, is a Thai commercial bank whose majority shareholder is the Financial Institutions Development Fund (FIDF), a state-managed fund under the Bank of Thailand. Its SWIFT code is KRTHTHBK.

== History ==
The bank came into being on 14 March 1966 following the merger of two government-owned banks, Kaset Bank and Monton Bank. The merged banks were then named "Krungthai Bank Limited", bearing its logo as an image of the Vayupaksa bird — a mythical creature that feeds on winds — which is also used by the Ministry of Finance.

On 2 August 1989, Krungthai Bank was the first state enterprise to list its shares on the Stock Exchange of Thailand (SET). Its major shareholder is the Ministry of Finance through a shareholding of 6,184 billion shares by the Financial Institutions Development Fund (FIDF), accounting for 55.31 percent of total shares.

In addition to commercial banking activities, Krungthai Bank has served as a channel for financial services in support of governmental initiatives. It does this by lending to businesses of certain types, such as One Tambon One Product (OTOP) loans, ICT computer loans, and educational loans. Moreover, the bank is used by most government agencies for disbursements. For example, the revenue department issues tax refunds via Krungthai cheque and it handles disbursement of government funds such as pension payments.

During Thailand's economic crisis, the bank supported the government policy of stimulating the national economy by providing the "Thai Khem Kheng Stimulus Package 2012" to boost liquidity.

In 2016, Krungthai was selected as "Best Trade Finance Provider in Thailand 2016" by Global Finance magazine based on input from industry analysts, corporate executives and technology experts. Criteria for choosing the winners included: transaction volume, scope of global coverage, customer service, competitive pricing and innovative technologies.

As of February 2017, Krungthai has the largest number of domestic branches of any Thai bank, 1,210.

In January 2018, Krungthai NEXT and PaoTang was set its first launch and this service was made by Krungthai Bank. PaoTang is an opened application to all Thai citizens not only Krungthai’s customers, while Krungthai NEXT is limited to those who have Krungthai Bank accounts. PaoTang is a mobile payment and digital wallet. It lets the users make payments by using compatible phones and other devices. Moreover, it is an online platform that help Thai receive money in all projects from the Thai Government.

As of May 2024, Krungthai Bank has 924 domestic branches, the largest number of any commercial bank in Thailand. It has 7,200 ATM machines around the country, ranked 4th behind SCB, BBL, and KBank respectively.

== Overseas branches ==
The bank has branches in Phnom Penh and Siem Reap (sub-branch) in Cambodia, Vientiane in Laos, and Mumbai in India. The bank also has wholesale banking branches in Kunming, Los Angeles and Singapore.
