= Lebanese political crisis (2019–present) =

Lebanon has faced severe decline in recent years, leading to widespread disillusionment across its sectarian groups. After gaining independence in 1943, Lebanon established a sectarian power-sharing system, dividing key government roles among its religious groups. While intended to ensure balance, this system has fostered corruption, patronage, and political fragmentation. Political elites often distribute positions for loyalty rather than merit, leading to a culture of impunity and widespread misuse of state resources, including "ghost employees" to secure support.

Ranked 112th on the Human Development Index, Lebanon is facing severe economic and political instability. The 2019 liquidity crisis, compounded by corruption and disasters like the 2020 Beirut explosion, led to a collapse of the currency, widespread poverty, and resource shortages. With a caretaker government and a currency that has lost 97% of its value, the country struggles to provide basic services.

Hezbollah, a Lebanese militant and political group, has long been aligned with Iran, raising concerns that its domestic actions serve Iranian regional goals. While enjoying strong support within Lebanon's Shiite community, Hezbollah faces opposition from those critical of its ties to Iran and its role in regional conflicts, especially in Syria, where its support for the former Assad regime has drawn criticism from both Lebanese rivals and fellow Shiite figures. Once seen as Lebanon's defender, Hezbollah has faced scandals and growing internal and external criticism. Allegations of corruption and accusations of looting in 2013, have damaged its image. Internationally, its support for Syria's former Assad regime and military actions have led to sanctions and declining popularity, particularly in the Gulf. Within Lebanon, while Hezbollah maintains strong support among Shiites, overall trust in the group has decreased, with many Lebanese expressing distrust and dissatisfaction with its regional involvement. The group's rise to power has involved political violence, including high-profile assassinations and targeted killings of critics executed by Unit 121. Hezbollah's dominance has raised concerns about its influence over Lebanon's politics and its role in the Syrian Civil War. In October 2019, widespread protests in Lebanon criticized Hezbollah and its allies for corruption and economic decline, Hezbollah were also the focus of additional protests after the 2020 Beirut port explosion, ultimately leading to the resignation of the entire Lebanese Cabinet. Hezbollah's financial resources, including unlicensed banking and Iranian cash shipments, were heavily impacted in 2024. The group suffered significant leadership losses from Israeli airstrikes, including the death of Hassan Nasrallah, which severely weakened its structure and influence, leading to predictions of its long-term decline.

Amid Lebanon's crisis, there is an opportunity to rebuild the country with effective institutions and a unified army, free from sectarianism. Experts like David Ramadan and Bilal Ramez believe that weakening Hezbollah, electing a consensus president, and disarming the group could restore Lebanon's stability, strengthen the army, and end Iranian influence.

== Background ==
Lebanon was once considered one of the more prosperous and developed countries in the Arab world, despite lacking significant oil resources, and has experienced a severe decline in recent years, leading to widespread frustration and disillusionment among its population, spanning all sectarian groups.

First granted in the Sykes–Picot Agreement between Britain and France, and implemented fully as result of the French victory in the Franco-Syrian War, Greater Lebanon was put under French mandate on 24 July 1922.

In 1943 Lebanon gained independence from France, and established its political structure on a sectarian power-sharing arrangement. The resulting constitution ensures that all 18 recognized religious sects in the country are represented within the government, the military, and civil service. In this system, the three principal government roles—the presidency, and the roles of prime minister, and speaker of the parliament—are allocated to a Maronite Christian, a Sunni Muslim, and a Shia Muslim, respectively. While this arrangement was initially intended to ensure sectarian balance, it has led to a number of systemic issues. The structure was primarily conceived as a division of power among the political elites of the time, rather than as a means to establish effective governance.

Consequently, Lebanon's political system has become characterized by weakness, corruption, and patronage. Power brokers within the system often distribute government positions to secure loyalty, rather than to reward merit or competence. The sectarian system exacerbates divisions between religious groups, leading to competition for control over valuable government ministries and resources.

This has resulted in a fragmented governmental structure, where various sectarian factions operate more like competing "bureaucratic fiefdoms" rather than a cohesive administration governing the state. The Lebanese state is permeated with corruption, and a culture of impunity prevails. Political parties frequently exploit state institutions as sources of personal income, and rival sects either engage in or tolerate corrupt practices in order to preserve a system that benefits their interests. Additionally, politicians direct public resources to their supporters through their control over governmental departments, and are even involved in the creation of "ghost employees"—nonexistent positions that allow politicians to pocket salaries or distribute funds to promote loyalty among their followers.

== Financial crisis ==
Lebanon is a developing country, ranked 112th on the Human Development Index. It has been classified as an upper-middle-income state. The Lebanese liquidity crisis, coupled with nationwide corruption and disasters such as the 2020 Beirut explosion, precipitated the collapse of Lebanon's currency and fomented political instability, widespread resource shortages, and high unemployment and poverty. The World Bank has defined Lebanon's economic crisis as one of the world's worst since the 19th century.

The absence of a functioning president has left Lebanon with a caretaker government, deepening the political and economic instability that began in 2019. According to the World Bank, the economic collapse is one of the worst in the past 150 years, pushing millions of Lebanese citizens into poverty. Government institutions, weakened by years of corruption and political impasse, have struggled to address the growing crisis, including the challenges posed by the ongoing conflict in the region.

Lebanon's economy has been severely impacted by the collapse of its currency, which has lost 97% of its value against the U.S. dollar since 2019, making government salaries almost completely devoid of value. The state's ability to provide basic services has deteriorated, with most citizens relying on private generators due to frequent power outages.

In 2022, the Lebanese government and the International Monetary Fund (IMF) decided upon an economic assistance package amounting billions of dollars, in support of Lebanon. However, the disbursement of these funds is dependent on the execution of a series of complex economic reforms aimed at improving financial and political transparency in Lebanon. Despite this agreement, over 80 percent of the population now lives in multidimensional poverty due to the slow implementation of these reforms by the government.

According to a survey conducted by the Arab barometer, approximately 80 percent of citizens report that the availability and affordability of food are significant concerns. Sixty-eight percent have indicated that they have occasionally or frequently had no food left before they were able to purchase more. From the seven countries surveyed since September 2023, all predominantly Arab, respondents from Lebanon expressed the lowest satisfaction levels in the region regarding access to essential services such as water, electricity, internet, and healthcare. Lebanese participants also reported the highest frequency of electricity outages, with 92 percent experiencing weekly interruptions—43 percentage points higher than the next most affected region, the Palestinian territories, surveyed before October 7 2023. Similarly, 65 percent of Lebanese citizens who responded to the survey reported weekly water shortages, a figure 17 percentage points higher than the next most affected region, again the Palestinian territories.

Amid these conditions, infrastructure has become increasingly fragile. According to Amin Salam, the Lebanese minister of economy and trade, communications and transportation networks are in decline, and together with the vulnerability of the country's ports and airports, Lebanon is at risk of becoming completely isolated.

== Fuel and energy crisis ==
Power in Lebanon is largely dependent on a single service provider, Electricité du Liban (EDL), which generates and distributes electricity for the entire country. However, a number of privately owned distributors of electricity generated by EDL also exist as does a huge number of privately owned diesel generators supplying low voltage electricity to local households.

Technical and financial mismanagement of the EDL has been well documented, in 2018 EDL supplied only 63% of the demand for electricity resulting in prolonged power outages, especially in times of peak demand. EDL has witnessed both severe technical losses, reflecting infrastructure of poor quality, inadequate system maintenance and misuse of resources; and a high level of non-technical losses, indicating theft, favour giving in the form of free electricity, lack of governance and insufficient law enforcement. EDL has further failed to collect payments from the public sector, some of which are large consumers such as the Water Institutions, this is due to insufficient administrative staff, various crises and other technical issues. As a result, EDL has reduced energy generation, with the goal of minimizing losses. According to Diwan and Haidar, the prolonged underperformance of EDL has been facilitated by Lebanese political elites who benefit from the status quo.

One of the outcomes of the Lebanese financial crisis was a severe fuel shortage which began in May 2021, due to the government's inability to fund the import of fuel. During the same month Turkey's Karpowership, which previously supplied Lebanon with as much as 370 megawatts (MW), or a quarter of Lebanon's power supply, shut down its generators after an 18-month period for which it was not paid. In October 2021 the state electricity company shut down the two main power plants in Lebanon, the Zahrani and the Deir Ammar power stations, because of fuel shortage, which reduced the total state supplied power to less than 270 megawatts.

The fuel and energy crisis affected multiple sectors, including the humanitarian sector. Fuel and electricity shortages in Lebanon led to a reduction in operations at the country's largest hospitals. These shortages have also affected the public water supply and wastewater treatment systems, resulting in millions of people losing access to public water services, thus posing significant risks to public and environmental health.

== Political deadlock ==
Since the October 2019 protests, Lebanon has plunged deeper into a complex state of political and economic collapse. Triggered by a long-building economic crisis, the protests reflected widespread public discontent with the sectarian political elite, who have governed the country with little reform since the civil war's end. Despite calls for change and international recommendations, particularly from the IMF. Lebanon's political class has refused structural reforms, opting instead for a strategy of inaction to preserve their positions. This has prevented critical financial aid, such as the €11 billion pledged at the 2018 CEDRE conference, from being released.

Since the conclusion of President Michel Aoun's term in 2022, Lebanon has been situated in a political deadlock. The Lebanese government has been unable to elect a new president due to Hezbollah's parliamentary opposition to all candidates who are not aligned with the group. This has left the country in a leadership vacuum, exacerbating its ongoing economic crisis. In June 2023, after the Lebanese parliament failed for the twelfth time to elect a new head of state, protests erupted, targeting banks and political figures.

The ongoing political and economic crises in Lebanon have led to widespread disillusionment with both the government and religious authorities. Lebanese citizens report the lowest levels of trust in Political figures and organizations among the countries surveyed by Arab Barometer. Ninety percent of respondents say they have severe distrust of their government, parliament, president, or prime minister, and 94 percent express dissatisfaction with the government's performance. Additionally, 75 percent of Lebanese citizens have no trust in their religious leaders, with 65 percent believing that corruption among religious leaders is as common as it is among secular ones.

== Hezbollah contribution to instability ==
Hezbollah is a highly influential and heavily armed non-state actor in Lebanon, functioning both as a political party and a military force. It exercises significant control over large parts of the country, especially in the southern and eastern regions, and often provides essential services in these areas, effectively replacing the national government. This gives Hezbollah the characteristics of a parallel state, with considerable autonomy and influence. The Lebanese government and military were unable to challenge its power, raising concerns about Hezbollah's potential to independently escalate tensions with Israel.

The organization has exploited Lebanon's political corruption for illicit activities, such as using its influence within the Ministry of Agriculture to facilitate the importation of ammonium nitrate, which was later involved in the 2020 Beirut explosion. Over time, Hezbollah has become Lebanon's dominant political force, operating with minimal accountability. Although the group has the capacity to seize formal control of the Lebanese state, it has preferred to leverage the country's weaknesses, exercising power without assuming the formal responsibilities of governance.

Hezbollah's control extends to key border regions, notably with Syria, and includes the use of the Port of Beirut for the smuggling of drugs, weapons, and explosives, all while avoiding governmental oversight and interference. According to Bilal Ramez, Hezbollah has a history of imposing its will on various political sects and suppressing opposition movements that conflict with its interests.

=== Foreign affairs ===
Hezbollah has long emphasized its ties to Iran, a relationship that many Lebanese view as indicative of the group's foreign allegiances, utilized to advance the latter's regional ambitions. The group's actions have sparked concerns that its domestic political activities may be subordinated to its own regional objectives.

In 2006, Hezbollah's provocative actions against Israel led to widespread criticism, and it remains a point of contention, with opponents holding the group responsible for the conflict's escalation. Wikileaks revealed that Nabih Berri, longtime speaker of parliament who openly supported Hezbollah, told US ambassador Jefferey Feltman "to allow Israel to keep pummeling the group". Additionally, concerns mounted over the weapons that Hezbollah amassed. While the group assured the public that its arsenal would be used for the defense of Lebanon only, it was suspected that Hezbollah's weapons would be used against Lebanese opponents, potentially sparking another civil war. These fears were realized, and Hezbollah's use of force within Lebanon became evident, in May 2008, when the group responded with force to a government investigation and the dismissal of a Hezbollah-aligned airport security chief by blocking roads and seizing control of parts of Beirut. The resulting violence left 81 people dead.

In 2011, the number of Lebanese Shi'ite casualties in the Syrian civil war surfaced, and this served as undeniable evidence of the involvement of Hezbollah in the war, this was inconsistent with the impression they attempted to convey. The group's leadership, particularly Hassan Nasrallah, faced criticism for its contradictory stance on regional uprisings. While Nasrallah praised the Arab Spring revolutions as just, he simultaneously expressed support for Syrian President Bashar al-Assad, whom he commended for his leadership and reforms. Despite its political dominance among Lebanon's Shiite community, Hezbollah faces significant internal opposition, particularly among those who resent Iran's influence in Lebanon and fear a broader regional conflict, especially related to Syria or a potential war with Israel. In 2011, an exposed conversation from Wikileaks revealed that Lebanese politician Walid Jumblatt, while publicly advocating for a ceasefire with Israel, privately hoped that Israel would continue military operations against Hezbollah until the group's military capabilities were destroyed.

Hezbollah's active involvement in the Syrian Civil War has also prompted vocal criticism from various quarters. Former Hezbollah Secretary-General Subhi Tufayli, who commands a significant following in the Beqaa Valley, has accused the group of serving Iranian interests and criticized its support for the Assad regime in Syria. Other religious critics, including Hani Fahs (d. 2014), Ali al-Amin, Ahmad al-Asad, and Ibrahim Shams al-Din, have condemned Hezbollah's close ties to Iran and its alignment with the Assad regime. Shams al-Din, in particular, was noted for his advocacy of inter-sectarian tolerance and his rejection of Iran's dominance in Lebanon, while Ayatollah Muhammad Hussein Fadlallah, a revered figure within Lebanon's Shiite community, opposed Iran's model of governance (wilayat al-faqih) and promoted a more modern, almost scientific, approach to piety. Fadlallah's views, popular among younger, educated Shiites, represented a challenge to Hezbollah's ideological hegemony.

=== Corruption ===
Hezbollah has sought to maintain an image of incorruptibility, yet in 2009, Salah Izz al-Din, a figure with close ties to the group, was implicated in a fraudulent pyramid scheme that defrauded Shiite investors out of approximately one billion dollars. The scandal, which involved affluent emigrants from southern Lebanon, was a major embarrassment for Hezbollah and sparked widespread anger and public debate about corruption within the organization.

Hezbollah also faced public backlash in June 2013 following accusations that its fighters looted property during clashes with supporters of Sheikh Ahmad al-Assir. Despite the group's efforts to portray its forces as disciplined and incorruptible, these incidents further eroded its public image. In response, religious leaders from Tripoli called for jihad against Hezbollah, further destabilizing Lebanon and undermining public order.

In areas like the Beqaa Valley, Hezbollah's control is contested by fiercely autonomous local tribes, as demonstrated by a 2013 incident in which a tribe kidnapped more than 40 individuals in retaliation for the capture of one of its members by Syrian forces.

Hezbollah has long asserted its dominance in Lebanon by positioning itself as the nation's protector. However, its failure in defense from Israeli incursions and management of leadership transitions within the organization has revealed a truth that many had suspected: the group's authority rested on false moral claims and inflated self-image.

Under the leadership of Hassan Nasrallah, Hezbollah evolved from a militant group into a significant political force that exerted considerable influence over Lebanon's fractured sectarian system. The organization suppressed its adversaries, obstructed efforts at political reform, and upheld a corrupt system that served the interests of Hezbollah and those allied with it. Despite these actions, Hezbollah, with support from Iran, claimed to be the sole entity capable of defending Lebanon against Israeli military threats.

Since the last major conflict between Israel and Hezbollah 2006, Hezbollah has expanded its military capabilities with Iran's backing, developing a missile arsenal capable of striking deep within Israeli territory. Meanwhile, Lebanon's political elite, composed of former warlords and sectarian leaders, has largely remained unresponsive.

Hezbollah, once seen as an unchallenged force, now appears to be facing internal instability. The group's failure to fulfill its role as Lebanon's protector against Israeli aggression raises questions about the validity of its long-standing assertions.

=== International ostracisation ===
In July 2013, after years of resisting the US classification of Hezbollah as a terrorist organization, the European Union reached a compromise, designating only Hezbollah's military wing as such. In response, Muhammad Ra'ad, leader of Hezbollah's parliamentary delegation, rejected this distinction, declaring "The Hezbollah military wing is a lie invented by the Europeans because they feel the need to communicate with us and they want to make a delusional separation between the so-called military and political wings."

Following the EU decision, there was a notable decline in Hezbollah's prestige, particularly in the Gulf states, but also among other Arab nations. In response to Hezbollah's military actions in al-Qusayr, six members of the Gulf Cooperation Council, including the UAE, Qatar, and Saudi Arabia, imposed a political and economic boycott on the group.

In December 2015, the US Congress passed the "Hizballah International Financing Prevention Act," which imposed sanctions on any entity worldwide that conducted transactions on behalf of Hezbollah. In response, many Lebanese banks closed even accounts remotely linked to the group, creating tension between Hezbollah and Lebanon's banking sector. In June 2016, Hezbollah was allegedly involved in bombing the Blom Bank headquarters in Beirut, reportedly as retaliation for the bank's strict adherence to the US sanctions.

Hezbollah's image as a defender of the Palestinian cause and a member of the "axis of resistance" has made it increasingly unpopular in many Arab countries outside of its base of support in Lebanon. By November 2020, favorable views of Hezbollah were in the single digits in Egypt, Jordan, Kuwait, Qatar, Saudi Arabia, and the UAE. In all these countries, except Jordan, at least two-thirds of the population held a "very negative" opinion of the group. Even in Lebanon, Hezbollah's approval rating had steadily declined from 50% in 2017 to 34% by 2020.

=== Internal criticism ===
According to political and security analyst Georges Haddad, many in the Shi'ite community feel abandoned by Hezbollah regarding leadership of the community and preparation of the next phase of Lebanon's development. According to Lebanon expert Firas Maksad, Lebanese political leaders, including some who belong the Shi'ite faction, are relishing Hezbollah's deterioration.

Respect for Hezbollah gained during its attacks against Israel in 2006 was replaced by animosity and suspicion due to a rise in sectarianism intensified by the Arab Spring of 2010, and as a late consequence of the Iranian invasion of Iraq in 2003, which exacerbated tensions between Sunnis and Shi'ites, particularly in Lebanon where Hezbollah is seen as an instrument for the expansion of Iran's hegemony.

Despite its influence, Hezbollah has limited popular support in Lebanon. According to a survey by the Arab Barometer, only 30 percent of Lebanese citizens express significant trust in the group, while 55 percent say they distrust it completely. Trust levels vary significantly across different sects: 85 percent of Shiites express high levels of trust in Hezbollah, while only 9 percent of Sunni Muslims and Druze, and 6 percent of Christians, share the same sentiment.

Support for Hezbollah's involvement in regional politics is also poor. Only one-third of respondents agree that Hezbollah's role in geopolitical matters of the region is beneficial to the Arab world, while 42 percent strongly disagree. Among Shiites, 78 percent view Hezbollah's regional actions positively, but this number drops significantly among other sects, with only 16 percent of Druze, 13 percent of Sunni Muslims, and 12 percent of Christians expressing the same view.

Nationally, only 12 percent of Lebanon's citizens say they feel most closely aligned with Hezbollah as a political entity. Among Shiites, who are the primary base of support for the group, 39 percent express this sentiment, with a similar percentage (37 percent) reporting that they feel detached from all political parties.

=== 2020 port explosion ===
On 4 August 2020, an explosion at the port of Beirut killed at least 218 people, injured more than 7,000, and left around 300,000 people homeless, as well as costing an estimated $15bn in damages. The blast was caused by 2,750 tons of ammonium nitrate, used both for agriculture and the manufacture of explosives, that had been stored unsafely in a warehouse. Many attribute the explosion to government negligence and corruption, and among its results were the eruption of protests all over Lebanon and the resignation of the entire cabinet, with the government remaining in a caretaker capacity. Domestic investigations into the explosion have been repeatedly delayed, obstructed and blocked by Hezbollah leaders, by threatening the presiding judge and orchestrating political manipulations. The two main foci of the investigation were Ali Hassan Khalil, a former finance minister and Ghazi Zaiter, a former public works minister, both belonging to the Amal movement, strongly allied with Hezbollah. Senior officials refused to show up for investigation, and four years after the explosion there were still no arrests made.

=== Assassination of critics ===
According to al-Arabiya, Hezbollah's rise to power in Lebanon is largely attributed to internal conflicts within the Shiite community, which the group exploited to consolidate its control. Drawing from the strategies of Hezbollah's affiliates in Iran, Iraq, and Yemen, the organization achieved hegemony through political violence, including political assassinations.

Key incidents in this pattern of violence include the 2004 attempt on Marwan Hamadeh's life, the assassination of former Prime Minister Rafic Hariri on February 14, 2005, and the killing of prominent journalist and opposition figure Samir Kassir on June 2, 2005. The same month saw the bombing that killed George Hawi, a former communist leader and critic of Syria's influence in Lebanon. Other attacks that year included the failed assassination attempt on journalist Ali Ramez Tohme, and the bombing that seriously wounded Lebanese news anchor May Chidiac, a vocal critic of Syria. Later in 2005, Gebran Tueni, a leading figure in the March 14 movement and a fierce opponent of Syria, was killed in a car bomb attack.

From 2006 onwards, the frequency of assassinations and assassination attempts rarely subsided. In 2006, Lebanese cabinet minister Pierre Gemayel was gunned down, and in 2007, anti-Syrian lawmakers Walid Eido and Antoine Ghanem were also murdered. In 2008, terrorism investigator Wissam Eid was killed in a car bombing, followed by the 2012 assassination of Wissam al-Hassan, head of the Internal Security Forces' intelligence branch, who had led an investigation into Hezbollah's alleged involvement in the 2005 assassination of Rafic Hariri.

The string of high-profile killings continued into the 2010s, including the 2013 car bombing that killed Mohamad Chatah, an advisor to Saad Hariri, a strong critic of both Hezbollah and Syrian President Bashar al-Assad. The 2021 murder of activist Lokman Slim, known for his opposition to Hezbollah, marked the continuation of this trend of targeted violence.

=== Assassination of Shi'ite political opponents ===
Hezbollah is suspected of involvement in the assassination of individuals within the Shiite community itself. In the late 1980s, popular communist figures like Hussein Mroue and Hassan Hamdan (Mahdi Amel), and other rival leaders within the Shiite political movement, such as Daoud Daoud, Mahmoud Faqih, and Hassan Sbayti from the Amal Movement, were assassinated during the "War of Brothers" between Hezbollah and Amal. The leader of Amal, Nabih Berri, criticized Hezbollah's violent tactics at the time, calling the group "Dracula" for its reliance on bloodshed.

These events have cast doubt on Hezbollah's image as a protector of the Shiite community, particularly given its role in perpetuating sectarian violence and its involvement in the Syrian Civil War, where it supported the Assad regime. Hezbollah's growing power has rendered the Lebanese military unable to confront the organization, which has become a dominant force within the country.

=== Decline ===
In October 2019, widespread protests broke out across Lebanon, triggered by pervasive corruption and a severe economic decline. Demonstrators from all religious sects voiced their frustration with the political system, blaming Hezbollah and its allies as the core of what they referred to as "the regime." The protests called for the establishment of a new political structure that would move beyond the sectarian divisions that had long defined Lebanese politics and is promoted by Hezbollah and its allies. This rare cross-sectarian unity led to the resignation of the Lebanese Cabinet and the beginning of efforts to reorganize the government.

However, these efforts were largely stalled by the outbreak of the COVID-19 pandemic, which halted the momentum for change. At the same time, similar protests occurred in neighboring countries, where Shiite populations in Iran and Iraq also expressed dissatisfaction with organizations linked to Hezbollah and the Iranian Revolutionary Guard Corps (IRGC), as well as other militant organizations in the region with Iranian backing.

==== Economic blow ====
Hezbollah's three main monetary resources, the unlicensed quasi-banking institution Al-Qard al-Hasan (AQAH), Lebanon's insolvent banking system and cash bearing planes from Iran, have greatly diminished. On 30 September 2024 MTV Lebanon reported that "cash storage centers, including a large part of the AQAH vaults" had been destroyed in Israeli airstrikes and that the organisation was left in "financial crisis". According to local political science professor Hilal Khashan, Hezbollah is "unable to pay rank and file members who have fled their homes and need to feed their families". In addition, another one of Hezbollah's main sources of income, cash smuggled in on regular flights from Tehran to Beirut, has also largely withered. According to Khashan, due to Israeli threats of targeting flights into Beirut, Iran is scared to send cash to Hezbollah, furthermore, the Lebanese government has tightened its control over the airport, and the shipments of cash which had evaded Lebanese customs, have ceased. The Voice of America quoted David Asher, a former U.S. Defense and State Department official, as saying that Hezbollah has lost access to the Lebanese banking system, and based on reports from Lebanese bankers and Hezbollah financiers, the wealthiest of Lebanon's bankers have left to Europe and the gulf and will not allow Hezbollah to draw large amounts of money from their establishments.

==== 2024 electronic device attack ====
On 17 and 18 September 2024, thousands of handheld pagers and hundreds of walkie-talkies intended for use by Hezbollah exploded simultaneously in two separate events across Lebanon and Syria in an Israeli attack. The attack killed at least 42 people, and injured at least 4,000, according to the Lebanese government. The Atlanta Council reports that it was meant to be an incapacitating strike, crippling Hezbollah by injuring hundreds of members all at once, and then executing a similar attack on the next day. According to Erem news, the strikes targeted the third and fourth ranks of Hezbollah commanders, and together with the assassinations of the second rank and the secretary general, caused the organization to become decentralised. The incident was described as Hezbollah's biggest security breach since the beginning of the Israel–Hezbollah conflict in October 2023. The attack was perceived as an "utter humiliation" for Hezbollah, and the fact that its security was breached twice without obstacle, was a realization of the fact that the organisation was incapable of protecting its own people.

==== Killing of Hezbollah leadership ====
On 8 January 2024, Wissam Hassan al-Tawil was killed by an Israeli airstrike against a vehicle in the village of Majdel Selm in Lebanon. According to a security official, his killing was a "painful blow" to Hezbollah. At the time of his death, he was the highest ranking Hezbollah official killed during the Israel–Hezbollah conflict (2023–present). According to some Arab media outlets, he was reportedly the brother-in-law of Hassan Nasrallah, the secretary-general of Hezbollah.

On June 12, 2024, Senior Hezbollah field commander Taleb Abdallah was killed in an Israeli airstrike, which reportedly hit a Hezbollah command and control centre in the southern region of Lebanon. Security sources in Lebanon said he was a member of Hezbollah's Military Council and its commander for the central region of the southern border strip. He held a rank equal to that of another senior commander in Hezbollah, Mohammed Nasser, who was killed three weeks later.

On July 3, 2024, senior Hezbollah field commander Mohammed Nasser was killed alongside Mohammed Khashab, another Hezbollah member, in an Israeli drone strike on his car in al-Hosh, Southern Lebanon. Nasser was the "Aziz" unit commander in Hezbollah, which oversaw operations in the Western Galilee. According to Kassem Kassir, an analyst with close ties to Hezbollah, "His assassination marks one of the largest losses [alongside Taleb Abdullah who was assassinated in June] for Hezbollah". and at the time of his death was considered the "most important Hezbollah official to have been killed" since the commencement of the Israel–Hezbollah conflict (2023–present).

On July 30, 2024, Hezbollah top commander Fuad Shukr ("Al-Hajj Mohsin") was killed in an Israeli strike on the suburbs south of Beirut. Shukr was a close associate of Imad Mughniyeh, was one of the founders of Hezbollah in 1982 and one of its leading figures. He also served as military advisor to Hassan Nasrallah, and according to Reuters, he was responsible for the evolution of Hezbollah attacks from suicide bombings to elaborate offensive operations developing Hezbollah's arsenal through the acquisition of advanced weaponry, including guided missiles, cruise missiles, anti-ship missiles, long range missiles and drones. According to Reuters, "His killing was the heaviest blow to Hezbollah's command since the 2008 assassination of Imad Mughniyeh".

On 20 September 2024, Ibrahim Aqil and Ahmed Mahmud Wahbi commanders of the elite Hezbollah Radwan Force were killed in an Israeli strike in Beirut, along with 16 other senior commanders from the unit. He was wanted by the United States for being involved in the 1983 bombing of the US embassy in Beirut, he was acclaimed by Hezbollah as being "one of its great leaders".

On 24 September 2024, Ibrahim Qubaisi, head of Hezbollah's Missile Corps, was killed in an Israeli an attack on a Hezbollah stronghold in southern Beirut. Qubaisi held a number of important military positions within Hezbollah, planned and executed numerous attacks, targeting Israeli civilians and soldiers, and had close ties with senior military leaders in Hezbollah.

On 26 September 2024, Mohammed Srur (Abu Saleh), Hezbollah drone commander, was killed in an Israeli airstrike in Beirut.

On 28 September 2024, Nabil Kaouk, both general and deputy head of the Hezbollah executive council, was killed in an Israeli airstrike in Beirut.

==== Killing of Hassan Nasrallah and his successor ====
On 28 September 2024, Hassan Nasrallah was killed along with Ali Karaki and an additional 20 Hezbollah commanders. Nasrallah was the secretary-general of Hezbollah and was described as being "the centrifuge around which the movement spun". Even Before Nasrallah's death many analysts believed that the movement's reputation was fading, but after he was killed The Telegraph quoting Lina Khatib stated that Hezbollah suffered irreversible damage that the movement would never recover from, and that the movement would "quite possibly be facing a slow but terminal decline". The Telegraph further said that the organisation with "a chokehold on Lebanese politics appears to be crumbling in real time". The Economist stated that the Lebanese public perceived the group as "humiliated" and had come to resent their domination of Lebanese politics. The killing of Nasrallah has evoked a mixture of apprehension, hidden joy and relief in the Arab capitals of the region, according to professor Mehran Kamrava as quoted by Reuters.

Five days later, on 3 October 2024, an Israeli Air Force strike killed Hashem Safieddine at a location in Dahieh, a Beirut suburb that is a Hezbollah stronghold. The airstrike targeted an underground bunker at which Hezbollah intelligence chief Hussein Hazimah ("Mortada") was also located. On 22 October, the IDF formally announced his killing along with Hussein Hazimeh and 24 other senior Hezbollah members. Hezbollah confirmed Sadieddine's death the following day, and confirmed Hazimeh's death two days later. According to analyst Mohanad Hag Ali, the organization "has been significantly downgraded in terms of reputation, military capability, leadership", and its "ability to spring back and stand on their feet has been significantly diminished." The decapitation of Hezbollah and the elimination of all viable candidates, left only Naim Qassem as the successor of Nasrallah, though he lacks the religious and political credentials, as well as the necessary ties to Iran, and is denied access from databases related to military groups by the Iranian Revolutionary Guard, who, according to prof. Khaled Al-Azzi of the Lebanese University, is currently running the organisation.

== Proposed solutions and analysis ==
According to NBC News, despite the crisis in Lebanon, a number of politicians see potential for the resurrection of Lebanon as a new kind of country "with effective institutions, a single, powerful army and a dynamic democracy unfettered by sectarianism". Former Lebanese prime minister Fouad Seniora called Lebanon a "failed state" which was "hijacked by Hezbollah" who is backed by Iran, and he expressed the necessity of reacquiring a functioning government.

It has been suggested by Lebanese-American professor David Ramadan that the decline of Hezbollah is an opportunity for the Lebanese to take back control over their country and "build a future based on peace, not perpetual war", and "to break free from the stranglehold of a militia that has brought only destruction". The most prominent of direct repercussions, as noted by expert on Lebanese affairs Bilal Remez, are filling the presidential vacuum by electing a candidate accepted by all, and stripping Hezbollah of its weapons, thereby converting it into an exclusively political party and weakening its grip on the joints of the state of Lebanon. These actions would allow the Lebanese army to return to its role and powers, considering that the president is the military Commander in Chief and is essential to establishing a stable, empowered Lebanese government which is equipped to handle the crises at hand. According to Ramez, Lebanon has the opportunity to rid itself of the Iranian Hegemony which "has led the country into deep crises".

During the years 2023-2024 the administrations of the US and France promoted the election of a new president to potentially break the political impasse, and recruited the support of some Arab nations, including Qatar and Saudi Arabia, though almost all attempts were blocked by Hezbollah. This initiative was proposed with hopes of mitigating the frustration the Lebanese people have "with years of ineffective government" that have granted power to the deep-seated political elites including Hezbollah. According to State Department spokesman Matt Miller the goal of this initiative is to "break the stranglehold that Hezbollah has had on the country and remove Hezbollah veto over a president". After the election of a president, the suggested plan proposes to reach a diplomatic solution to the Hezbollah-Israel conflict, based on UN resolution 1701 which was adopted in 2006 but never implemented, and to elect a new Lebanese prime minister. Egypt and Qatar expressed concern over external interference in Lebanese politics. However, a 2022 Arab Barometer survey found that a significant portion of the Lebanese population, 62 percent, supported international involvement, particularly the agreement between the Lebanese government and the International Monetary Fund aimed at stabilizing the economy, despite the prospect of unpopular reforms.

Spanish member of parliament Hermann Tertsch is quoted as saying that Lebanon should seize the opportunity to "acquire real sovereignty, hold elections, have its army dominate the entire country, and not be the terrorist base it has been until now".

=== Lebanese military ===
In contrast to other entities in Lebanon, the Lebanese Armed Forces (LAF) stand out as an institution with significant public trust. Approximately 85 percent of respondents to a survey led by the Arab Barometer express confidence in the LAF, a far higher level of trust compared to Hezbollah or any other political or religious group. This high level of trust may be attributed to the LAF's inclusive composition, representing all Lebanese factions, and its role as the country's largest employer, offering essential benefits to military personnel and their families.

The Lebanese military, which receives some aid from the United States, is generally considered weaker than Hezbollah, though in light of Hezbollah's decline, politicians, analysts and experts, such as Najib Mikati, Fares Halabi and others, have called for the strengthening of the Lebanese Armed Forces and their deployment to secure Lebanon's southern region. Many Lebanese citizens advocate for protection of the peace in the region through cooperation between the Lebanese Armed Forces and UN peacekeepers, as had been described in UN resolution 1701 which prohibited the operation of Hezbollah militants south of the Litani river. Recent diplomatic efforts have encouraged Lebanon's caretaker government to implement this resolution, despite the challenges and limitations that have been highlighted by ongoing skirmishes.

=== Discourse on relations with bordering countries ===
==== Syria ====
The 2024 overthrow of the Bashar al-Assad regime is viewed as having a significant positive impact on Lebanon. The ongoing Syrian civil war had resulted in millions of people fleeing the country, with Lebanon serving as one of the primary destinations for displaced individuals, hosting approximately two million refugees. According to Lebanese Prime Minister Najib Mikati, this influx placed enormous strain on Lebanon's resources, exacerbating existing economic challenges and intensifying competition for jobs and services. In December 2024, following the collapse of the Assad government, Mikati called for the return of Syrian refugees to their homeland, stating that this would be "the best resolution" for the issue.

During a visit to Beirut, Greek Prime Minister Kyriakos Mitsotakis expressed concerns about the potential security and migration risks stemming from the overthrow of the Assad regime, but also voiced optimism that it could lead to the return of millions of Syrian refugees, including those in Lebanon, to their homeland. Mitsotakis' visit marked the first by a foreign leader to Lebanon after the ceasefire and significant developments in Syria, underscoring his commitment to the country.

In December 2024 a meeting took place between the newly appointed Syrian leader Ahmed al-Sharaa and a delegation of Lebanese Druze lawmakers and religious figures, led by Walid and Taymur Jumblatt. According to France 24 and Business Recorder, al-Sharaa assured that Syria "would not negatively interfere in Lebanon and would respect its neighbour's sovereignty", and that Syria "will stay at equal distance from all", referring to the factions in Lebanon.

==== Israel ====
L'Orient Today quoted a December 2024 interview on the Lebanese channel al-Jadeed, in which Wiam Wahhab, former Lebanese minister usually aligned with the Iranian axis and head of the Arab Unification Party, called for "normalization with Israel" and adopting a realistic perspective of the situation in Lebanon. Wahhab stated that "The Lebanese have sacrificed more than 75 years of their lives for the Palestinian cause. This must come to an end," and "the nation does not want war and no longer wishes to fight the Israeli state", further saying that "we must abandon these illusions. We want to live comfortably". According to The Telegraph, similar appeals were made by Israeli prime minister Benjamin Netanyahu in October 2024 when he called upon the Lebanese people to "take back" their country and to "return it to a path of peace and prosperity."

== 2025 government establishment ==
In early February 2025, Lebanon established its first full-fledged government in over two years, following a prolonged period of political deadlock and economic turmoil. The breakthrough came with the election of President Joseph Aoun on January 9, 2025, who initiated consultations to form a new administration. On February 8, 2025, Nawaf Salam, a former judge at the International Court of Justice, was appointed as Prime Minister, leading a 24-member cabinet. This government formation was notably expedited, concluding just over three weeks of negotiations—a significant departure from previous protracted processes.

The newly formed government has outlined a comprehensive agenda focusing on financial reforms, economic reconstruction, and the implementation of United Nations resolutions to stabilize Lebanon's borders. Prime Minister Salam emphasized the urgency of addressing the nation's public debt and financial default, which have severely impacted the economy since the crisis began in 2019. Additionally, the government aims to restructure the banking sector to restore financial stability and confidence. On the international front, the administration seeks to engage in dialogue with neighboring countries, particularly Syria, to resolve longstanding issues such as border demarcation and the repatriation of displaced individuals. The formation of this government has been met with cautious optimism, as it represents a critical step toward political stability and economic recovery in Lebanon.
