= Economy of Lebanon =

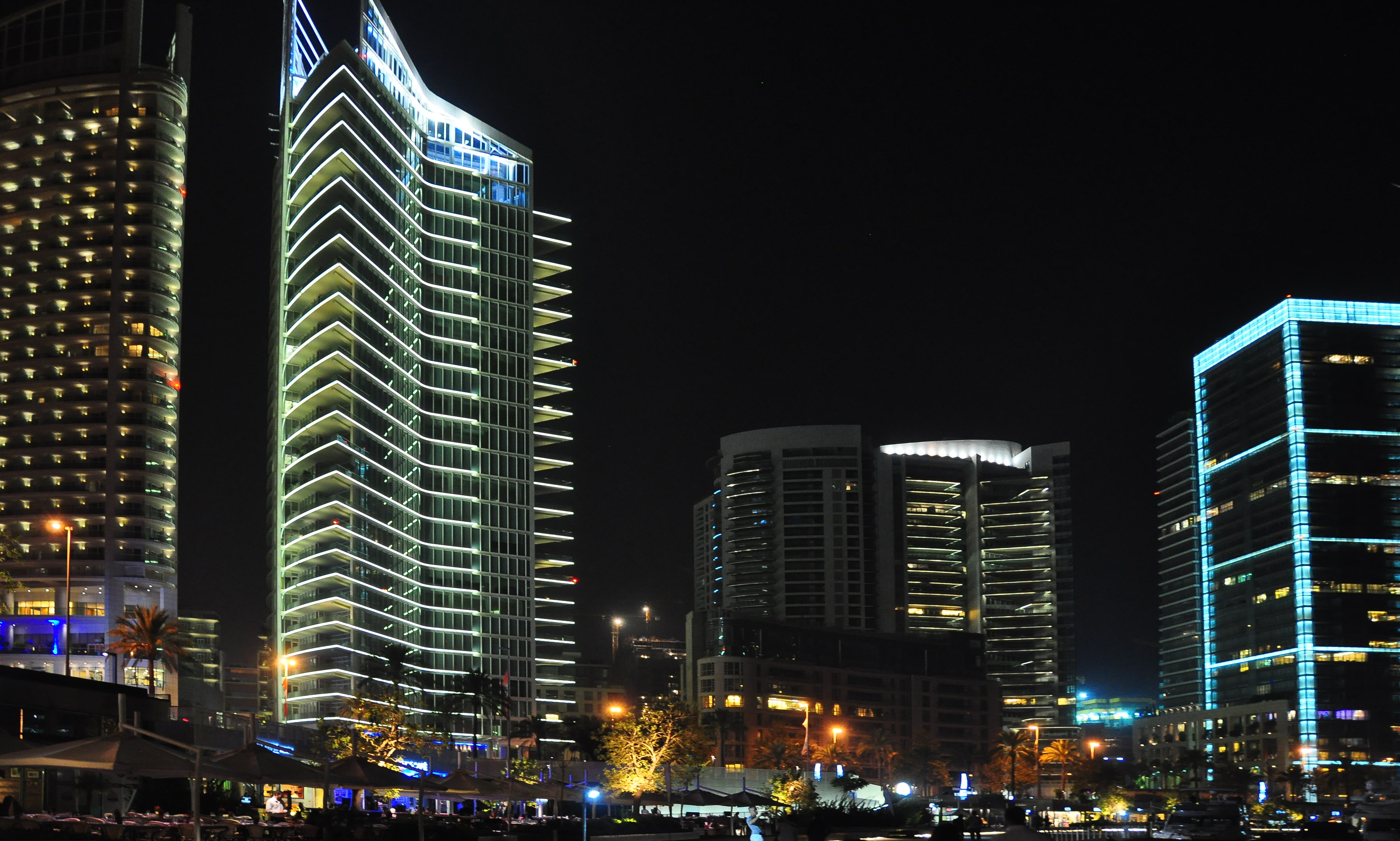
- Beirut Central District
- Currency: Lebanese pound (LBP)
- Fiscal year: Calendar year
- Trade organisations: CAEU
- Country group: Developing/Emerging; Lower-middle income country

Statistics
- Population: ▲5,364,482 (2025 est.)
- GDP: ▲$34.497 billion (nominal; (2025); ▲$69.94 billion (PPP; 2025)
- GDP growth: ▼ -7.5% (2024); ▲4.0% (2025)
- GDP per capita: ▲$5,900 (nominal, 2025); ▲$11,960 (PPP, 2025)
- GDP by sector: agriculture: 3.9%; industry: 13.1%; services: 83%; (2017 est.)
- Inflation (CPI): ▼14.6% (2025 est.)
- Population below national poverty line: 27.4% (2012); 63% on less than $5.50/day (2011)
- Gini coefficient: 31.8 (2011)
- Human Development Index: ▼0.752 (2023) (102nd); N/A IHDI (2023)
- Labour force: ▲2,399,073 (2019); in addition, there are as many as 1 million foreign workers; 39.5% employment rate (2007)
- Labour force by occupation: agriculture: 11.94%; industry: 22.3%; services: 65.76% (2019)
- Unemployment: 6.2% (2019)
- Youth unemployment: ▼22.7% (2023)
- Main industries: banking, tourism, real estate and construction, food processing, wine, jewelry, cement, textiles, mineral and chemical products, wood and furniture products, oil refining, metal fabricating

External
- Exports: ▼$4.29 billion (2024)
- Export goods: jewelry, base metals, chemicals, consumer goods, fruit and vegetables, tobacco, construction minerals, electric power machinery and switchgear, textile fibers, paper
- Main export partners: GCC 29.96%; UAE 24.1%; Kuwait 2.67%; Qatar 2.38%; EU 15.04%; France 2.55%; Spain 2.01%; Egypt 7.66%; United States 6.21%; Turkey 4.85%; Iraq 4.77%; Switzerland 3.33% (2024)
- Imports: ▼$18.7 billion (2024)
- Import goods: petroleum products, cars, medicinal products, clothing, meat and live animals, consumer goods, paper, textile fabrics, tobacco, electrical machinery and equipment, chemicals
- Main import partners: EU 30.55%; Greece 8.17%; Italy 4.81%; Germany 3.36%; China 10.7%; GCC 10.43%; UAE 5.11%; Saudi Arabia 4.96%; Switzerland 7.45%; Turkey 6.44%; Egypt 5.72%; United States 3.31% (2024)
- FDI stock: ▲$61.02 billion (2016); ▲ Abroad: $13.46 billion (2016)
- Current account: ▼ −$12.37 billion (2017 est.)
- Gross external debt: ▲$33.1 billion (December 2018)

Public finance
- Government debt: US$74.5 billion (Sep 2018), 140% of GDP (2018)
- Foreign reserves: ▼$55.42 billion (31 December 2017 est.)
- Budget balance: −6.9% (of GDP) (2017 est.)
- Revenue: 11.62 billion (2017 est.)
- Spending: 15.38 billion (2017 est.)
- Economic aid: recipient $5.4 billion (2014 est.)
- Credit rating: Standard & Poor's: B-; Outlook: Negative; Moody's: C; Outlook: Not assigned; Fitch: CCC; Outlook: N/A
- All values, unless otherwise stated, are in US dollars.

The economy of Lebanon has been experiencing a large-scale multi-dimensional crisis since 2019, including a banking collapse, the Lebanese liquidity crisis and a sovereign default. It is classified as a developing, lower-middle income mixed economy. The nominal GDP was estimated at $34.49 billion in 2025, with a per capita GDP amounting to $5,900.

The Lebanese economy went through a significant expansion after the 34-day war of 2006, with growth averaging 9.1% between 2007 and 2010. After 2011 the local economy was affected by the Syrian civil war, growing by a yearly average of 1.7% on the 2011–2016 period and by 1.5% in 2017. In 2018, the size of the GDP was estimated to be $54.1 billion. Between 2019 and 2021, the economy shrank by 53.4%, the highest contraction in a list of 193 countries. Since 2020, the International Monetary Fund no longer publishes data on the Lebanese economy.

Lebanon is the third-highest indebted country in the world in terms of debt-to-GDP ratio. As a consequence, interest payments consumed 48% of domestic government revenues in 2016, thus limiting the government's ability to make needed investments in infrastructure and other public goods.

The Lebanese economy is service-oriented. Lebanon has a strong tradition of laissez-faire, with the country's constitution stating that "the economic system is free and ensures private initiative and the right to private property". The major economic sectors include metal products, banking, agriculture, chemicals, and transport equipment. The main growth sectors include banking and tourism. There are no restrictions on foreign exchange or capital movement.

== History ==
GDP per capita in international dollars, 1980–2012
Year	Lebanon	MENA avg
1972	5,322	3,346
1981	5,897	3,581
1982	3,970	3,681
1983	5,064	3,781
1984	7,592	3,903
1985	9,613	3,980
1986	9,025	3,873
1987	10,722	3,869
1988	7,875	3,826
1989	4,674	4,001
1990	4,158	4,191
1991	5,649	4,472
1992	5,925	4,570
1993	6,352	4,658
1994	6,868	4,764
1995	7,320	4,860
1996	7,606	5,138
1997	7,892	5,352
1998	8,031	5,512
1999	7,928	5,585
2000	8,077	5,876
2001	8,478	6,063
2002	8,792	6,261
2003	9,144	6,711
2004	9,959	7,175
2005	10,367	7,360
2006	10,751	7,882
2007	11,893	8,354
2008	13,116	8,735
2009	14,197	10,862
2010	15,168	10,920
2011	15,523	11,896
2012	15,985	13,088

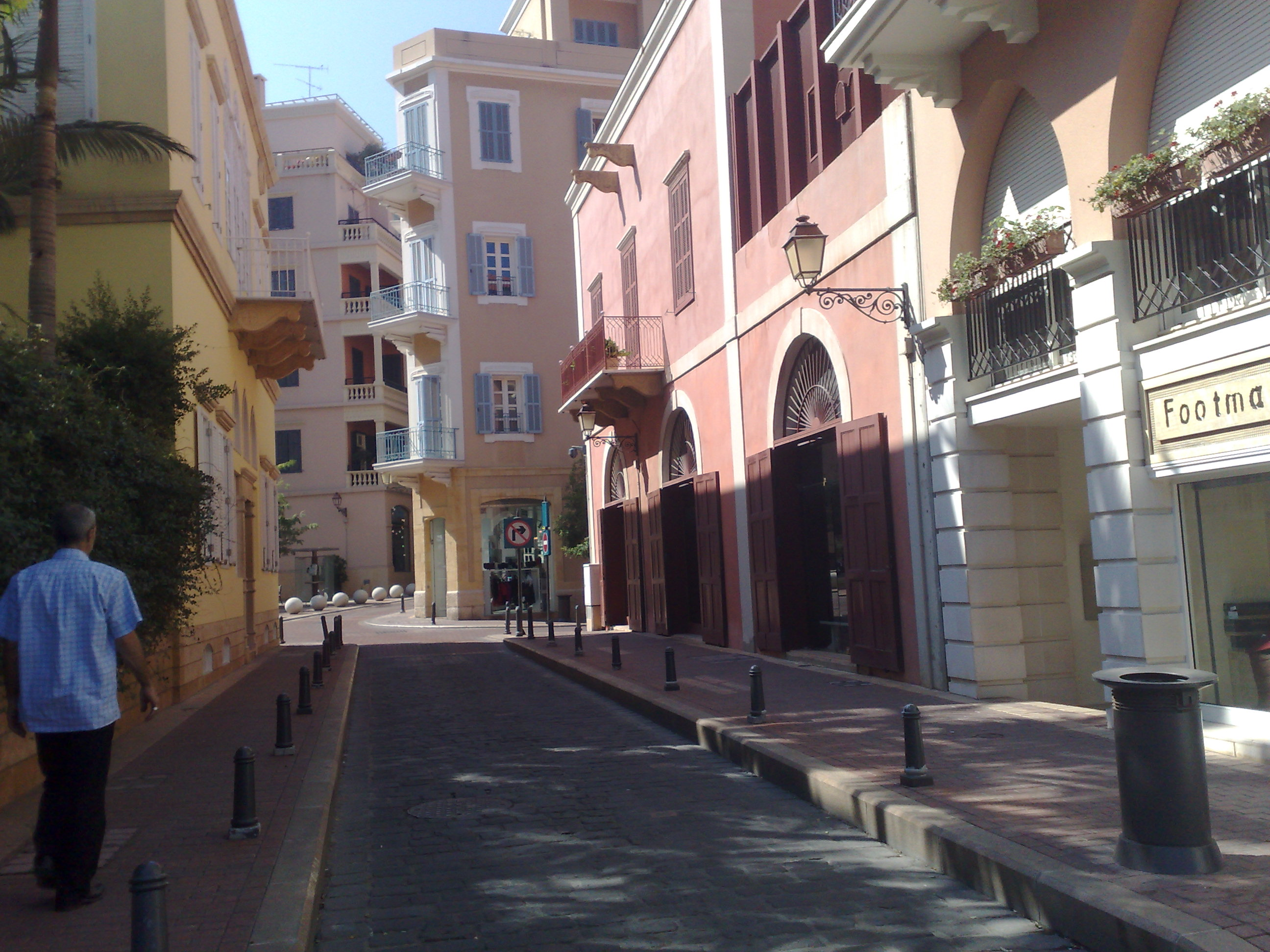
A pedestrian-only street in Beirut's central district.

Following independence from France, Lebanon established itself as a free-trade economy. The service sector, specifically banking, finance and tourism, dominated the economy. Beirut thrived as the "Paris of the Middle East" and served as the financial and business center of the Arab world.

The 1975–1990 Lebanese Civil War seriously damaged Lebanon's economic infrastructure, cut national output by half, and had major consequences for Lebanon's position as a Middle Eastern entrepot and banking hub. After the war, the central government regained its ability to control key port and government facilities. As a result, GDP per capita expanded 353% in the 1990s. Economic recovery has been helped by a financially sound banking system and resilient small- and medium-scale manufacturers, with family remittances, banking services, manufactured and farm exports, and international aid as the main sources of foreign exchange. Lebanon's economy has made impressive gains since the launch of "Horizon 2000," the government's $20 billion reconstruction program in 1993. Real GDP grew 8% in 1994 and 7% in 1995 before Israel's Operation Grapes of Wrath in April 1996 stunted economic activity. Real GDP grew at an average annual rate of less than 3% per year for 1997 and 1998 and only 1% in 1999. During 1992–98, annual inflation fell from more than 100% to 5%, and foreign exchange reserves jumped to more than $6 billion from $1.4 billion. Burgeoning capital inflows have generated foreign payments surpluses, and the Lebanese pound has remained relatively stable. Progress also has been made in rebuilding Lebanon's war-torn physical and financial infrastructure. Solidere, a $2-billion firm, is managing the reconstruction of Beirut's central business district; the stock market reopened in January 1996, and international banks and insurance companies are returning. The government nonetheless faces serious challenges in the economic arena. It has had to fund reconstruction by tapping foreign exchange reserves and boosting borrowing. Reducing the government budget deficit is a major goal of the current government. The gap between rich and poor grew in the 1990s, resulting in popular dissatisfaction over the skewed distribution of the reconstruction's benefits and leading the government to shift its focus from rebuilding infrastructure to improving living conditions.

After the end of the civil war, Lebanon enjoyed considerable stability, Beirut's reconstruction was almost complete, and increasing numbers of tourists poured into the nation's resorts. The economy witnessed growth, with bank assets reaching over US$75 billion, Market capitalization was also at an all-time high, estimated at $10.9 billion at the end of the second quarter of 2006. The month-long 2006 war severely damaged Lebanon's economy, especially the tourism sector. Over the course of 2008 Lebanon rebuilt its infrastructure mainly in the real estate and tourism sectors, resulting in a comparatively robust post war economy. Major contributors to the reconstruction of Lebanon include Saudi Arabia (with US$1.5 billion pledged), the European Union (with about $1 billion) and a few other Persian Gulf countries with contributions of up to $800 million.

Given the frequent security turmoil it has faced, the Lebanese banking system has adopted a conservative approach, with strict regulations imposed by the central bank to protect the economy from political instability. These regulations have generally left Lebanese banks unscathed by the 2008 financial crisis. Lebanese banks remain, under the current circumstances, high on liquidity and reputed for their security. In late 2008, Moody's shifted Lebanon's sovereign rankings from stable to positive, acknowledging its financial security. Moreover, with an increase of 51% in the Beirut stock market, the index provider MSCI ranked Lebanon the world's best performer in 2008. Lebanon is one of the only seven countries in the world in which the value of the stock market increased in 2008. The Lebanese economy experienced continued resilience, growing 8.5 percent in 2008, 7 percent in 2009 and 8.8% in 2010. However, Lebanon's debt to GDP ratio remained one of the highest in the world.

The Syrian crisis has significantly affected Lebanese economic and financial situation. The demographic pressure imposed by the Syrian refugees now living in Lebanon has led to competition in the labour market. As a direct consequence unemployment has doubled in three years, reaching 20% in 2014. A loss of 14% of wages regarding the salary of less-skilled workers has also been registered. The financial constraints were also felt: the poverty rate increased with 170,000 Lebanese falling under the poverty threshold. In the period between 2012 and 2014, the public spending increased by $1 billion and losses amounted to $7.5 billion. Expenditures related only to the Syrian refugees were estimated by the Central Bank of Lebanon as $4.5 billion every year.

The International Monetary Fund issued a second report on Lebanon in October 2015, where its expectations of the economic growth rate were lowered to 2%, compared to the 2.5% growth rate of the first report, released in April 2015.

In October 2019, Lebanon witnessed nationwide protests that erupted over the country's deteriorating economic conditions. Thousands of demonstrations took to the streets of downtown Beirut, calling for the government of Prime Minister Saad al-Hariri to quit over "its utter failure to stop the deterioration of the economic and living conditions in the country". The protests began after the government announced to charge 20 cents per day for Voice over Internet Protocol (VoIP) over social media apps, including WhatsApp, Facebook, and other applications.

Lebanon has a very high level of public debt and large external financing needs. The 2010 public debt exceeded 150.7% of GDP, ranking fourth highest in the world as a percentage of GDP, though down from 154.8% in 2009. At the end 2008, finance minister Mohamad Chatah stated that the debt was going to reach $47 billion in that year and would increase to $49 billion if privatization of two telecoms companies did not occur. The Daily Star wrote that exorbitant debt levels have "slowed down the economy and reduced the government's spending on essential development projects".

During the early part of 2020, the central bank (BdL) defaulted on $90 sovereign debt obligations and the government needed recourse to the IMF for a shortfall of $50 billion.

On 4 August 2020, the explosion of 2,750 tons ammonium nitrate in a Beirut port warehouse caused the destruction of the "only large grain silo" in the country, in addition to more than 200 people killed and several square kilometres of pulverised buildings in the downtown core of the city. By 9 August, President of France Emmanuel Macron had counted over €250 million of global contributions to the relief effort. On 10 August, the government of Hassan Diab resigned. The day before, IMF director Kristalina Georgieva had laid down four conditions for the co-operation of her organization:

- restoring the financial solvency of the state,
- cutting losses at state-owned companies,
- passing a law to regulate capital outflows and
- setting up a social safety net.

On 14 August, the United Nations Office for the Coordination of Humanitarian Affairs (UNOCHA) launched a $565 million appeal for donors of aid to victims of the explosions. The UN effort was to focus on: meals, first aid, shelters, and repair of schools. Some of the money that Macron collected would be used by the UNOCHA.

=== Reforms ===
Lebanon's current program of reforms focuses on three main pillars:

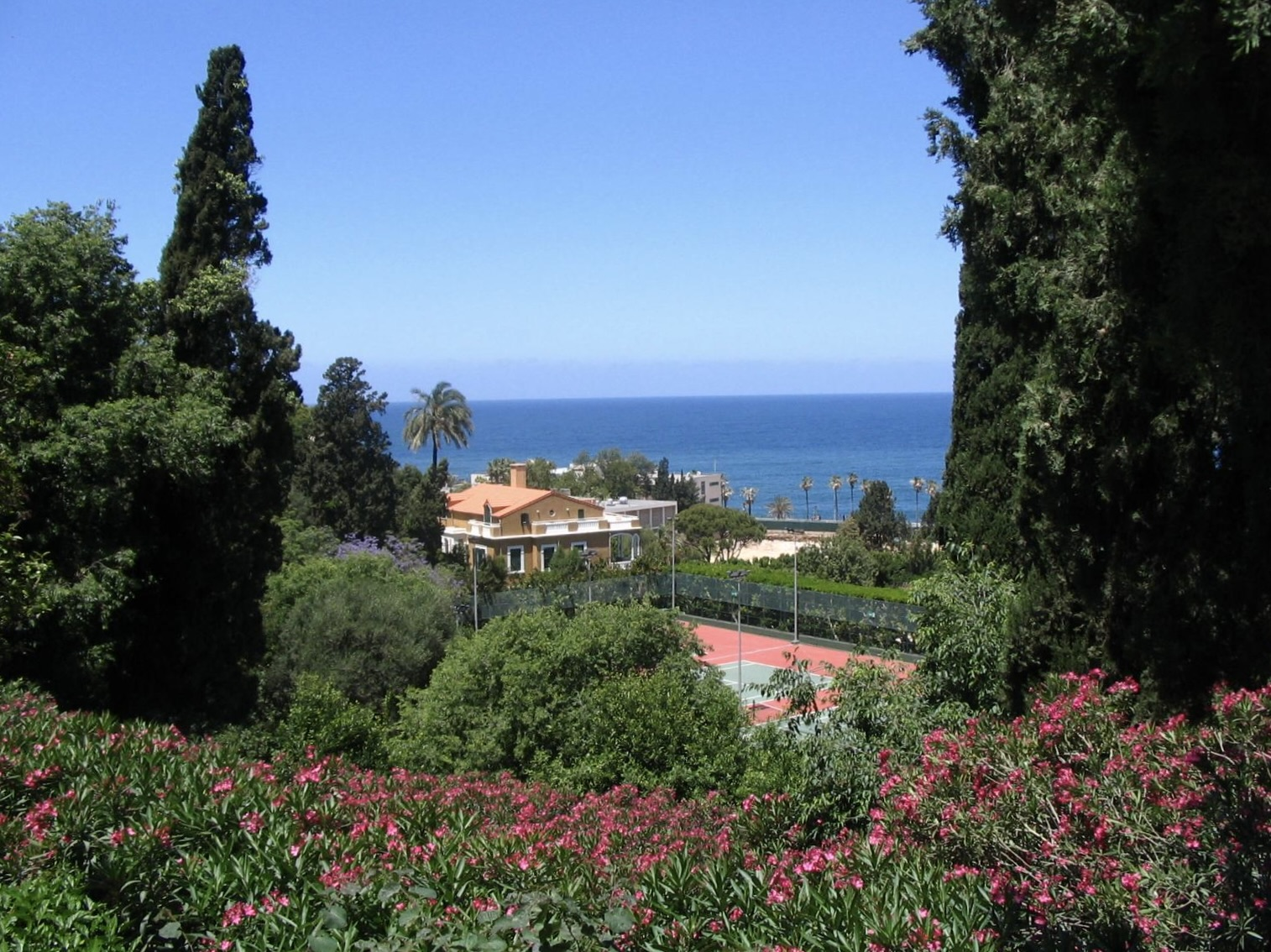
Lebanon has always been under constant political and social challenges because of its location between the east and the west.

- Economic revival and sustainable growth, with the private sector as the engine of growth;
- Fiscal consolidation and structural improvement in public sector finances; and
- Monetary, financial, and price stability.

The government also has maintained a firm commitment to the Lebanese pound, which has been pegged to the dollar since September 1999. In late 2000, the government substantially reduced customs duties, adopted export promotion schemes for agriculture, decreased social security fees and restrictions on investment in real estate by foreigners, and adopted an open-skies policy, with positive effects on trade in 1991. Nonetheless, the relative appreciation of the Lebanese currency has undermined competitiveness, with merchandise exports falling from 23% of GDP in 1989 to 4% in 2000.

In 2001, the government turned its focus to fiscal measures, increasing gasoline taxes, reducing expenditures, and approving a value-added-tax that became effective in February 2002. Slow money growth and dollarization of deposits have hampered the ability of commercial banks to finance the government, leaving more of the burden to the central bank. This monetization of the fiscal deficit has put enormous pressure on central bank reserves, mitigated only slightly with the issuance of new Eurobonds over the past 2 years. The central bank has maintained a stable currency by intervening directly in the market, as well as low inflation, and succeeded in maintaining investors' confidence in debt. It has done so at a cost, however, as international reserves declined by $2.4 billion in 2000 and by $1.6 billion in the first half of 2001.

For 2002, the government has put primary emphasis on privatization, initially in the telecom sector and electricity, with continued planning for sales of the state airline, Beirut port, and water utilities. The government has pledged to apply the proceeds of sales to reducing the public debt and the budget deficit. In addition, it projects that privatization will bring new savings as government payrolls are pared, interest rates decline, and private sector growth and foreign investment are stimulated. The government also is tackling the daunting task of administrative reform, aiming to bring in qualified technocrats to address ambitious economic programs, and reviewing further savings that can be realized through reforms of the income tax system. The Lebanese Government faces major challenges in order to meet the requirements of a fiscal adjustment program focusing on tax reforms and modernization, expenditure rationalization, privatization, and improved debt management.

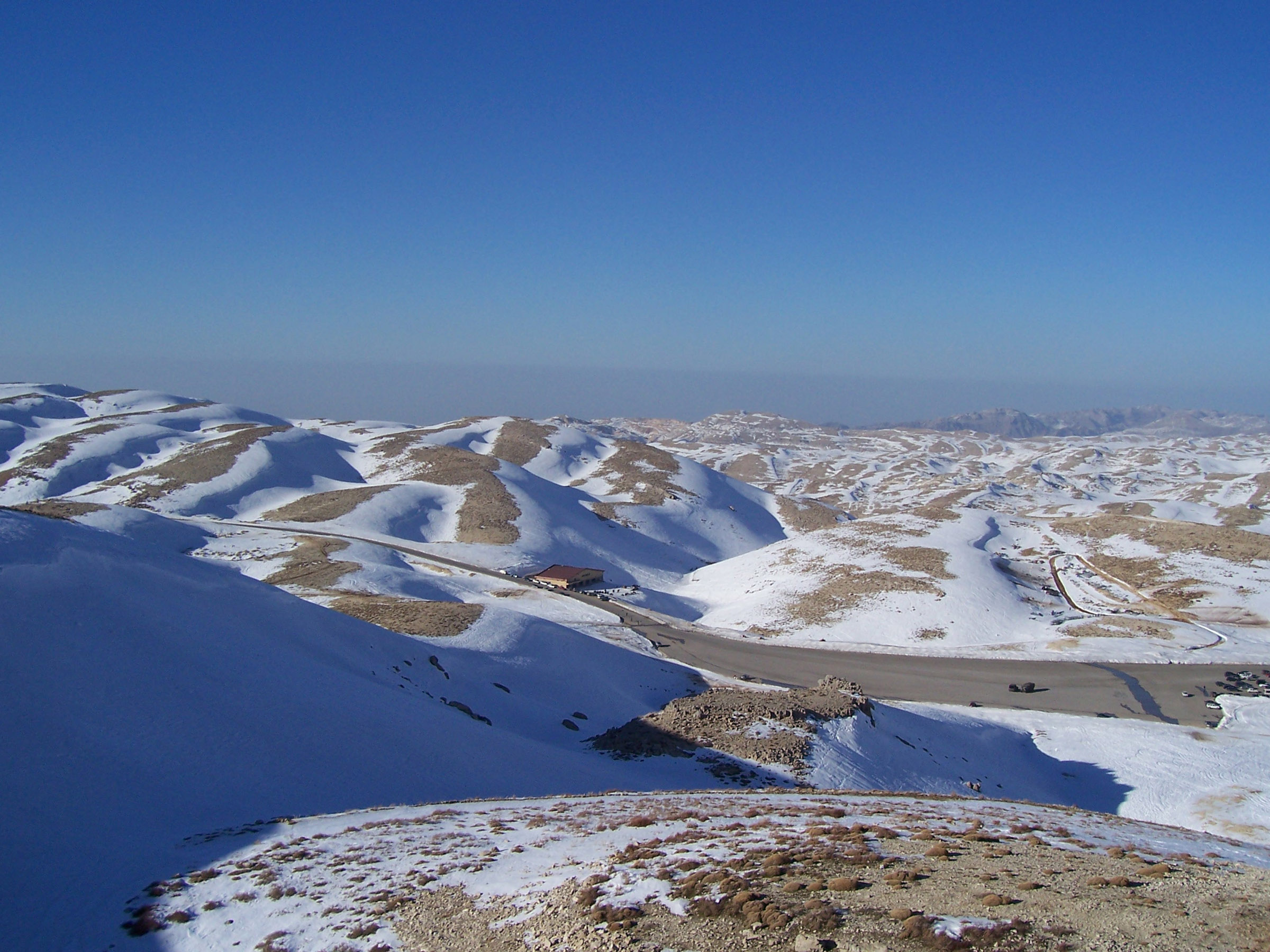
Faraya in Mount Lebanon Governorate. The Lebanese economy depends on its tourism sector throughout all seasons of the year. Tourists from Europe, GCC, and Arab countries visit Lebanon for various reasons.

The U.S. enjoys a strong exporter position with Lebanon, generally ranking as Lebanon's fourth-largest source of imported goods. More than 160 offices representing U.S. businesses currently operate in Lebanon. Since the lifting of the passport restriction in 1997 (see below), a number of large U.S. companies have opened branches or regional offices, including Microsoft, American Airlines, Coca-Cola, FedEx, UPS, General Electric, Parsons Brinckerhoff, Cisco Systems, Eli Lilly, Computer Associates and Pepsi Cola. Mexico has also many enterprises run by ethnic Lebanese, such as Carlos Slim's Telmex.

Solidere shares are the most actively traded in the Beirut Stock Exchange. Its share price in the Beirut Stock Exchange has risen sharply in the last year from around US$5.00 in early 2004 to close at US$17.50 on Friday, 23 December 2005.

In 2025, Lebanon amended its banking secrecy laws under pressure from the IMF. The reforms would allow independent auditors access to banking records from the past 10 years in an effort to stop corruption and facilitate a larger restructuring of the Lebanese banking industry.

=== 2019–present economic crisis ===
According to a World Bank report, Lebanon's economy which was structurally strained before the Syrian shock suffered a real blow as an aftermath of the Syrian crisis which brought around 1.5 million Syrian refugees into Lebanon. The GDP growth rate declined by around 1 percent in 2018. In August 2019, the USD parallel exchange rate started diverging from the official exchange rate; the official exchange rate for the USD had been £L1,507.5 since 1997, while the parallel exchange rate was £L1,600 in the fall of 2019 and would increase to around £L4,200 in May 2020. The USD parallel exchange rate is increasing because of the dollar shortage in Lebanon. In a bid to lower the dollar price, the central bank made an agreement with the licensed exchangers to make the official rates on offer at £L3,860/3,910. However, despite the central bank's efforts, on 23 June 2020, the black market dollar reached a staggering rate of £L 6,075 devaluing the Lebanese pound by 75%. This dollar shortage also caused 785 restaurants and cafes to close between September 2019 and February 2020 and caused 25,000 employees to lose their jobs. This economic crisis made Lebanon's gross domestic product fall to about $44 billion, which was about $55 billion the year before. The crisis became worse when the COVID-19 pandemic affected the Lebanese economy. In 2020, the country defaulted for the first time on $30 billion in bonds and tried to seek help from the IMF but the negotiations never reached fruition.

The liquidity crisis also lead to a restriction on the withdrawals from US dollar bank accounts. Depositors needed to preserve the value of their savings, especially following press reports about possible haircuts and restructuring of the banking sector. They therefore turned to buying real estate. For example, revenues from land sales of the major real estate developer, Solidere company, soared from nearly $1.3 million to $234.5 million. Also, these depositors turned to buying shares in Solidere company, which lead to a rise of 500% in its price between the start of the liquidity crisis and April 2021.

The already battered economy of Lebanon suffered fresh blow with the port blast on 4 August 2020. Economists have claimed that the blasts could result in the contraction of Beirut's GDP by around 20–25% for the year. The current figure surpasses IMF's last forecast of 12% crash in GDP because of the ongoing and increasing economic and political crisis in Lebanon.

In March 2021, Lebanon approved an emergency assistance package from the World Bank worth $246 million in order to support struggling families and strengthen the social safety and try to face the economic crisis.

On March 16, as the Lebanese pound jumped on the black market from £L13,000 to £L15,000 against the US dollar, protesters took to the streets, grocery stores closed and bakeries threatened to close.

After the meeting of the President Aoun and Prime Minister-designate Saad Hariri on March 18, the Lebanese pound dropped from £L15,000 against the dollar on the black market to £L12,500.

As of 2023, Lebanon is considered by some to have become a failed state, suffering from chronic poverty, economic mismanagement and a banking collapse. Lebanon’s poverty rate have surged from 20 percent to over 80 percent after 2019, driven by economic crises worsened by the 2020 Beirut explosion and the COVID-19 pandemic. These crises have intensified resource shortages and deepened reliance on sectarian patronage systems that have further entrenched societal divisions and accompanying political and economic stagnation.

==== Causes ====
===== External debt =====
After the civil war, the Lebanese government resorted to massive borrowing to finance its post-war restructuring. The yearly growth of gross debt between 1993 and 1995 was 123 percent and between 1995 and 2000 was 171 percent. Between 2005 and 2018, the yearly growth of debt has averaged around 22 percent, and in comparison the GDP growth rate for the same period has been in single digits with an exception of 2009. This high debt has caused Lebanon to spend a big chunk of its revenues in debt servicing; on average, close to 45 percent is spent by the government as interest payments. In 1996, interest payments made up almost 68 percent of that year's budget deficit. With debt piling up and growth being minuscule, Lebanon's debt to GDP ratio reached 178 percent by the end of 2019, which makes it the third most indebted country after Greece and Japan. In 2020, Beirut defaulted on a $1.2 billion external bond, the first sovereign default in its history. The nation is currently in discussions with a group of creditors about a possible restructuring of a defaulted Eurobond. A successful restructuring would allow the country to again access external credit markets.

===== Currency crisis =====
Lebanon's national currency, the Lebanese pound, is pegged to the US dollar at £L89,575 to US$1 as of September 2025. This fixed rate has been unstable due to the depreciating value of the pound in the black market. According to reports, the pound was trading at £L8,100 to US$1 in 2019 on the black market. The causes of the pound's depreciation can be traced back to the economy's dependence on imports. Lebanon in 2018 imported US$20 bn worth of goods and exported goods worth only US$3 bn. This trade deficit also widened as the remittances share, which was around 24 percent in 2008 declined to nearly 12 percent in 2018. This coupled with geopolitical tensions of the region, caused the Pound-Dollar peg rate to wither. As a response, the central bank resorted to more borrowing and also issued a directive that required all money transfer offices to cash out transfers in the local currency, further exacerbating the dollar crunch.

===== Corruption and political instability =====
After a devastating explosion in Beirut on 4 August 2020 that killed at least 200 people, the government, headed by Prime Minister Hassan Diab, announced that his government was stepping down. In his speech, Mr. Diab said that corruption cases were widespread in the country's political and administrative landscape; other calamities hiding in many minds and warehouses, and which pose a great threat, are protected by the class that controls the fate of the country.

According to reports, the financial troubles and political inaction had caused growing anger and frustration among people who began protesting in October last year. Protesters demanded an end to corruption and the resignation of political leaders including the then Prime Minister Saad al-Hariri. This year, the newly formed government under Diab faced the same accusations of corruption. In November 2019, The central bank of Lebanon was accused of running a Ponzi scheme as it relied on fresh borrowing to service its debt. The bank denied the allegations stating that its action was in par with the 1963 Code of Money and Credit. Amidst the failing banking system, banks resorted to putting informal curbs on dollar withdrawals and international transfers, stirring mass protests and police violence. The pandemic brought the protests to a halt for some time but the port explosion in Beirut once again brought people to the streets, who, as reports state, have lost faith in the political elite. Some estimates state that half of Lebanon's population is living near or below the poverty line and thousands of people have lost their jobs. There have been incessant power cuts and some residents have been calling the blackouts worse than those witnessed in the 1975–1990 civil war.

==== FATF analysis of Lebanon ====
In October 2024, the Financial Action Task Force (FATF) placed Lebanon on its "grey list," designating it as a jurisdiction under increased monitoring due to strategic deficiencies in countering money laundering and terrorist financing.

===== Background =====
Lebanon has faced a severe economic crisis since 2019, characterized by a collapsing financial system, sovereign default, and escalating public debt. The situation was exacerbated by the COVID-19 pandemic and the 2020 Beirut port explosion, leading to widespread poverty and infrastructure damage. In March 2025, the World Bank estimated that Lebanon's recovery and reconstruction needs amount to approximately $11 billion.

===== FATF Grey Listing =====
The FATF's decision to grey-list Lebanon was influenced by several factors:

- Ineffective Judiciary: Concerns over the independence and efficiency of Lebanon's judicial system in prosecuting financial crimes.
- Cash-Based Economy: Following the collapse of its banking sector in 2019, Lebanon's increased reliance on cash transactions raised alarms about illicit financial flows.
- Terrorist Financing Risks: The FATF highlighted that Lebanese authorities did not adequately address risks stemming from the activities of local paramilitary organizations.

===== Implications =====
Being on the grey list subjects Lebanon to enhanced monitoring and may deter foreign investment, complicate remittances, and increase compliance costs for its financial institutions. The designation underscores the urgent need for comprehensive reforms to strengthen Lebanon's anti-money laundering and counter-terrorist financing (AML/CFT) framework.

===== Government Response =====
In response to the grey listing, Lebanese authorities have committed to implementing a detailed two-year action plan, concluding at the end of 2026, to address the identified deficiencies and facilitate reassessment of Lebanon's status by the FATF. Anothet step towards FATF's demands was reported on July 14, 2025, as Lebanon’s central bank has told all licensed banks and financial companies that they are not allowed to do business, directly or indirectly, with Al-Qard Al-Hassan, a group linked to Hezbollah and supported by Iran. Although Al-Qard Al-Hassan says it is a charity that gives interest-free loans, the U.S. has accused it since 2007 of secretly helping Hezbollah move money around the world. This ban comes after growing international pressure and past Israeli attacks on the group’s offices, adding to concerns about Hezbollah’s influence on Lebanon’s financial system.

==== 2025 government establishment ====
The European Union has stipulated that Lebanon must implement significant financial reforms and secure an agreement with the International Monetary Fund (IMF) before it can receive the remaining €500 million of a previously pledged €1 billion aid package. This condition was emphasized by EU Commissioner for the Mediterranean, Dubravka Suica, during her recent visit to Lebanon, where she highlighted the necessity of restructuring Lebanon's banking sector. Despite a draft agreement with the IMF in 2022, Lebanon has yet to enact the required reforms to access the associated funding. The newly formed government, led by Finance Minister Yassine Jaber, has expressed a renewed commitment to economic reform and plans to engage with the IMF, with a delegation expected to visit in March to discuss the government's reform agenda.

==== 2025 IMF–World Bank Spring Meetings ====
In April 2025, a Lebanese delegation participated in the IMF–World Bank Spring Meetings in Washington, D.C., where it presented a unified reform vision aimed at addressing Lebanon’s protracted financial and economic crisis. The delegation, led by Finance Minister Yassine Jaber, included the Minister of Economy, the Governor of Banque du Liban, and senior presidential advisors. This marked a notable shift from previous years, with the International Monetary Fund (IMF) positively noting the coherence and clarity in Lebanon’s reform approach.

The delegation outlined a series of proposed reforms covering areas such as tax policy, social security, economic restructuring, and monetary governance. Banque du Liban Governor Karim A. Souaid emphasized the importance of preserving the central bank’s independence and safeguarding the rights of small depositors.

While IMF officials welcomed the renewed seriousness of the Lebanese side, they reiterated that progress would depend on effective implementation—something that had hindered past negotiations due to political divisions and legislative inaction. Further discussions were held with IMF Middle East and Central Asia Director Jihad Azour. In addition, Lebanon sought support through a proposed $1 billion World Bank loan to assist in post-conflict reconstruction and the establishment of a national social safety net. According to the delegation, the reform proposals were internally driven and framed as essential for the country's economic recovery and long-term stability, rather than merely a response to external pressures.

In January 2026, the World Bank approved $350 million for Lebanon, aimed at helping the country’s poor and vulnerable populations, strengthening social protection systems, and supporting digital transformation of public services as part of efforts to bolster Lebanon’s economic recovery. The package is split into two projects, $200 million for social safety net enhancement and $150 million for digital acceleration.

== Economic sectors ==
=== Agriculture ===
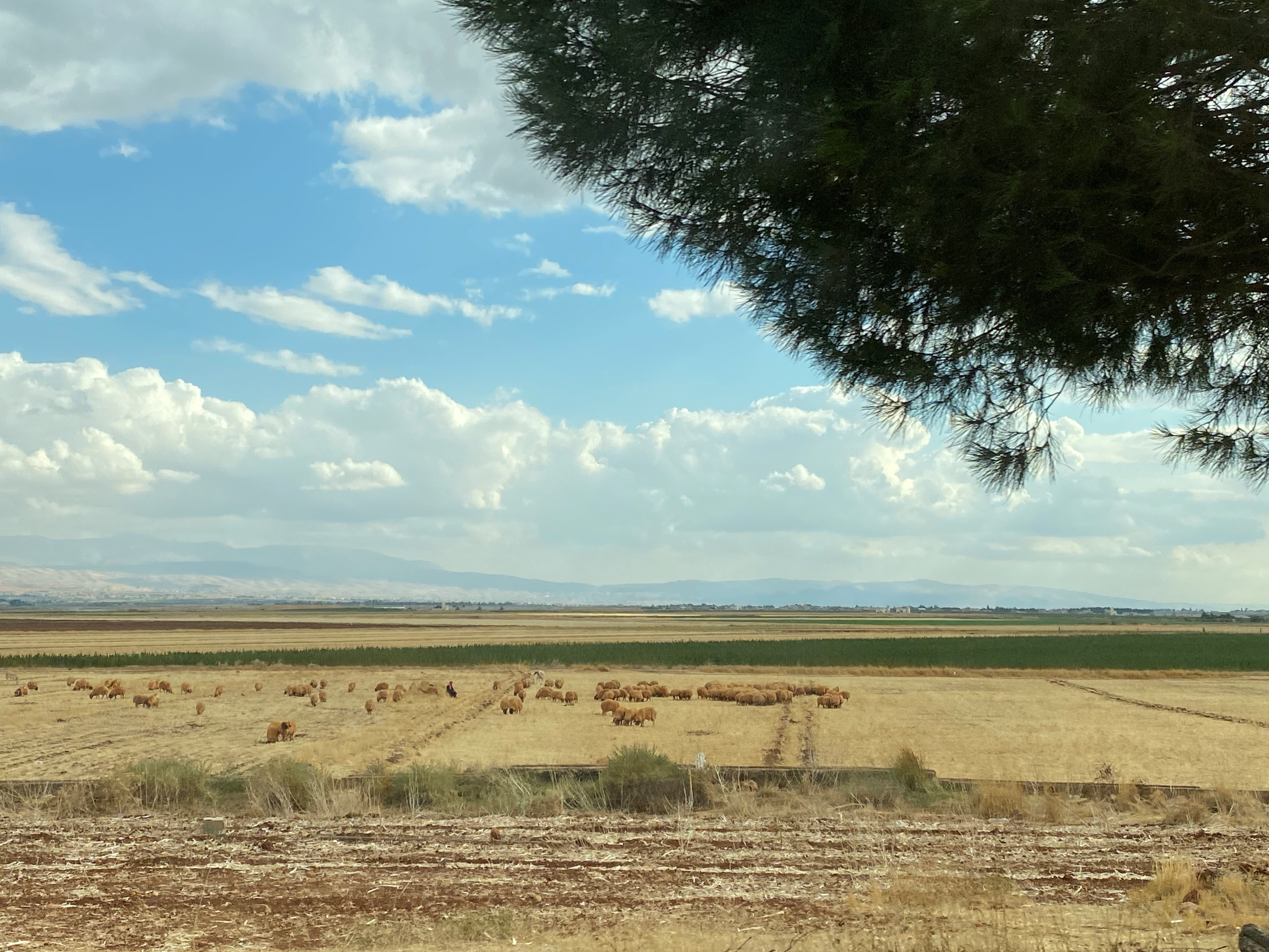
Sheep and fields in Bekaa Valley (2021)

Agriculture in Lebanon is the third most productive sector in the country after the tertiary and industrial sectors. It contributes 3.1% of GDP and 8 percent of the effective labor force. The sector includes an informal Syrian labor and is dependent on foreign labor for its productivity. However, tobacco crops mostly rely on household labor, largely performed by women and children.

Main crops include cereals (mainly wheat and barley), fruits and vegetables, olives, grapes, and tobacco, along with sheep and goat herding. Mineral resources are limited and are only exploited for domestic consumption. Lebanon, which has a variety of agricultural lands, from the interior plateau of the Beqaa Valley to the narrow valleys leading downward to the sea, enables farmers to grow both European and tropical crops. Tobacco and figs are grown in the south, citrus fruits and bananas along the coast, olives in the north and around the Shouf Mountains, and fruits and vegetables in the Beqaa Valley. More exotic crops include avocados, grown near Byblos, and hashish (a major crop in the Beqaa Valley). Although the country benefits from favorable farming conditions and diverse microclimates, it relies on food imports, which make up 80% of its consumption.

=== Industrial ===
Leading industries in Lebanon included the manufacturing of food products, wood products and textiles. Many of the country's industries were harmed by the civil war, with the effects on the textile industry being the most severe. Although some of the country's industrial complexes were unharmed, Beirut's industrial capabilities was effectively razed and an influx of smuggled Israeli goods (officially banned) severely harmed domestic Lebanese industries. The construction industry has fueled much of the postwar economy, although it frequently experienced downturns because of recurring damage to infrastructure in the early 21st century and regional instability in the 2010s.

=== Shipping ===
The shipping industry is a major contributor to the Lebanese economy, having Lebanon's capital city, Beirut, as its major operations center from where distribution takes place to the Middle East region. The industry, which provides international transportation, logistic and household services, cover the ocean division, air freight division, land freight division, custom brokerage division, packing, insurance and warehousing.

=== Services ===
==== Education ====
Education in Lebanon is regulated by the Ministry of Education and Higher Education (MEHE). In Lebanon, English and/or French with Arabic are taught from early years in schools. English or French are the required media of instruction for mathematics and sciences for all schools. Education is compulsory from age 3 to 14.

According to a 2013 World Economic Forum (WEF) report, Lebanon was ranked 17th in overall quality of education, and 5th in science and mathematics. The survey was carried out as part of the WEF's Global Competitiveness Report. According to Muhammad Faour, a nonresident senior associate at the Carnegie Middle East Center in Beirut, "this assessment is a significant departure from the results of student achievement tests in every international test Lebanon and Qatar have participated in."

According to the Organization for Economic Co-operation and Development (OECD) and compiled from an amalgamation of international assessments, including the OECD's Pisa tests, the TIMSS tests run by US-based academics as well as the TERCE tests in Latin America, Lebanon ranked 13th globally in mathematics and sciences. In the international student achievement tests in math and sciences (TIMSS) in 2007 and 2011 for grade 8, Lebanese students scored well below the international average of 500. In math, Lebanon scored 449 during both 2007 and 2011.

Lebanon's adult literacy rate was 97.9% in 2014 according to the UN Human Development Index, ranking it 65th globally.

==== Healthcare ====
Lebanon is a small middle-income country on the Eastern Mediterranean shore with a population of around 4 million Lebanese citizens, 1.2 million Syrian refugees, and half a million Palestinian refugees. It is at the third stage of its demographic transition characterized by a decline in both fertility and mortality rates. Moreover, Lebanon, like many countries in the Middle East is experiencing an epidemiological transition with an increasingly ageing population suffering from chronic and non-communicable diseases. Mortality related to non-communicable diseases is 404.4 deaths per 100,000 individuals, with an estimate of 45% due to cardiovascular diseases, making them the leading cause of death in Lebanon. Lebanon has health indices that are close to those of more developed countries, with a reported life expectancy at birth of 80.1 years (81.4 years for women and 78.8 years for men) and an under-five mortality rate of 9.5 per 1,000 live births in 2016. Since the end of the 15-year Lebanese Civil War in 1990, Lebanon's health indicators have significantly improved.

The Human Rights Measurement Initiative finds that Lebanon is fulfilling 85.1% of what it should be fulfilling for the right to health based on its level of income. When looking at the right to health with respect to children, Lebanon achieves 99.1% of what is expected based on its current income. In regards to the right to health amongst the adult population, the country achieves 98.9% of what is expected based on the nation's level of income. Overall, Lebanon falls between the "bad" and "fair" categories for the right to health because when evaluating the right to reproductive health, the nation is fulfilling only 57.2% of what the nation is expected to achieve based on the resources (income) it has available.

==== Tourism ====
Beirut Central District

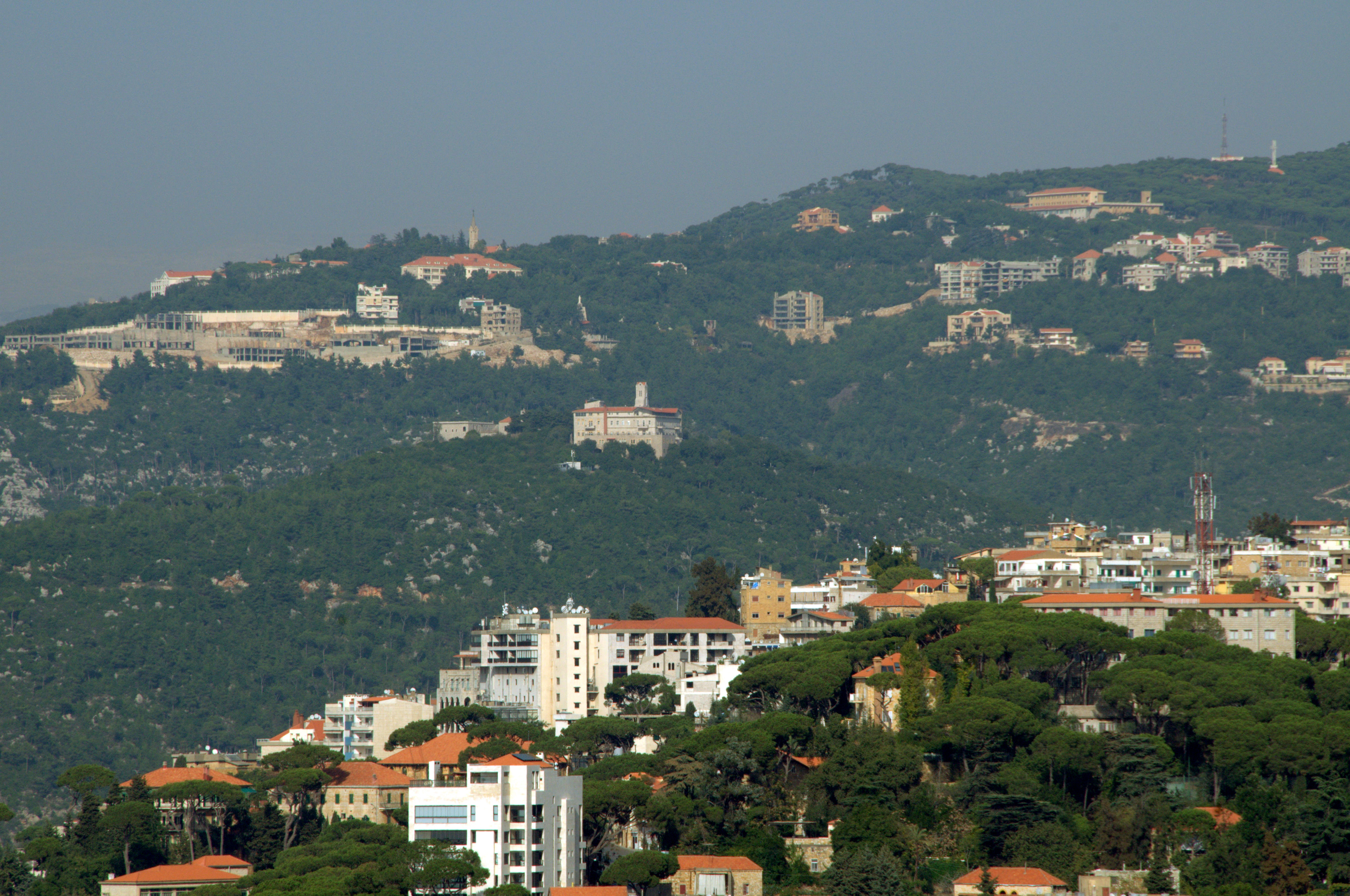
Mount Lebanon

The tourism industry in Lebanon has been important to the local economy historically and comprises a major source of revenue for the country.

From Stone Age settlements to Phoenician city-states, Roman temples to rock-cut hermitages, Crusader castles to Mamluk mosques and Ottoman hammams, the country's many historical landmarks and archaeological sites reflect thousands of years of world history. In addition, Lebanon has a history of cultural tourism. Outsider interest in Lebanese culture was especially stirred following the visits of European orientalists, scholars, and poets, particularly Alphonse de Lamartine, Ernest Renan, and Victor Guérin.

Prior to the Lebanese Civil War, Lebanon was regarded as "The Switzerland of the Middle East", and Beirut was referred to as "The Paris of the Middle East", and as a financial hub.

Casino du Liban reopened in 1996. The largest ski resort in the country was expanded and modernized. Lebanon's tourism industry also relies on Lebanese living abroad, who return regularly to the country during the summer season.

==== Telecommunications ====
Postal services and telecommunications have long played an essential role in Lebanon, a small country with an expansive diaspora, a vivid media landscape, and an economy geared toward trade and banking. The sector's history has nonetheless been chaotic, marked by conflict but also, and perhaps most importantly, a deeply rooted legacy of state control, weak competition, and intense politicization. A combination of poor services and high prices culminated in popular protests against the government's attempt, in October 2019, to tax the widely used messaging service WhatsApp. The anger this measure triggered captured a more general sense of dissatisfaction, and contributed to tipping the country into a protracted crisis. Civil unrest coincided with Lebanon's default on its ballooning debt; in the ensuing economic collapse, telecommunications have been among the infrastructure most affected.

== Infrastructure ==
=== Energy ===
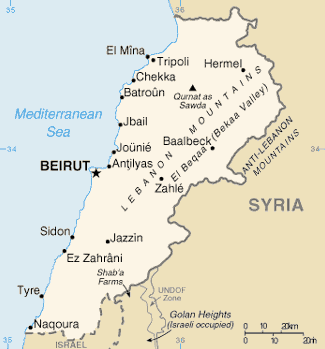
Map of Lebanon

Energy in Lebanon is dominated by oil, which represents more than 95% of the primary energy consumed in 2017. The great majority of energy used in the country is imported. The energy market in Lebanon is characterized by sharply rising consumption, and frequent shortages due to dilapidated infrastructure partly destroyed by the civil war that ravaged the country between 1975 and 1990.

Since the 1990s, however, major work has been undertaken by the public authorities to increase production, diversify the energy mix which is highly dependent on imported fossil fuels, and connect many households without access to electricity. The consumption of primary energy has thus increased by more than 4 times between 1990 and 2017, going from around 2 to more than 8 tonnes of oil equivalent over this period. But large gaps between generation capacity and electricity demand persist.

The primary energy use in 2009 in Lebanon was 77 TWh, 18 MWh per capita. In 2019, the total solar PV capacity was 78 MW, and it reached 1300 MW at the end of 2023.

=== Transport ===
Transportation in Lebanon varies greatly in quality from the ultramodern Beirut International Airport to poor road conditions in many parts of the country. The Lebanese civil war between 1975 and 1990 and the 2006 Lebanon War with Israel severely damaged the country's infrastructure.

=== Water supply and sanitation ===
Water supply and sanitation in Lebanon is characterized by a number of achievements and challenges. The achievements include the reconstruction of infrastructure after the 1975–90 Civil War and the 2006 war with Israel, as well as the reform of the water and sanitation sector through a water law passed in 2000. The law created four Regional Water Establishments to consolidate numerous smaller utilities.

The challenges include poor service quality, in particular intermittent water supply that persists despite the availability of relatively abundant water resources; the slow implementation of the water reform; the separation of responsibilities between various entities such as the Council for Development and Reconstruction, which are de facto in charge of investment, and the Regional Water Establishments, which are in charge of operation and maintenance; limited institutional capacity in the public sector, and in particular the Regional Water Establishments; politicization of decision-making; the absence of an autonomous regulatory agency; poor information about water resources, sector performance and assets; a very low share of metering and the absence of volumetric water tariffs; a high level of water distribution losses; limited cost recovery for water supply; and no cost recovery for sewerage and wastewater treatment. These challenges persist more than two decades after the end of the Civil War.

The Lebanese water and sanitation sector has received and continues to receive substantial foreign aid in the form of grants and soft loans from a dozen Western and Arab donors.

== Trade ==
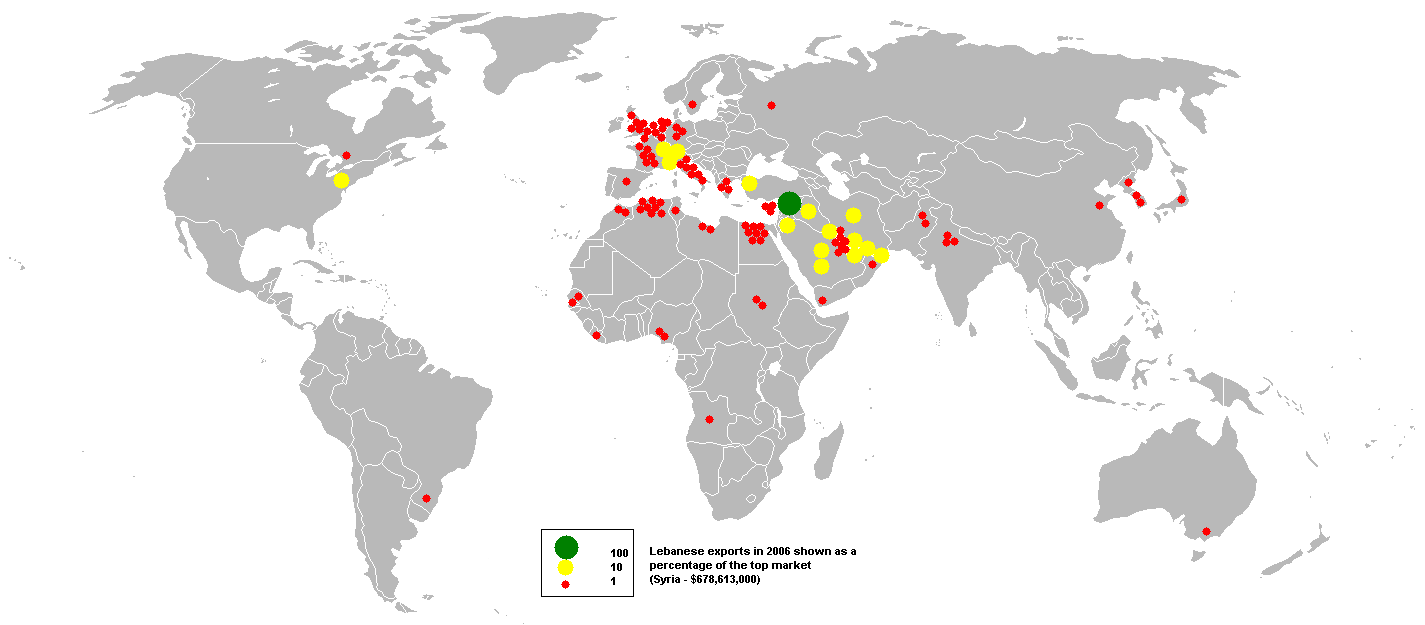
Lebanese exports in 2006

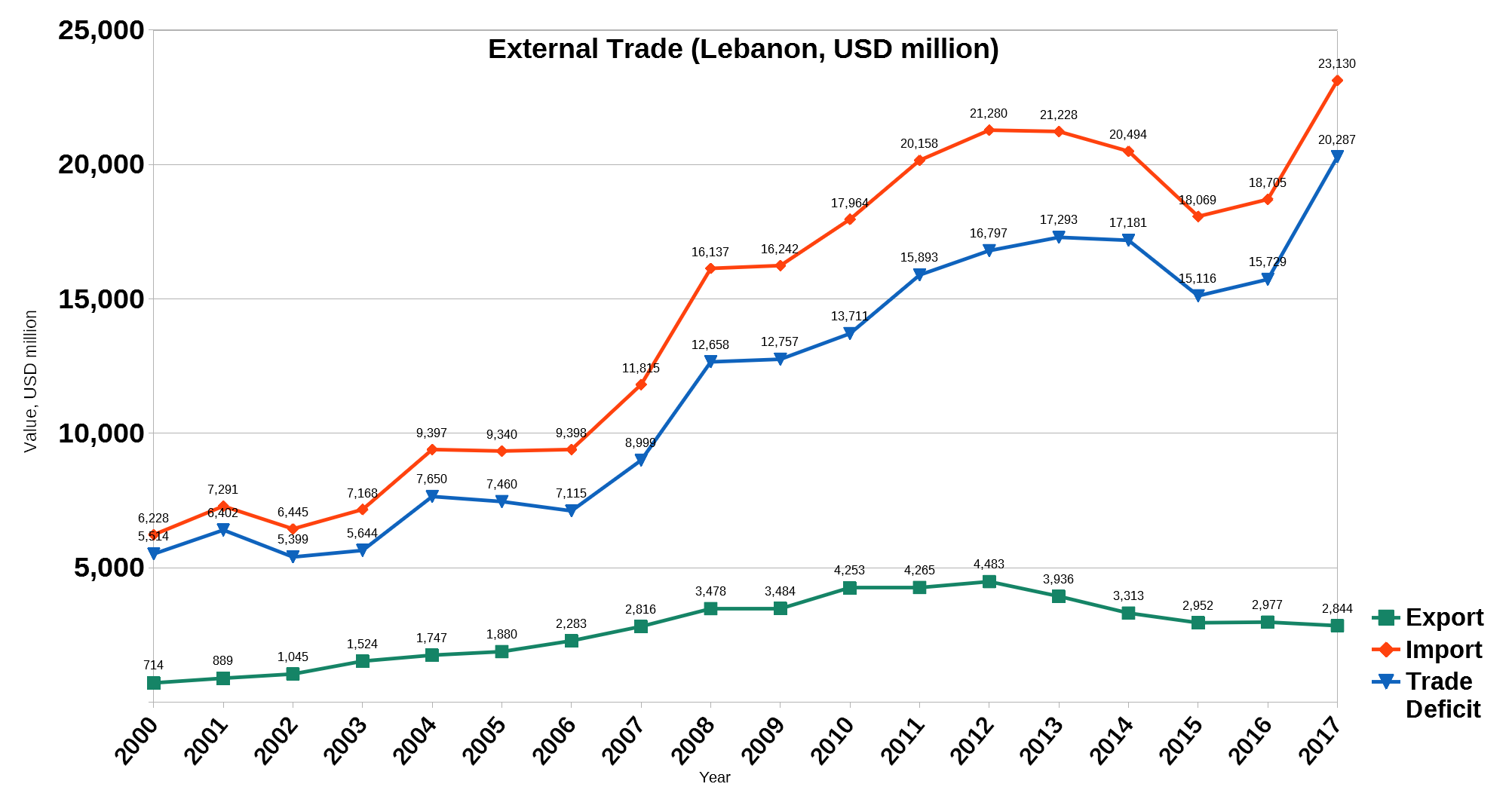
External trade (USD, million)

Lebanon's trade balance is structurally negative. In 2017, the trade deficit reached $20.3 billion. The country imported $23.1 billion worth of goods and services, and exported $2.8 billion.

Lebanon has a competitive and free market regime and a strong laissez-faire commercial tradition. The Lebanese economy is service-oriented; main growth sectors include banking and tourism. There are no restrictions on foreign exchange or capital movement.

=== Food security ===
Food accounted for 18% of the dollar value of the imports to Lebanon in 2018, according to World Bank statistics. Wheat and livestock are two foodstuffs for which Lebanon is import-dependent. Around 90 percent of imported wheat is sourced from Ukraine and Russia. The wheat reserves of Lebanon are kept in silos at the Port of Beirut and cover about three months of consumption. In 2019, domestic wheat production measured 130,000 tons, while wheat imports measured 570,000 tons.

The food security of Lebanon is a subject of debate. On the one hand, administrators of the UNESCWA used the World Food Programme in May 2016 to sell the story that the country imports up to 80% of its needs. On the other hand, domestic audiences are told that the country is almost self-sufficient in food:

Overall, Lebanon is self-sufficient in the production of fruits, and almost self-sufficient with regards to the production of vegetables. Self-sufficiency indexes reach up to 200% for bananas, citrus, and apples. However, Lebanon has a significant deficit in the production of cereals, livestock, and dairy products. Lebanon had a deficit in cereal production at an average of 800 thousand tons per year prior to the Syrian Crisis. Half of the quantity of imported cereals is soft wheat. Lebanon implements a wheat subsidies instrument, through the Ministry of Economy and Trade (MET)... The implementation of wheat subsidies is left to a yearly decision undertaken by the Council of Ministers... MET also implements a bread price control, with prices of bread fixed at 1 USD per 900 grams of standard Lebanese bread. Through this policy, MET supports bakeries and mills by providing in-kind wheat flour deliveries to reduce production cost and ensure mills and bakeries still have a profit margin on the standard 900 gram bread package.

== Foreign investment ==
There are few restrictions on foreign investment, barring Israeli citizens and entities. There are no country-wide U.S. trade sanctions against Lebanon, although Hezbollah and individuals associated with it have been targeted by the American government. Foreign ownership of real estate is legal under certain conditions.

According to a report by The Wall Street Journal, "Lebanon has one of the world's highest public debt-to-gross domestic product ratios, rising to over 150% as it takes on more debt to plug budget holes." In January 2019, in a move to boost the economy of Lebanon and help the country overcome its debts, Qatar pledged to buy $500 million's worth of government bonds. In June 2019, Bloomberg reported that Qatar had bought some of the bonds and planned to complete the rest of the investment soon.

=== Remittances ===
Lebanon benefits from its large, cohesive, and entrepreneurial diaspora. Over the course of time, emigration has yielded Lebanese "commercial networks" throughout the world. Consequently, in 2009, remittances from Lebanese abroad to family members within the country totaled $8.2 billion and accounted for one fifth of the country's economy. Nassib Ghobril, the head of research and analysis for Byblos Bank, calculates that Lebanese abroad supply Lebanon with about $1,400 per capita every year.

== Investment ==
The stock market capitalization of listed companies in Lebanon was valued at $9.6 billion in January 2019, down from $11.5 billion in January 2018

Lebanon was unable to attract significant foreign aid to help it rebuild from both the long civil war (1975–89) and the Israeli occupation of the south (1978–2000). In addition, the delicate social balance and the near- dissolution of central government institutions during the civil war handicapped the state as it sought to capture revenues to fund the recovery effort. Thus it accumulated significant debt, which by 2001 had reached $28 billion, or nearly 150% of GDP. Economic performance was sluggish in 2000 and 2001 (zero growth in 2000, and estimates between 1.0 and 1.4% in 2001, largely attributed to slight increases in tourism, banking, industry, and construction). Unemployment is estimated at 14% for 2000 and 29% among the 15-24-year age group, with preliminary estimates of further increases in 2001. However, many Lebanese expatriates have been able to return to the country due to the negative financial situations they are facing abroad, due to the global economic crisis. Also, more job opportunities are attracting more Lebanese youths for a chance to return and work in Lebanon, and also a benefit for the Lebanese living in the country, graduating from universities.

== Corruption ==
According to NGO Transparency International Lebanon ranks 138th out of 180 countries surveyed in the Corruption Perceptions Index. A poll conducted by Transparency International in 2016 indicated that 92% of Lebanese thought that corruption had increased that year. Additionally, 67% of the respondents indicated that they believed that the majority of the political and economical elites were corrupted, and 76% indicated that the government was doing poorly when it came to fighting corruption.

As of July 2020, Riad Salamé, governor of Banque du Liban (the country's central bank) since 1993, has had his assets frozen, and is facing an October hearing accused of the embezzlement of central bank assets, and the mismanagement of public funds.

The already suffering country was struck by a huge explosion on 4 August 2020. The explosion devastated the Port of Beirut and destroyed many houses, leaving almost 300,000 people homeless. This explosion has led to the demolition of the country's main harbor that was used to import food.

== Inequality ==
The top 1% richest adults receive approximately a quarter of the total national income, placing Lebanon among the most unequal countries in the world. The bottom 50% of the population is left with 10% of total national income.

Lebanon is characterized by a dual social structure, with an extremely rich group at the top, whose income levels are comparable to their counterparts in high-income countries, and a much poorer mass of the population, as in many developing countries. This polarized structure reflects the absence of a broad "middle class": While the middle 40% receives more than the share accruing to the top 10% in Western Europe, and a bit less in the US, it is left with far less income than the top 10% in Lebanon (between 20 and 30 p.p less). The richest captured most of the income growth since 2005: The top 10% saw its income increase by 5 to 15%, while the bottom 50% saw it decrease by 15% and the poorest 10% by a quarter.

Lebanese billionaires' wealth represents on average, between 2005 and 2016, 20% of national income as opposed to 2% in China, 5% in France, and 10% in the US.

== Fiscal haven ==
In 2018, Lebanon ranked 11th on the Financial Secrecy Index. Lebanon has a strong history of banking secrecy but has taken steps to fight money laundering and tax evasion in recent years. As of January 2019, banking secrecy applies to Lebanese nationals living in Lebanon but is not applicable to US citizens and US fiscal residents since the FATCA agreement was introduced. Lebanon is part of the Global Forum on Transparency and Exchange of Information for Tax Purposes and has signed an agreement to exchange fiscal data with other countries, but as of January 2019, it is not compliant with certain provisions of the treaty.

On the 24th of April 2025, a bill to amend the banking secrecy law was passed, allowing all regulatory bodies and banking supervisors to request access to all information.

Ali Hassan Khalil, Finance Minister, confirmed that 2019's draft budget showed a deficit of less than 9% of GDP compared to 11.2% in 2018. Khalil also claimed that the economic growth forecast of 1.5 percent could go up to 2% in 2019.

== Salaries of Lebanese ==
Marina Towers, Beirut

On 15 October 2011, after various unions, including the teachers' union, the general worker's union and others threatened to strike, the minimum wage was raised by 40% (£L200,000 - $133) to £L700,000 ($466). Most unions went ahead with the strike except the general worker's union.

- Wages between minimal wage and £L1,200,000 ($800) were increased by £L200,000 ($133) to become £L700,000 (minimal wage) and £L1,400,000 ($933) respectively.
- Wages more than £L1,200,000 up to £L1,700,000 ($1,133) were increased by £L300,000 ($200) to become £L1,500,000 ($1,000) and £L2,000,000 ($1,333).
- Wages above £L1,800,000 ($1,200) were not increased.

The increase in wages was welcomed by most Lebanese but it also sparked criticism by some worker's unions, saying that the increases were not up to expectations, especially that employees earning more than $1200 were not entitled to raises. Others criticized the raises altogether citing that it would burden small business that might end up closing altogether; those critics were mainly opposition politicians.

As of 2013 World Bank analysis of Quality Life Index, it was estimated that:

- 15% of the Lebanese people lives below the poverty line ($2,500)
- 54% of the Lebanese people lives in the moderate middle class ($9,000) annually. ▲12% from 1998
- 32% of the Lebanese people lives in the upper middle class ($15,000–27,000) annually. ▼19% from 1998
- 7% of the Lebanese people lives in the highest upper class ($30,000 and above) annually ▲1% from 1998

== Macro-economic statistics ==
Exports of Lebanon by product category (2019) Chemical products Transportation Machines Mineral products Plastics and rubbers Metals Foodstuffs Precious metals Textiles Instruments Animal products Vegetable products Paper goods Footwear and headwear Miscellaneous Stone and glass Wood products Animal and vegetable bi-products Animal hides Arts and antiques Weapons

The following table shows the main economic indicators in 1986–2025. Inflation below 5% is in green. The annual unemployment rate is extracted from the World Bank, although the International Monetary Fund find them unreliable.

Year	GDP (in bn. US$PPP)	GDP per capita (in US$ PPP)	GDP (in bn. US$nominal)	GDP per capita (in US$ nominal)	GDP growth (real)	Inflation rate (in Percent)	Unemployment (in Percent)	Government debt (in % of GDP)
1980	22.2	7,475.4	4.0	1,356.5	▲1.5%	▲23.9%	n/a	n/a
1981	▲24.4	▲8,055.0	▼3.8	▼1,269.4	▲0.6%	▲19.3%	n/a	n/a
1982	▼16.4	▼5,330.7	▼2.6	▼853.6	▼−36.8%	▲18.6%	n/a	n/a
1983	▲20.9	▲6,716.8	▲3.6	▲1,162.3	▲22.7%	▲7.2%	n/a	n/a
1984	▲31.2	▲9,874.9	▲4.3	▲1,349.5	▲44.5%	▲17.6%	n/a	n/a
1985	▲40.1	▲12,414.6	▼3.6	▼1,105.1	▲24.3%	▲69.4%	n/a	n/a
1986	▼38.1	▼11,516.7	▼2.8	▼840.3	▼−6.8%	▲95.4%	n/a	n/a
1987	▲45.6	▲13,439.9	▲3.3	▲959.7	▲16.7%	▲487.2%	n/a	n/a
1988	▼33.9	▼9,797.4	3.3	▼945.7	▼−28.2%	▲155.0%	n/a	n/a
1989	▼20.3	▼5,771.3	▼2.7	▼760.7	▼−42.2%	▲72.2%	n/a	n/a
1990	▼18.3	▼5,085.4	▲2.8	▲779.3	▼−13.4%	▲68.9%	n/a	n/a
1991	▲26.1	▲7,121.0	▲4.4	▲1,197.9	▲38.2%	▲50.1%	8.6%	n/a
1992	▲27.9	▲7,450.8	▲5.5	▲1,461.0	▲4.5%	▲99.8%	▼8.2%	n/a
1993	▲30.6	▲8,004.4	▲7.4	▲1,946.9	▲7.0%	▲24.7%	8.2%	n/a
1994	▲33.7	▲8,674.3	▲9.0	▲2,311.7	▲8.0%	▲8.2%	▲8.3%	n/a
1995	▲36.7	▲9,260.8	▲11.0	▲2,770.6	▲6.5%	▲10.3%	▲8.4%	n/a
1996	▲38.8	▲9,629.8	▲12.8	▲3,178.9	▲4.0%	▲8.9%	8.4%	n/a
1997	▲43.5	▲10,601.4	▲15.5	▲3,782.1	▲10.2%	▲7.7%	▲8.6%	n/a
1998	▲45.8	▲10,948.8	▲17.1	▲4,082.3	▲3.9%	▲4.5%	8.6%	n/a
1999	▲46.0	▼10,830.2	▲17.2	▼4,040.8	▼−0.8%	▲0.2%	▲8.8%	n/a
2000	▲47.6	▲11,014.4	▼17.0	▼3,938.8	▲1.1%	▼−0.4%	▼8.6%	148.1%
2001	▲50.6	▲11,518.8	▲17.4	▲3,955.3	▲3.9%	▼−0.4%	▼8.5%	▲163.1%
2002	▲53.1	▲11,939.2	▲18.8	▲4,236.3	▲3.4%	▲1.8%	▼8.2%	163.1%
2003	▲55.1	▲12,222.1	▲19.5	▲4,325.6	▲1.7%	▲1.3%	▼8.1%	▲171.3%
2004	▲60.8	▲13,285.6	▲21.2	▲4,625.2	▲7.5%	▲1.7%	▼7.9%	▼169.5%
2005	▲64.2	▲13,833.7	▲21.5	▲4,630.0	▲2.5%	▼−1.4%	▲8.2%	▲178.9%
2006	▲67.2	▲14,245.6	▲22.0	▲4,665.9	▲1.5%	▲4.1%	▲8.7%	▲183.3%
2007	▲75.5	▲15,695.2	▲24.8	▲5,162.0	▲9.3%	▲4.1%	▲9.0%	▼169.3%
2008	▲83.9	▲17,170.0	▲29.1	▲5,957.7	▲9.1%	▲10.7%	▼7.7%	▼161.5%
2009	▲93.1	▲18,799.3	▲35.4	▲7,149.8	▲10.2%	▲1.2%	▼6.4%	▼144.5%
2010	▲101.7	▲20,361.8	▲38.4	▲7,695.2	▲8.0%	▲4.0%	▲6.8%	▼136.8%
2011	▲104.7	▲20,757.3	▲39.9	▲7,914.1	▲0.9%	▲5.0%	▲7.4%	▼134.4%
2012	▲109.6	▲21,172.9	▲44.0	▲8,499.8	▲2.8%	▲6.6%	▲8.0%	▼131.1%
2013	▲115.7	▼20,379.1	▲46.9	▼8,253.1	▲3.8%	▲4.8%	▲8.5%	▲135.4%
2014	▲120.6	▼19,226.0	▲48.1	▼7,661.0	▲2.5%	▲1.9%	▲8.8%	▲138.5%
2015	▲122.4	▼19,120.6	▲49.9	▲7,797.0	▲0.5%	▼−3.7%	▲9.3%	▲140.9%
2016	▲125.5	▲20,055.8	▲50.6	▲8,087.8	▲1.6%	▼−0.8%	▲9.8%	▲147.9%
2017	▲128.8	▲21,079.6	▲52.9	▲8,655.8	▲0.8%	▲4.4%	▲10.3%	▲150.4%
2018	▲132.5	▲22,141.3	▲55.3	▲9,239.6	▼−1.9%	▲6.1%	▲10.8%	▲154.0%
2019	▼126.1	▼21,753.2	▼51.0	▼8,797.8	▼−6.6%	▲2.9%	▲11.3%	▲171.9%
2020	▼72.3	▼12,671.6	▼23.5	▼4,119.5	▼−28.7%	▲84.9%	▲13.3%	▼158.1%
2021	▼60.0	▼10,498.4	▼19.8	▼3,466.9	▲1.6%	▲154.8%	▼12.7%	▲357.5%
2022	▲65.2	▲11,357.0	▲23.3	▲4,048.9	▲1.4%	▲171.2%	▼11.1%	▼260.3%
2023	▲67.4	▲11,670.0	▲25.9	▲4,490.2	▼−0.5%	▲221.3%	▼11.0%	▼175.6%
2024	▼65.5	▼11,286.4	▲30.5	▲5,247.7	▼−5.2%	▲45.2%	n/a	▼152.0%
2025	▲69.9	▲11,958.3	▲34.5	▲5,897.5	▲4.0%	▲14.6%	n/a	▼139.4%

== See also ==
- List of companies of Lebanon
- List of Lebanese by net worth
- Banque de Syrie et du Liban
- Banque du Liban (Central Bank)
- Beirut Central District
- Hezbollah social services
- Illegal drug trade in Lebanon
- Labour movement in Lebanon
- Lebanese pound
- Lebanon and the World Bank
- Migrant domestic workers in Lebanon
- Ministry of Economy and Trade (Lebanon)
- Ministry of Finance (Lebanon)
- Poverty in Lebanon
- Solidere
- 2025 Lebanese bank reformation
- Beirut One Conference
- Financial gap law (Lebanon)
