= Iranian fuel export to Lebanon =

Petroleum shipment

Flags of Iran (left) and Lebanon (right)

In 2021, Iran sent five fuel tankers, all under the flag of Iran, to Lebanon. Since the financial crisis of Lebanon in August 2019, the country is experiencing a chronic shortage of fuel. The tankers were loaded from Iranian ports, after reaching the Syrian port, be trucked to Lebanon. Shipment delivery was made for Hezbullah.

== Background ==
In August 2019, due to various financial problems, the black market exchange rate began to change from the official exchange rate. The USD black market exchange rate remains to fluctuate substantially due to the devaluation of the Lebanese pound caused by sharp USD shortages within Lebanon. The Lebanese pound has lost about 90% of its value. The Guardian reported: the resulting hyperinflation, made by adverse trading situations during the COVID-19 pandemic, grossly irresponsible financial mismanagement of Lebanon's politicians and bankers, has caused subsidies of essential foodstuffs, medicine, and fuel to no longer cover their true cost. Fuel shortages have made extensive electricity cuts and led to long lines at filling stations. The World Bank has declared one of the world's worst economic crises since the mid-1800s.

== Export by Iran ==
On 19 August 2021, Hassan Nasrallah, secretary-general of Hezbollah announced on televised speech Iranian fuel will sail from Iran toward Lebanon "within hours". Before, Nasrallah claimed: Tehran has accepted to trade with Lebanon using the Lebanese pound. On 2 September, the first Iranian ship arrive at Syria's Mediterranean port in Baniyas. On 13 September, Nasrallah said: the first Iranian fuel ship has reached Syria for land transfer. Then, the fuel shipment was transported by tanker trucks via Syria to the eastern Lebanese town of Baalbek. It would arrive in Lebanon by 16 September. On 24 September, Nasrallah claimed that a second Iranian fuel vessel has arrived in the Syrian port, also a third and a fourth fuel vessel sails towards Lebanon. They respectively carrying gasoline and fuel oil.

Nasrallah claimed in his speech: at the first, the fuel will be donated to institutions like orphanages, public hospitals, water stations, nursing homes, and the Lebanese Red Cross for one month.

=== Payment ===
Nasrallah claimed: the cost of the fuel were paid by Lebanese Shia businessmen.

== Reactions ==
=== Lebanon ===
Nasrallah said: our aim is not to trade or profit but also our aim is to alleviate the suffering of the people. He warned the Zionist regime and the U.S. against intercepting Iranian fuel vessels since as they are considered Lebanese territory.

On 1 September 2021, the energy minister of Lebanon, Raymond Ghajar said: the Lebanese government has not received any request to import fuel from Iran.

Hussein Hajj Hassan and Ali Hamieh New Public Works & Transport Minister of Lebanon, claimed The US Blockade on Lebanon is broken.

Prime Minister of Lebanon, Najib Mikati said in CNN interview, The Lebanese government has not intervened in the operation. He called the operation a violation of Lebanese sovereignty.

According to The New York Times and the BBC, the Lebanese people celebrated the arrival of the first fuel trucks. they thanked Iran, Hezbollah, and Bashar al-Assad while carrying their flags.

=== Iran ===
Hossein Amir-Abdollahian, current foreign minister of the Islamic Republic of Iran, said: we will supply the Lebanese government's need for fuel and will help them to resolve the problems faced due to the fuel shortage. Previously, he said Iran had sold fuel to a "Lebanese businessmen".

=== Israel ===
Amnon Shefler, Israeli military spokesman, claimed: This is Iran's attempt to export its revolution and promote its agents.

== See also ==
- Iran–Lebanon relations
- Petroleum industry in Iran
