= Lebanese liquidity crisis =

Ongoing crisis in Lebanon

The Lebanese liquidity crisis is an ongoing financial crisis affecting Lebanon, that became fully apparent in August 2019, and was further exacerbated by the COVID-19 pandemic in Lebanon (which began in February 2020), the 2020 Beirut port explosion and the Russian invasion of Ukraine. The country experienced liquidity shortages in the years prior to 2019 but the full extent of the fragility of the economy was concealed through financial engineering by the governor of the central bank. Lebanon's crisis was worsened by sanctions targeting Syria's former government and Iran-backed Hezbollah, which intensified under President Donald Trump.

The currency was devalued by over 98% between January 2023 and March 2024, with an annual inflation rate of 221.3% in 2023. Public services have collapsed; without using a private generator, households can expect only an hour or so of power a day. Shortages of drinking water have contributed to disease outbreaks, including the first cholera cases in decades. Parents are sending their children to orphanages because they cannot feed them. A growing number of citizens have resorted to armed robbery as the only way to extract their own deposits (now vastly reduced in real terms) from banks when they desperately need to pay for basic services such as healthcare. The collapse of Lebanon, formerly known as the "Paris of the Middle East", has been described by Western media as one of the most devastating and worst financial recessions since at least the 19th century.

== Background ==
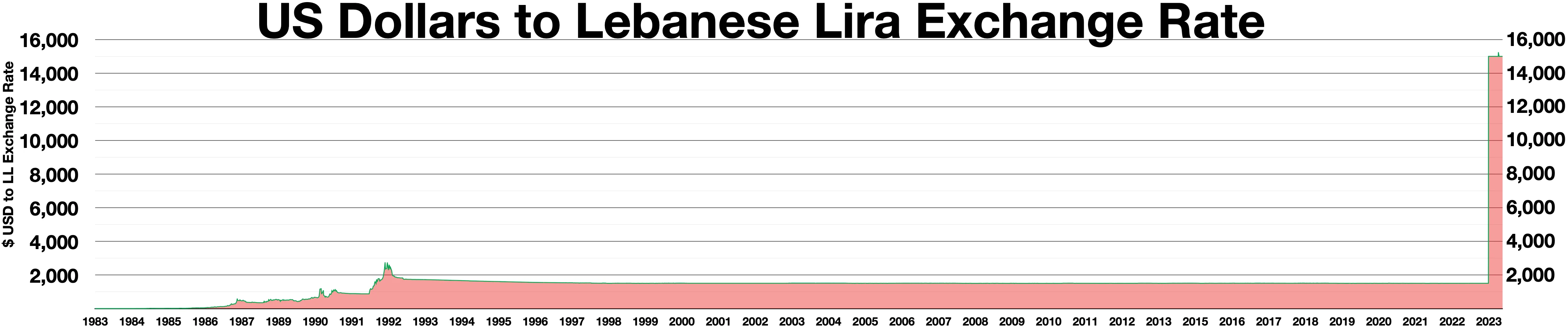
USD to Lebanese Lira exchange rate

From 1997 to October 2019, the Lebanese lira was pegged to the US dollar at a rate of £L1,507.5 to the US dollar. The stability of the lira was the cornerstone of the Lebanese central bank policy for over two decades. It was meant to bring about much-needed stability to the country after a severe devaluation of the Lebanese pound following the end of the Lebanese Civil War (1975–1990).

The economy of Lebanon in the post-war period relied on different sources of foreign currency inflows that were critical to maintain this currency peg: tourism, real estate, remittances from the diaspora, a financial sector that offered depositors anonymity through banking secrecy and high interest rates. These inflows were critical to fund the large trade deficit and the growing public debt.

In 2016, Lebanon first witnessed a real slow down in foreign inflows: Between May 2015 and May 2016, the dollar liquidity of the country decreased for the first time in 11 years. As a result, the central bank of Lebanon initiated a series of financial engineering operations which became known in the press as "the swap". The central bank exchanged public debt it owed in Lebanese pounds against Eurobonds, or debt labelled in foreign currency, for the equivalent of US$2 billion. Between June and October 2016, the central bank exchanged these Eurobonds against actual foreign currency with a selection of commercial banks. As a result, the Lebanese economy managed to avoid the consequences of a liquidity crisis at the time, but it increased the public debt considerably in dollars and cost the entire economy a fortune: the International Monetary Fund estimated that the banks that took part in the operation made US$5 billion while the central bank pull-out cost was US$13 billion in foreign currency. If these figures are correct, the banks involved made a 40% return on the overall transaction. The central bank repeated similar financial engineering in the years that followed.

However, even with these operations, Lebanon kept failing to attract sufficient foreign inflows to match the growing demand. As early as late 2018, some commercial banks started to restrict depositors' access to their own funds in foreign currency: they usually imposed an additional fee on cash withdrawal in US dollars to deter clients from withdrawing dollar cash.

In August 2019, due to various financial hardships, especially the growing probability that the Lebanese government would default on maturing debt obligations, the black market exchange rate started diverging from the official exchange rate.

Following the first large demonstration of the 17 October Revolution in 2019, Lebanese commercial banks closed for an unprecedented two weeks. When they reopened, commercial banks unlawfully restricted depositors' access to their own money in US dollars – despite no official capital control. These restrictions were one of the key factors that decreased the confidence of Lebanese people in their own currency and pushed the value of the Lebanese pound below its official exchange rate.

In the fourth quarter of 2019, the black market exchange rate reached £L1,600 to the dollar, and increased to £L3,000 per dollar in April 2020, £L14,000 per dollar in March 2021 and £L15,200 per dollar in June 2021. One bank allowed depositors to withdraw Lebanese pounds from their dollar account at £L2,000 to US$1. This caused significant anger towards the banks, with the prime minister sharply criticizing the governor of the central bank over its performance. The USD black market exchange rate continues to fluctuate substantially due to devaluation of the Lebanese pound caused by acute dollar shortages within Lebanon. This dollar shortage also caused 785 restaurants and cafes to close between September 2019 and February 2020, and resulted in 25,000 employees losing their jobs. Consumer goods prices had increased by 580% since October as a result of the worst economic crisis in decades. The economic crisis made Lebanon's gross domestic product fall to about $44 billion from about $55 billion the year before.

The dollar shortage was further exacerbated by the large amount of Lebanese pounds that the central bank printed from 2019 onward. Data from the Lebanese central bank (BDL) suggest that the money supply M1 grew by 266% from December 2019 to December 2021.

== Consequences ==
2023 VOA report about bars and restaurants during the crisis

The fall of the exchange rate caused the 17 October Revolution in 2019, which ultimately resulted in the resignation of Prime Minister Saad Hariri and his cabinet. Following this, the COVID-19 pandemic forced additional businesses to close their doors and to lay off their employees.

Prime Minister Hassan Diab stated that the country would default on its Eurobond debt and seek out restructuring agreements amid a spiralling financial crisis that affected foreign currency reserves. Lebanon was due to pay a US$1.2 billion Eurobond on 9 March 2020, with another $700 million expected to mature in April and a further $600 million in June. Due to the lack of foreign currencies, the prime minister said that the reserves had fallen to "a worrying and dangerous level which pushes the Lebanese government to suspend payment of the 9 March Eurobond maturity because of a need for these funds."

The head of research at Bank Audi stated that Lebanese banks owned $12.7 billion of the country's outstanding $30 billion Eurobonds as of January 2020. The central bank held $5.7 billion and the remainder was owned by foreign creditors.

The default is the first one in the history of the country. Foreign currency inflows slowed and Lebanon's pound dropped in value. The nation's commercial banks imposed tough restrictions, on dollar withdrawals and transfers, to maintain reserves. Due to this, Lebanon's sovereign debt became junk rated.

The shortage of US dollars, which are used in everyday transactions in Lebanon, and the crash in the value of the pound have undercut the country's ability to pay for imports, including essentials such as wheat and oil. Banks have stopped giving short-term loans to businesses and no longer provide them with US dollars for imports, forcing people to turn to the black markets. There is also significant inflation, which caused a massive loss of purchasing power and an increase in poverty. The price of foule or ful, a fava bean common in the region, was up 550% in March 2020 over a year earlier. Sugar has seen an increase of 670%, while wheat, tea, rice, and cigarettes have all gone up nearly 1,000% over the same period.

This liquidity crisis also created a barrier to everyone with accounts in Lebanese banks, as they are unable to access their deposits. Not only are they unable to access their deposits, but they are unable to withdraw any dollars directly. They can withdraw them in the national currency. These depositors needed to preserve the value of their savings, especially following press reports about restructuring of the banking sector. They therefore turned to buying real estate. For example, revenues from land sales of the major real estate developer, Solidere, soared from nearly $1.3 million to $234.5 million. Also, these depositors turned to buying shares in Solidere company, which lead to a rise of 500% in it between the start of the liquidity crisis and April 2021. Of the 7 million Lebanese, about 80% live below the poverty line, while an estimated 100,000 people are wealthy and can import "fresh money" into the country and afford to frequent downtown Beirut restaurants and stores.

On 1 June 2021, the World Bank released a report which warned that the economic crisis in Lebanon would risk becoming one of the three most severe since the mid-19th century, if its "bankrupt economic system, which benefited a few for so long" were not reformed. On 11 August 2021, the Lebanon central bank ended fuel subsidies, announcing that they would instead offer "credit lines for fuel imports based on the market price for the Lebanese pound". The decision led to significant increases in fuel prices amid an economic crisis in the country, but the government was unable to alleviate shortages. Days later on 15 August 2021, in the 2021 Akkar explosion, 33 people were killed in a fuel explosion in the northern Akkar District, exacerbated by the widespread fuel shortages. On 9 October 2021, the country underwent a 24-hour full blackout as the two biggest electricity generators, Zahrani and Deir Ammar, ran out of fuel. Public utilities are only able to offer electricity for a few hours a day because they are unable to buy fuel to power central generators, leading to a massive increase in the number of people buying more expensive power from private generators.

In December 2021, BBC News reported that the economic crisis has caused shortages in the import of vital medicines. Rising unemployment (reaching a peak of 13.27% in 2020), a depreciating local currency, skyrocketing inflation, and the removal of subsidies for medicines and fuel have made it harder for many people to meet their basic needs.

In September 2022, Lebanese Association of Banks announced that the banks would close for three days after depositors, who in 2019 overnight found themselves locked out of their bank accounts and unable to access the majority of their own savings, stormed several branches, holding employees hostage and forcibly demanding to withdraw their savings.

In February 2023, Lebanon devalued its official exchange rate for the first time in 25 years, weakening it by 90% but still leaving the local currency well below its market value due to the ongoing liquidity crisis.

During the liquidity crisis, Lebanon received humanitarian and financial assistance from Saudi Arabia, Kuwait, Turkey, the United States, and the European Union.

As of 2025, the Lebanese lira has stabilized at roughly 89,000 LBP against the US dollar without being vulnerable to inflation as it was in previous years. In September 2026, Lebanon announced that it selected Alvarez & Marsal to carry out a new audit covering financial transactions from 1 October 2019 through to 31 December 2023.

=== Bank robberies and sit-ins ===
Beginning in January 2022, several armed depositors have carried out a series of bank robberies and sit-ins at bank locations to withdraw their own money. The bank robbers have been described as folk heroes, and none have faced prosecution as of November 2022.

== Riad Salameh trials ==
In February 2022, a subpoena was issued by Judge Ghada Aoun after central bank governor Riad Salameh failed to show up to court for questioning, while his whereabouts were unknown after a raid in his office and two homes, as part of an investigation for alleged misconduct and corruption. This sparked controversy with another security agency that was accused of protecting him from trial. Later on 21 March, Salameh along with his brother Raja were charged for illicit enrichment by Ghassan Oueidat, but also failed to attend for questioning. Raja spent a month in detention, but was released on May 22 while on a record bail of LBP100 billion.

On 21 June 2022, Salameh's home was raided again by the Internal Security Forces.

In February 2023, Riad Salameh was charged with money laundering, embezzlement and illicit enrichment, following an 18-month investigation into allegations that he and his brother embezzled $300,000,000 from the Banque du Liban between 2002 and 2015. In January 2026 it was reported that the case against, Riad Salameh is being transferred to the country's highest criminal court.

== See also ==
- Impossible trinity
- List of stock market crashes and bear markets
- Currency crisis
- Government debt
- Economic impact of the COVID-19 pandemic
- 2021–2023 inflation surge
- Sovereign default
- State collapse
- Sri Lankan economic crisis (2019–2024)
