= Hezbollah social services =

Hezbollah has a social development programs organized among the Lebanese Shiite population, historically one of the poorest and most neglected communities in Lebanon, stems partly from the social services it provides. Social services have a central role in the party's programs, closely linked to its military and politico-religious functions.

Most experts believe that Hezbollah's social and health programs are worth hundreds of millions of dollars annually. The American think tank Council on Foreign Relations also said that Hezbollah "is a major provider of social services, operating schools, hospitals, and agricultural services for thousands of Lebanese Shiites." The expansiveness of these services has helped Hezbollah remain deeply embedded in Lebanese society. It has also facilitated its integration into the Lebanese political scene.

However, these services are not aimed at every section of the Lebanese population. The Shia community in present-day Lebanon may potentially motivate Hezbollah to address a history of deprivation by prioritizing the well-being of in-group members. In the past, the Shiites did not have access to the same resources and infrastructure as other religious groups, such as the Sunnis, Druze and Christians had.

== Summary ==
Hezbollah organizes an extensive social development program and runs hospitals, news services, educational facilities, and encouragement of Nikah mut‘ah. Some of its established institutions are: Emdad committee for Islamic Charity, Hezbollah Central Press Office, Al Jarha Association, and Jihad Al Binaa Developmental Association. Jihad Al Binna's Reconstruction Campaign is responsible for numerous economic and infrastructure development projects in Lebanon. Hezbollah has set up a Martyr's Institute (Al-Shahid Social Association), which guarantees to provide living and education expenses for the families of fighters who die in battle.

In March 2006, an IRIN news report of the UN Office for the Coordination of Humanitarian Affairs noted:

"Hezbollah not only has armed and political wings - it also boasts an extensive social development program. Hezbollah currently operates at least four hospitals, twelve clinics, twelve schools and two agricultural centres that provide farmers with technical assistance and training. It also has an environmental department and an extensive social assistance program. Medical care is also cheaper than in most of the country's private hospitals and free for Hezbollah members".

According to CNN: "Hezbollah did everything that a government should do, from collecting the garbage to running hospitals and repairing schools."

== Overview ==
=== Healthcare ===
The Islamic Health Committee is a Hezbollah-affiliated organization providing health services to the general population; these include several hospitals, more than a hundred medical centers, ambulance services, dental offices, infirmaries and mental health providers. This organization also runs civil defense centers.

There are also organizations run by Hezbollah that deal primarily with Hezbollah members or their families. The Martyrs Foundation was established to help families of killed Hezbollah members, while the Foundation for the Wounded was established to take care of injured Hezbollah members. An Israeli source says there is "ambiguity" whether the latter also treats non-Hezbollah civilians.

Since a larger amount of the money received from Iran goes to military operations (because of a shift in interest under Iran), the available money in Hezbollah's services has been cut. In 2021 Iranian fuel was exported to Lebanon by Hezbollah. Nasrallah claimed in his speech that the fuel will first be donated to institutions like orphanages, public hospitals, water stations, nursing homes, and the Lebanese Red Cross. After the 2023 Turkey–Syria earthquake Hezbollah sent humanitarian aid to Syria.

=== Education ===
Hezbollah maintains a comprehensive set of educational institutions, under its Education Unit, which cater to Lebanese Shiite youths. Some institutions are directly linked to the party while others are merely associated. The main thrust of Hezbollah's Education Unit is in Al-Mahdi schools of the Islamic Establishment for Teaching and Education network. Congruent to Al-Mahdi schools, are the Al-Mustapha schools which are associated with Hezbollah through one of the party's leaders Naim Qassem. Whereas Al-Mustafa schools are mainly based in the southern suburbs of Beirut, the Al-Mahdi schools are based in Baalbek, Sidon, and Tyre. The Hezbollah Education unit also runs the Al-Mahdi scouts. All these institutions are influenced by Hezbollah but not officially under its ownership. These institutions function as ideological apparatuses that disseminate Hezbollah's values and doctrine into the Lebanese Shiite youth.

=== Infrastructure ===
Hezbollah's main institution in charge of construction and urban maintenance undertakings is Jihad Al-Binaa established in 1985. The origins of the intuition lie in the Israeli invasion and Lebanese civil war. The institution's main task was (re-)constructing homes for people who lost their homes due to Israeli attacks. Later, the institution expanded its activities to include building schools and other Hezbollah institutions, supplying water, and waste disposal. During the Israeli aggression between 1988 and 1991, Jihad Al-Bina’ re-constructed over 1000 homes that were damaged. In July 2006, during the war with Israel, when there was no running water in Beirut, Hezbollah, through Jihad Al Binaa, was providing supplies around the city. "People here [in South Beirut] see Hezbollah as a political movement and a social service provider as much as it is a militia, in this traditionally poor and dispossessed Shiite community." Also, in the aftermath, it competed with the Lebanese government to reconstruct destroyed areas. According to analysts like American University Professor Judith Palmer Harik, Jihad al-Binaa has won the initial battle of hearts and minds, in large part because they are the most experienced in Lebanon in the field of reconstruction.

== Distribution of Social Services and Political Agenda ==
Hezbollah provides social services to a diversity of Lebanese citizens. Hezbollah's social services focus primarily on Shiite Lebanese. However, Hezbollah also offers social services to Lebanese citizens outside of the Lebanese Shia community. Still, Hezbollah prioritizes servicing its committed party members. Hezbollah's Shiite supporters can be divided into committed members and sympathizers. Committed members take part in high risk and time intensive activities which serve the party, while sympathizers rarely go beyond casting votes for the party, they may join demonstrations, but require incentives to become active. Hezbollah's distribution of social services is aligned with the party's political agenda. The change in Hezbollah's distribution of social services policy from exclusively focusing on Shiite Lebanese to the inclusion of other sectarian portions of Lebanese society occurred after the end of the Lebanese civil war, specifically in the early 2000s.

=== Social Provisions for Shiite Lebanese ===
==== Committed Party Members ====
Hezbollah offers expensive and long term social welfare to a small portion of their adherents who execute the parties’ venturesome quasi-state tasks, such as military action. Hezbollah's social services original raison d’etre was catering to the needs of its most committed members, namely, its fighters. Hezbollah has been providing unconditional and unpublicized social and financial aid to the families of fighters since the early days of the party in 1982.

In comparison with the Amal movement, Hezbollah's less dominant Shiite rival party, Hezbollah is more oriented towards serving its committed members. Nevertheless, both Hezbollah and the Amal Movement invest in social provision for other sectarian groups alongside Shiite Lebanese. While Hezbollah has more recently employed a strategy that links its distribution of welfare to election calculations, areas that are predominantly Shia and are potential recruiting grounds for militia men and activists, such as the southern suburbs of Beirut, gain extensive social welfare support. This is done despite their electoral insignificance.

Located in predominantly Shia areas, namely the southern suburbs of Beirut, South Lebanon, and the Bekaa, the Martyrs’ Institution and the Institution of the Wounded are quintessential examples of social service institutions dedicated to servicing committed party members, specifically the families of Hezbollah's fighters that are injured or killed in action. The Martyrs’ Institution aids families of killed fighters by supplying them with occupational opportunities, education, and health care. The Institution of the Wounded offers reparations and healthcare to fighters and civilians injured due to the Israel-Hezbollah conflict.

Shiite Non-member Sympathizers

During the civil war period, the rivalry between the two parties compelled Hezbollah to emphatically direct its distribution of social services towards Lebanese Shiites in order to secure their loyalty. Hezbollah's support from the Lebanese Shiite community has grown exponentially, in 2012, a poll by the Pew Research Center indicated that 94% of Lebanese Shiites support Hezbollah.

Hezbollah has managed to utilize the distribution of social services as an incentive to encourage Lebanese Shiite to express their support for the party through political activism. Lebanese Shiites take part in political demonstrations, among other activities, so that they can receive welfare benefits such as food and healthcare. The reception of social services is conditioned by their supportive initiative and enthusiasm, not by their socio-economic status or dedication to religious beliefs. In this way, Hezbollah has developed a Lebanese Shiite “resistance society,” in which members have the incentive to proactively support the party. Accordingly, Hezbollah carry out screenings of recipients of social services, in order to determine their eligibility depending on their political stances and actions vis a vis the party.

=== Provisions for Non-Shiite Lebanese (The Alliance with the Christian Free Patriotic Movement) ===
Hezbollah's intention to participate in Lebanese governmental politics incentivized the expansion of its social services. Hezbollah underwent a process of “Lebanonization”, which entailed refraining from employing violent means domestically, and the dilution of their dogmatic beliefs and goals which go against accepting the sectarian pluralism of the Lebanese political institutional landscape. Specifically, Hezbollah reneged on its goal of establishing an Islamic state in Lebanon. This process began in the late 1980s, and reached its zenith in the early 2000s. Correspondingly, the inclusion of non-Shiite Lebanese in Hezbollah's social services facilitated the integration of Hezbollah into the Lebanese political system and augmented its legitimacy. According to a report from the Pew Research Center, Hezbollah has significant support from Lebanese Christians (31%), and modest support from Lebanese Sunnis (9%).

As part of its political integration process, in 2006, Hezbollah established an alliance with the Christian Free Patriotic Movement in Lebanon, named the Mar Mikhael Agreement. This was an effort to gain more votes. As a result, Hezbollah began accommodating Christians who support the Free Patriotic Movement through their social provisions. The distribution of social services for the Christian supporters of the Free Patriotic Movement exhibits the inextricable link between Hezbollah's election strategy and social services. Particularly, Hezbollah began expanding its social provisions to non-Shiites in districts which were critical to the elections. Amsheet is a Christian village with a relatively weighty Shiite population, in which Hezbollah's Islamic Health Organization operates. Hezbollah's efforts, during the period of between 2005 and 2009, to expand their social services in Jbeil yielded positive results in the district for the party in the 2009 elections.

While there is a policy of Lebanese Shiite prioritization in Hezbollah's social services institutions, most of the time non-Shiite Lebanese are accommodated. Third party NGOs confirm that Hezbollah's healthcare institutions cater regularly to local Christians and Sunnis. Still, it is unequivocally apparent that Hezbollah's social services institutions are located in predominantly Shiite areas. Moreover, there have been instances where such institutions have rejected the requests of non-Shiites that are not local to the area and travel to areas with Hezbollah's institutions to seek aid.

== Iran's influence in Hezbollah social services ==
Already during the formation of Hezbollah, Iran played a key role. During the 1970s, the Shiite population lived in poor condition in the outskirts of Lebanese cities. This was compounded by the government's inability to provide necessary services to families in need. The absence of those necessary needs caused a vacuum, which was filled by Islamists, including some from Iran. From 1982 on, Iran started to support Hezbollah significantly in terms of money. It is estimated that the Islamic Republic of Iran supports Hezbollah between 700 million and up to 1 billion dollar per year.

=== Education ===
A significant amount of the money received from Iran goes to the financial costs of private schools. Lebanon's education system consists of both state and private schools. These schools follow a Shiite doctrine. The education of the Shiite schools are based on the ideology of the Islamic Republic of Iran. Some of the main principles of this ideology include: promoting the glorification of both Ruhollah Khomeini and Ali Khamenei, fostering support for 'resistance' against Israel, valueing of the deed 'Shahada' (willingness of becoming a martyr and becoming a martyr itself) and worshipping those who have become a martyr under Hezbollah's ideology. The system of these schools include two networks: the Al-Mahdi school network, which is established in 1993 and the Al-Mustafa School network. The Al-Mahdi School network also has a school opened in the Iranian city of Qom, where it provides education for Lebanese Shiites interested in religious studies. This school has a reasonable tuition, which explains why Shiite families with lower income send their children to the Al-Mahdi school. On the other hand, the Al-Mustafa schools are for students coming from richer Shiite families or from Hezbollah senior figures.

=== Healthcare ===
Moreover, in the field of health care, Iran's contribution can also be seen. According to the Lebanese radio station Al-Nour, Hezbollah has shown better organization and results compared to other factions in Lebanon while fighting corona in the Shiite regions. The results have largely been achieved through Iran's infrastructure funding. In the Imam Khomeini City, a hostel and youth movement complex have been converted into a quarantine place to receive a large number of corona patients. This also includes 54 staff members. In addition, several hospitals have been converted to accommodate a higher number of corona patients. An example of this is the Dar al-Hikma hospital.

In addition, after the destruction of many houses during the fight between Hezbollah and Israel, Lebanon was in need of reconstruction. A large amount of money was sent by Iran through its partner Hezbollah with reconstruction as the purpose. Most of Iran's fundings went to the rebuilding of Dahiya, a Shiite suburb in the south part of Beirut.

=== Hezbollah's Martyrs Foundation ===
During the 1982 Lebanon War, the Hezbollah Martyrs Foundation was established as a branch of the Iranian Martyrs Foundation. The foundation was created by the idea of supporting the families of Palestinian martyrs. By doing so, the foundation creates better services to families who have needs in the social, educational and medical sphere. In addition, the foundation also organizes various projects and activities, such as the visits to holy tombs, the distribution of clothes and food, appreciation ceremonies for martyrs and it also provides organized tours to orphans.

Although much of the major expenditure is financed by Iran, it is also important to note that part of the financing of social services is covered by tuition, fundraising and charitable projects.
