= Lebanon and the World Bank =

Lebanon and World Bank relations

Lebanon's involvement with the World Bank Group began in August 1955 with the funding of the Litani Power and Irrigation project. As of 2017, 62 years after its entrance into the organization, Lebanon has 21 World Bank projects active throughout the nation, and as of May 2017 has received about $1 billion in financial aid and investment from the group. From 2011 onward, the World Bank and its subordinate organizations have been concerned with aiding Lebanon in its role as host to an influx of refugees from the Syrian Civil War. The Country Partnership Framework for Lebanon stated that the goals of World Bank intervention in the country are to "expand access to and increase quality of service delivery, increase economic opportunity and increase human capital." The Syrian crisis has strained Lebanon's public finances, service delivery, and the environment.

== Recent projects ==
Recent infrastructure and service projects in Lebanon include the Greater Beirut Water Supply, the Emergency Primary Healthcare Restoration Project, the Lake Qaraoun Pollution Prevention Project, and a Roads and Employment Project. Current programs funded by the World Bank Group to invest in the social fabric and quality of life in Lebanon include the Reaching All Children with Education in Lebanon Support Project, the Additional Financing for Emergency National Poverty Targeting Program and the Emergency Education System Stabilization program.

The majority of World Bank Group financing for Lebanon is in the form of infrastructure investment from the International Bank for Reconstruction and Development. Consistent with its goal to aid in poverty reduction and promoting employment and GDP growth, the World Bank's International Finance Corporation promotes private sector growth in Lebanon via diversified investment in financial, construction and retail corporations, bolstered by investment guarantee protections provided by the Multilateral Investment Guarantee Agency. Additionally, the group's International Development Association has pledged $100 million in aid earmarked for projects and programs meant to provide resources to effectively respond to the impact of the Syrian Refugee Crisis on Lebanon.

During the 2016 World Bank Group - International Monetary Fund Spring Meetings, the organizations announced the creation of the Global Concessional Financing Facility for the Middle East and North Africa. This donor-funded facility is intended to allow countries hosting refugees from the Syrian Civil War, such as Lebanon and Jordan, access to concessional financing and increased coordination for developmental projects. The GCFF was coordinated by the World Bank Group to assist nations housing refugees, and is funded by 6 European states, the European Commission, Japan, Canada and the United States.

== See also ==
- World Bank Group
- International Monetary Fund
- Lebanon
