= Poverty in Lebanon =

Poverty in Lebanon refers to a variety of situations. First, it refers to individuals and households who live below the poverty threshold, set as a money-metric measurement. This approach is the most basic and universal measure of poverty. However, research and surveys in Lebanon allowed for the emergence of a more complex concept: multidimensional poverty. Multidimensional poverty takes into account aspects of deprivation that may not relate to financial constraints: Residents in Lebanon may be deprived of health care, medicine, services, or education even when they are not materially poor.

Lebanon used to be considered a middle income country before the 2019 banking and economic crisis but, even at the time, inequalities were among the highest in the world and 28% of the population lived below the poverty line, according to a study carried out by the Central Administration of Statistics and the World Bank in 2011. In 2021, as the country experienced a severe economic crisis, the United Nations estimated than more than eighty-two percent of the population lived in multidimensional poverty.

== Historical background ==
According to Fawwaz Traboulsi, Lebanon has always dealt with poverty as an external and foreign element of Lebanon's society. Back when Greater Lebanon was established, he argues that poor were pictured as coming from "the annexes and regions added to Mount Lebanon and the coast to form Greater Lebanon." This impacted policy making very strongly as poverty became a topic outside of society's concern and in a sense became apolitical.

According to Lama Karame, poverty and welfare in Lebanon thus became the preserve of notables and religious institutions. Until today, poverty in Lebanon is mostly dealt with from the angle of charity and donation and not from the perspective of citizens' rights and state obligations.

=== Chehab era (1958–1964) ===
During the six years of Fouad Chehab's presidency, Lebanon developed the first national plan to provide social welfare and tackle poverty. He was the first to adopt the slogan of "balanced development": He aimed at ensuring that Lebanon's most deprived regions also benefit from the economic boom the country witnesses. In 1959, Chehab established the Department of Social Welfare to deal with poverty, following the 1958 war. But according to Karame, Chehab ran into obstacles with existing, sectarian civil institutions, that competed in the same field. As a result, Chehab compromised: The Department of Social Welfare mostly implemented its policies through these private bodies and funded their operations, rather than deploy a purely public policy.

The period however witnessed a real improvement of living conditions among Lebanese residents. In 1959, Chehab commissioned the IRFED (Institut de Recherches et de Formation en vue de Développement) to organize a nation-wide study. It aimed at helping the Ministry of the Plan identify, among others, the social and economic needs of the population. The study is completed in 1963 and the Ministry of the Plan never built on it to inform its master plan for the development of Lebanon. However, it helped the Ministry of the Plan adopt a series of programs that actually bore fruits. By 1974, Lebanon had paved the roads to all villages, brought potable water to 94% of Lebanese and electricity from the grid to 99%.

=== Civil war (1975–1990) ===
According to Karame, the Lebanese civil war promoted the same logic of the civil sector at the expense of the state. Each party to the conflict developed its own charity structure to support its population following an approach based on clientelism.

In 1977, the use of the Ministry of the Plan is debated among politicians as it failed to implement any plan thus far. The same year, the Arab Fund for Economic and Social Development (AFESD) wanted to support Lebanon in its reconstruction effort. But it requested a unique interlocutor to operate on the ground. Hence a decree law (5/1977) replaced the Ministry of the Plan with the Council for Development and Reconstruction (CDR) which became the main vehicle for international aid money.

== Measuring poverty in Lebanon ==
Lebanon's official statistics are extremely scarce: the last, country-wide, population census was performed in 1932. As a result, official figures on poverty are limited.

The central administration of statistics (CAS), together with the World Bank, have nonetheless worked on measuring poverty using several proxies. In 2004 and again in 2011–2012, CAS and the World Bank performed household budget surveys to estimate the level of deprivation among Lebanese families. These surveys are proxies and the solidity of their results have been questioned by the very team who performed them.

=== The 2011–2012 household budget survey ===
The 2011–2012 household budget survey estimated that 27% of the total population was leaving below the poverty line, set at £L4,729,000 per person per year (US$3,137 at the official exchange rate at the time).
