= Bisri Dam =

Planned dam in Lebanon

The Bisri Dam is a planned dam on the Bisri river in Lebanon. The dam is part of the Lebanon Water Supply Augmentation project, with water management as the primary purpose. The project is organised by the Government of Lebanon in order to tackle water scarcity issues in Lebanon and specifically in the Greater Beirut and the Mount Lebanon area. The expected funding for the project was coming from the World Bank, the Islamic Development Bank, and the Government of Lebanon, and it is executed by the Lebanese Council for Development and Reconstruction. The Bisri dam project started on September 30, 2014, and is projected to end by June 30, 2024. The dam is planned to be located 35 kilometres south of Beirut in Bisri Valley, close to the village of Bisri. Due to its impact on the environment, archaeological sites, agriculture as well as seismic risk the dam project has faced opposition from civil society, political parties, adjacent municipalities and also internationally.

On April 17, 2020, in response to criticism from civil society, the World Bank announced that it had frozen funding for the project. On September 4, 2020, the World Bank announced that it was cancelling its funding for the dam.

== Background ==
The area of Greater Beirut is at the moment supplied by the karstic limestone aquifers of Mount Lebanon from the cavern outflows at Jeita and piped to the capital via the Dbaiyeh Treatment Plant. The area faces droughts especially during summer times. The water tapping from the Jeita spring is inefficient and there is a 30% water loss between Jeita and Dbayeh. Most households have alternative supplies to maintain access to water. Examples of alternative supplies are private wells or bottled water.

Lebanon has already two other dams: the Faraya-Chabrouh dam and the Litani River Dam. The Faraya-Chabrouh dam is located above the village of Faraya (approximately 40 kilometres NE of Beirut) and it was inaugurated in 2007. The dam is 63 metres tall, around 1300 metres long and the reservoir's capacity is around 8 million cubic metres (MCM). The location of the dam is in a rural area of Lebanon surrounded by farmland. The water from the Faraya-Chabrouh dam is meant to be used to irrigate the surrounding agricultural land. The Faraya-Chabrouh dam projects consists of the dam itself, as well as an abduction line and a water treatment plant.

The Litani River dam was established in 1959 on the Litani River, creating the biggest artificial lake in Lebanon. The lake takes up around 12 square kilometres and holds approximately 220 million cubic metres (MCM). The dam is 60 metres high, 1,350 metres long, and 162 metres broad. The size of the dam itself is around 2 MCM. On average, the Litani basin carries around 700 MCM of water flow annually (based on 25 years of measurements from 1941 to 1971). Depending on precipitation, however, the Litani basin's flow varies from year to year. In 1970, the release from the basin reached its minimum of 184 MCM, whereas the maximum of 1020 MCM was measured in 1954. The current estimate is an average annual flow of 920 MCM. Compared to the Jordan River, the Litani River, which is about 170 kilometres long, is smaller in terms of water flow.

The Litani River's water is of high quality. As an example, its salt concentration is 20 parts per million, which is relatively low compared to for instance 250-350 parts per million for the Sea of Galilee.^{[1]} The Litani River is located inside the borders of Lebanon: It starts in central Beqaa Valley in the north, relatively close to Baalbek to the west, and from there it flows between the western Lebanon mountain and the eastern Anti-Lebanon Mountains towards the south and south-west. The river enters a gorge at Qarun and continues through it for 30 kilometres. Around Nabatieh and the Beaufort Castle the river turns towards west and breaks through the mountains. It then flows through the elevated landscape in the al-Amal region, and north of Tyre it empties into the Mediterranean.^{[2]}

== Finances ==
=== The financial costs ===
The financial costs of the Water Supply Augmentation project are estimated to be US$617.000 million in total. The financing comes from three sources: The World Bank, the Islamic Development Bank, and the Government of Lebanon. The specific amounts are as follows:

- US$474 million was pledged by the World Bank
- US$128 million was pledged the Islamic Development Bank
- US$15 million are financed by the Government of Lebanon as the recipient of the loans

=== Financial aid and foreign donors ===
The World Bank ^{[4]} is an international financial institution that provides loans^{[5]} to countries for the purpose of pursuing capital projects. It comprises two institutions: the International Bank for Reconstruction and Development (IBRD), and the International Development Association (IDA). The World Bank is a component of the World Bank Group. The International Bank for Reconstruction and Development (IBRD) has 189 member countries, while the International Development Association (IDA) has 173 members. Each member state of IBRD should also be a member of the International Monetary Fund (IMF) and only members of IBRD are allowed to join other institutions within the Bank (such as IDA).^{[1]} The World Bank's most recent stated goal is the reduction of poverty.^{[6]} For the poorest developing countries in the world, the bank's assistance plans are based on poverty reduction strategies; by combining a cross-section of local groups with an extensive analysis of the country's financial and economic situation the World Bank develops a strategy pertaining uniquely to the country in question. The government then identifies the country's priorities and targets for the reduction of poverty, and the World Bank aligns its aid efforts correspondingly.

The Islamic Development Bank (IsDB) (Arabic: البنك الإسلامي للتنمية) is a multilateral development finance institution that is focused on Islamic finance located in Jeddah, Saudi Arabia.^{[2]} There are 57 shareholding member states with the largest single shareholder being Saudi Arabia.^{[3]} The present membership of the Bank consists of 57 countries. The basic condition for membership is that the prospective member country should be a member of the Organisation of Islamic Cooperation (OIC), pay its contribution to the capital of the Bank and be willing to accept such terms and conditions as may be decided upon by the IDB Board of Governors. IDB has evolved into a group of five Entities, consisting of Islamic Development Bank (IDB), Islamic Research & Training Institute (IRTI), Islamic Corporation for Development of the Private Sector (ICD), Islamic Corporation for Insurance of Investment and Export Credit (ICIEC) and International Islamic Trade Finance Corporation (ITFC). IDB Group is engaged in a wide range of specialized and integrated activities such as: Project financing in the public and private sectors; development assistance for poverty alleviation; technical assistance for capacity-building; economic and trade cooperation among member countries; trade financing; SME financing; resource mobilization; direct equity investment in Islamic financial institutions; insurance and reinsurance coverage for investment and export credit; research and training programs in Islamic economics and banking; awqaf investment and financing; special assistance and scholarships for member countries and Muslim communities in non-member countries; emergency relief; and advisory services for public and private entities in member countries.

After missing many deadlines for satisfying the conditions for the World Bank loan, the World Bank terminated its funding to the project, citing three reasons: 1) The ecological compensation plan was not finalized with the involvement of relevant stakeholders; 2) the maintenance and operation plan was not finalized; and 3) the contractor was not mobilized by the agreed upon deadline.

== The water flow and technical features ==
The water that should be captured by Bisri dam will reach Joun Lake. This lake is to be filled from various sources (e.g. Awali river, Ain Zarwa Spring, Jezzine Springs, and Lake Qaraoun). According to the World Bank, the water is projected to be treated at a water treatment plant in Wardanieh. In addition, the project aims for the water to be safe to drink, by meeting either Lebanese drinking standards (LIBNOR NL 161) and/or EU standards (98/83/EC), whichever is the more stringent. Once the water is treated it should flow through a distribution system providing water to 1.6 million residents in Greater Beirut and Mount Lebanon.

== Benefits of the Bisri dam ==
With the construction of the Bisri dam, the Lebanese government aims to reduce the chronic water shortages that still affect the country. According to the World Bank, the dam will provide the 1.6 million people who live across the Greater Beirut & Mount Lebanon (GBML) with better access to water. It will especially increase the purchasing power of the 460,000 people of this region who live on less than $4 a day by reducing reliance on water bottles and tanks.

== Social and environmental impacts of the Bisri dam ==
The Lebanese Council for Development and Reconstruction carried out an Environmental and Social Impact Assessment (ESIA) as a part of the project preparation. This was allegedly done in cooperation with civil society, governmental agencies, the private sector, as well as the local community. The Lebanese Ministry of Environment reviewed and approved the ESIA. Based on the ESIA, an Environment and Social Management Plan (ESMP) has been developed, including mitigation measures to social and environmental impacts. Nevertheless, these measures have failed to convince a substantial proportion of civil society, which claims that the development of the Bisri dam is mired with corruption.

=== Resettlement and needs of local inhabitants ===
A Resettlement Action Plan has also been developed, explaining the details of the land expropriation and resettlement process. The resettlement plan was widely consulted with the affected landowners and their delegates. This plan is also subject to an independent review apparatus, which overlooks its implementation. The continuous expropriation of land affects 861 landowners out of whom 96 live in the area and depend on the land for income and livelihood. In accordance with World Bank policies, all landowners are given cash compensation in accordance with replacement costs.

To provide support for affected inhabitants, a Grievance Redress Mechanism has been launched. Affected inhabitants are able to raise complaints and seek remedies through this mechanism, which is thoroughly monitored by the World Bank as well as independent environmental and social expert panels. Affected communities can also benefit from the project through the Benefit-Sharing Program. This program promotes employment opportunities, improves community services and social welfare, and ensures that the local communities benefit from the continuous development of the project.

In regard to the impact on local communities, the World Bank Regional Director for the Middle East, Saroj Kumar Jha, states:

"The project was designed according to international best practice in reducing the impacts on local communities. Those who will be impacted by the project are entirely accounted for and measures are put in place to ensure that their livelihoods are sustained and concerns are addressed."

=== Environmental and safety concerns ===
As Lebanon is located on a major tectonic plate boundary, the country suffers from frequent structural movements. The Bisri dam is to be constructed on a seismic fault line, which is why the Lebanese government has allegedly designed the dam in accordance with advanced seismic hazard assessment and design. According to the World Bank, the dam will be equipped with seismic monitoring instruments, which will monitor the dam's structure continuously. According to the ESIA, the main concerns are the large quantity of events, their widespread occurrence, the risk of more catastrophic events, and particularly the allocation of events in the vicinity of Bisri Valley. It was confirmed by an independent international expert panel who reviewed the project that 1) the dam can withstand the most severe earthquakes; and 2) that the dam itself will not cause earthquakes. The panel consists of internationally acclaimed technical experts specializing in dam engineering, geology, and seismology. However, a 2019 paper published in Engineering Geology warns that the Bisri dam is planned in one of the most critical locations of the Roum fault, a strand of the Dead Sea Transform fault system. The dam site coincides with the same location that hosted the epicenter of the destructive 1956 Chim earthquake. Furthermore, according to the study the water reservoir and the dam may itself trigger seismicity.

In order to mitigate impacts on the biodiversity of the area, a comprehensive Biodiversity Action Plan (BAP) was developed. According to the World Bank, this is based on a thorough ecological investigation including all major levels: amphibians, reptiles, macro-invertebrates, and location and habitat usage details on flora, mammals, birds, and fish. The BAP aims to compensate fully for impacts on biodiversity with the ideal result of 'net gains' and the minimum result of 'no loss'. This will be obtained through an ecological offset for the local habitats to be lost under the reservoir. This implies translocation of some species to conserve and/or strengthen the existing natural habitats. The Ministry of Environment and a specialized team of environmental experts collaborate closely on monitoring the ESMP in relation to biodiversity. The financing of the BAP is part of the total cost of the project.

A number of cultural and archaeological sites such as the Mar Moussa church and the remains of the Saint Sophia monastery are impacted by the construction of the Bisri dam. These sites are planned to be relocated close to their original location under the monitoring of the Maronite church authorities and the parishioners. Under the supervision of the Lebanese Directorate General of Antiquities, these archaeological sites will be investigated, documented, and preserved as required. They will continuously be accessible to parishioners and tourists. The World Bank is supporting the Ministry of Culture in the preservation of cultural and archaeological sites, and this work will be financed by the project.

== Criticism ==
In response to the creation of the Bisri dam, several concerns were raised by scientists and political figures. A national campaign was also initiated to contest the dam project.

=== Scientific concerns ===
One of the main concerns is the impact of the Bisri dam on the larger ecosystem and water supply in the Bisri valley. The Bisri fault and the Roum fault are interconnected and therefore whatever happens on either side with influence the other. There is thus a fear that the Roum fault will receive less water than before.

Other environmental concerns include the fear for earthquakes within Lebanon, but also in the larger region of Jordan, Palestine and Israel. The earthquakes are caused by the reservoir-triggered seismiticity effect which means that the weight of the water will shift rocks below the surface. Similar issues were for instance seen with a dam created in China which resulted in an earthquake in 2008.

=== Political opposition ===
Elias Hankash is one of the Lebanese MP's that spoke out against the construction of the Bisri Dam. Hankash urged the authorities to consider the viewpoints of environmentalists and other experts before continuing with the project. Activists fear that the creation of the Bisri Dam will harm at least fifty archaeological sites and various green areas.

=== The National Campaign to Protect the Bisri Valley ===
In protest to the Bisri dam project, a coalition of civil society activists launched a National Campaign to Protect the Bisri Valley (Arabic: الحملة الوطنيّة للحفاظ على مرج بسري). The campaign demands that the World Bank withdraws its financial support for the Bisri Dam, that the Lebanese government aborts the project and adopts alternative water management solutions.

The campaign claims that the dam project poses a threat to the valley's distinctive natural habitats. With its pine forest and widespread shallow water, it constitutes an important habitat for migratory birds, some of which are protected under the Agreement on the Conservation of African-Eurasian Migratory Waterbirds, which Lebanon is party to.

It alleges that the historical value of the valley should preclude the construction of the dam. Indeed, it affirms that the valley abounds of historical sites, comprising 83 sites upstream and 29 downstream that date back to the Bronze Age, the Persian, Hellenistic, Roman, Byzantine, Mameluke and Ottoman Periods.

According to the Campaign, around 57% of the impacted area holds a productive agricultural activity, with an estimated US$125 million of annual revenue, which would be brought to naught by the dam's completion.

Roland Riachi, the Campaign's coordinator, explained in an interview that the region's porous rocks may prevent the dam from storing water. Riachi argues that the Lebanese Government should instead encourage sustainable water use and address the many inadequacies of current water infrastructure. This includes fixing the network's physical failures, reforming the groundwater sector, investing in submarine springs as well as in nature-based solutions for water.

== Response to criticism ==
The World Bank claims to have addressed the concerns and criticism of the area's residents in the following ways.

=== Before the implementation of the project ===
Between April 2012 and May 2017, the Council for Development and Reconstruction conducted various public meetings and focused groups. During these meetings discussions were organised between the funders, the residents, local non-governmental organisations and civil society movements. The World Bank stated to be continuously committed to conversations with non-governmental organisations that oppose the Bisri dam project. The meetings between the non-governmental organisations and the Independent Panel of Experts are recorded and translated to ensure transparency.

=== Response to the environmental concerns ===
The World Bank continues to discuss the environmental and societal concerns raised by the various groups and individuals mentioned before. The World Bank upholds a strict policy on biodiversity called the Operational Policy 4.04 on Natural Habitats. For examples, in case of the Bisri dam the World Bank will translocate numerous flower species.

== The assessment of alternative solutions ==
The Lebanese National Strategy for Water concluded that the construction of a dam in Bisri Valley was a way to ensure safe drinking water to Lebanon's residents by capturing and utilizing its water resources effectively. During the design of the project, the Water Supply Augmentation team undertook a comparative study of four dam sites (Bisri, Janna, Damour East, and Damour West), which examined the technical, economic, environmental, and social aspects analysing alternatives. The study concluded that the Bisri area is most suitable for the dam. The two main reasons for this decision are: 1) the volume of the reservoir and its annual recharge is sufficient to meet the predicted needs of the area to 2030 and beyond; 2) the Bisri-Awali valley is located so that it can use existing transmission lines, treatment plant, and bulk storage reservoirs, thereby increasing the water supply efficiency and return on the investment.

The study also showed that a combination of dam actions and non-dam actions such as ground are required to meet the water demands of Greater Beirut and Mount Lebanon from a long-term perspective. The non-dam actions include improved groundwater management, desalination, demand management, and reuse of treated wastewater. The construction of the Bisri dam is therefore one of a number of coordinated efforts made to ensure water security in these areas at least until 2035.
