= Chabrouh Dam =

Bituminous face rockfill dam in Keserwan District, Lebanon

Faraya-Chabrouh Dam
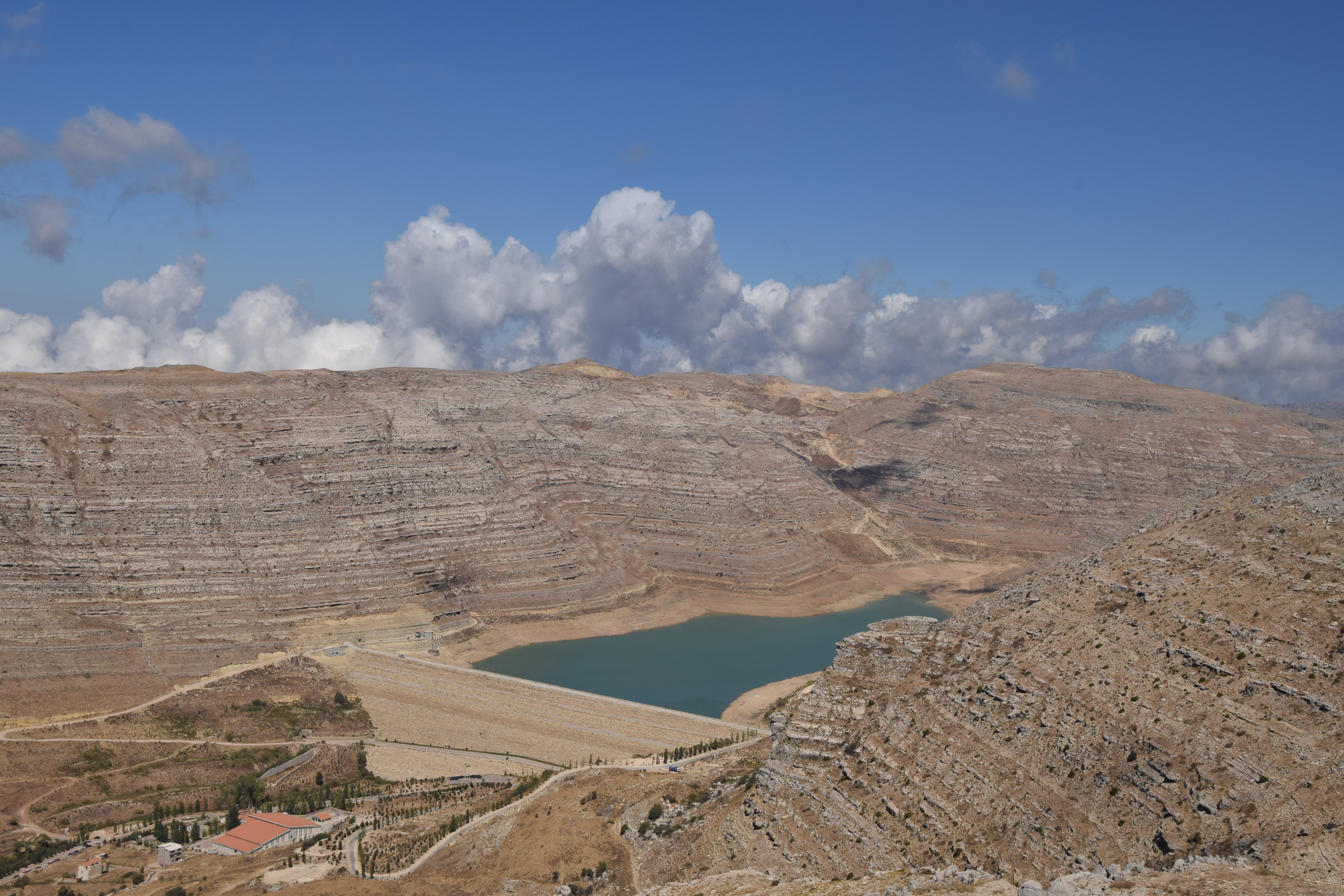
- View of the Chabrouh Dam reservoir and surrounding karstic terrain
- Interactive map of Faraya-Chabrouh Dam
- Official name: Chabrouh Dam
- Country: Lebanon
- Location: Faraya, Keserwan District, Mount Lebanon Governorate
- Coordinates: 34°01′49″N 35°50′07″E
- Status: Operational
- Construction began: 2002
- Opening date: 2007
- Construction cost: Approx. US$85 million
- Built by: Andrade Gutierrez (Brazil) & Mouawad-Edde (Lebanon) consortium
- Owners: Ministry of Energy and Water
- Operators: Beirut and Mount Lebanon Water Establishment

Dam and spillways
- Type of dam: Bituminous face rockfill dam (BFRD)
- Height: 65 metres (213 ft)
- Length: 470 metres (1,542 ft)
- Elevation at crest: 1,618 metres (5,308 ft)
- Width (crest): 10 metres (33 ft)
- Width (base): 200 metres (656 ft)
- Dam volume: 1,550,000 cubic metres (2,027,323 cu yd)
- Spillways: 1 morning-glory ("tulip") overflow shaft spillway
- Spillway capacity: 180 cubic metres per second (6,357 cu ft/s)

Reservoir
- Creates: Chabrouh Reservoir
- Total capacity: 9,000,000 cubic metres (7,296 acre⋅ft)
- Active capacity: 8,000,000 cubic metres (6,486 acre⋅ft)
- Maximum length: 1,300 metres (4,265 ft)

The Faraya-Chabrouh Dam (commonly referred to as the Chabrouh Dam) is a high-altitude bituminous face rockfill dam (BFRD) situated on the Wadi Chabrouh torrent in the upper reaches of the Keserwan District, Mount Lebanon Governorate, Lebanon. Located at an elevation of approximately 1,600 meters above sea level and roughly 40 kilometers northeast of the capital city of Beirut, the civil engineering asset serves as a critical infrastructure node in managing Lebanon's asymmetric seasonal water resources.

Inaugurated in 2007, the dam represents the second-largest reservoir facility in Lebanon. It was specifically engineered to capture seasonal alpine snowmelt and high-altitude precipitation during the winter and spring cycles, conserving water to mitigate severe municipal and agricultural deficits during the arid summer and autumn months. The reservoir provides treated potable water to an estimated 250,000 residents across the Keserwan region, balancing water security against complex regional hydrogeological and environmental challenges.

== Historical Context and Project Genesis ==
The management of hydraulic infrastructure remains a cornerstone of national security and public health in post-civil war Lebanon. Preliminary topographical and hydrological feasibility studies aiming to exploit the steep, narrow gorge of Wadi Chabrouh were initially conducted by state engineering consultants in 1979. Due to socio-political instability, the project was shelved until 1999, when it was formally integrated into a national master plan by the Ministry of Energy and Water to modernize surface storage assets and build climate resilience.

The administrative and structural development of the project was executed in close coordination with the Faraya Municipality. Construction commenced in 2002 and concluded with the official impoundment and inauguration ceremonies in 2007. The project was executed by an international joint venture comprising the Brazilian civil engineering conglomerate Andrade Gutierrez and the prominent Lebanese contracting firm Mouawad-Edde s.a.r.l.

To optimize logistical execution, the overall project lifecycle was segmented into three distinct contractual lots:

- Lot 1 (Dam Structure): Excavation, structural filling, and placement of the upstream sealing slab.
- Lot 2 (Adduction Pipeline): Construction of a 5,190-meter-long gravity-fed adduction line linking the high-altitude Nabaa El Laban spring directly to the reservoir basin.
- Lot 3 (Water Treatment Infrastructure): Engineering a dedicated downstream filtration and chlorination plant to process raw reservoir water for municipal distribution.

== Technical Architecture and Design ==
=== Structural Profile ===
The Chabrouh Dam was engineered as a bituminous face rockfill dam (BFRD), a structural morphology selected for its inherent flexibility, stability against local seismic faults, and capacity to withstand extreme high-altitude freeze-thaw cycles without fracturing. The main embankment features a maximum height of 63 to 65 meters from the foundational bedrock, spanning a crest length of 470 meters and a crest width of 10 meters. The base width extends to approximately 200 meters at its widest foundational footprint.

The structural matrix consists of over 1.55 million cubic meters of zoned hard limestone rockfill, carefully graded and compacted. Material was sourced from two primary quarries located within a 5-kilometer radius of the construction site. The upstream face of the embankment is sealed by a 37,000-square-meter bituminous concrete liner. This 22-centimeter-thick impermeable barrier is constructed using multi-layered technology: a 10 cm thick base binder layer topped with two separate 6 cm layers of dense asphaltic concrete designed to dynamically adjust to micro-settlements within the underlying rockfill material.

=== Hydrological and Hydraulic Systems ===
The catch basin of the reservoir relies primarily on targeted inflows from the Nabaa El Laban spring, capturing substantial runoff from the surrounding Mount Lebanon range to establish a gross storage capacity of approximately 8 to 9 million cubic meters (MCM).

The dam’s hydraulic safety features include a specialized morning-glory, or "tulip," overflow shaft spillway. The spillway structure measures 11.2 meters in diameter at its lip and drops into a 50-meter-deep vertical shaft, which is connected to a 410-meter-long concrete-lined diversion tunnel. This system is capable of safely discharging up to 180 cubic meters per second (m³/s) of flash flood water downstream, preventing catastrophic overtopping of the main rockfill embankment. Primary water draws for municipal processing are regulated by a 7.2-meter-diameter intake tower fitted with an 800 mm diameter adduction pipe and specialized butterfly valves.

== Hydrogeological Challenges and Seepage ==
Despite its strategic importance, the operation of the Chabrouh Dam has been complicated by the karstic hydrogeology of the Mount Lebanon region. Approximately 65% of Lebanon’s surface terrain consists of carbonate rocks (limestone and dolomite) highly susceptible to chemical weathering, which forms subterranean conduits, caves, and sinkholes.

Comprehensive geological tracing and isotopic evaluations conducted post-impoundment identified a significant subsurface leakage bypass migrating through the right embankment abutment. Subsurface water losses through the karstic channels of the adjacent Qana Plateau have been documented between 22,000 and 33,000 cubic meters per day. Engineering data has confirmed that this escaping volume does not represent a complete loss to the national water balance; rather, the leaked water re-emerges downstream, increasing the natural discharge of the nearby Qana and Hadid springs by up to 89% following full reservoir impoundment. Remedial grouting curtains have been intermittently injected into the bedrock foundations to control the rate of karstic seepage.

== Environmental Regulations and Watershed Protection ==
=== The 2025 Access Ban ===
In August 2025, the Ministry of Energy and Water, acting on technical directives from the Faraya Municipality, issued an absolute prohibition on all public, mechanical, and recreational activities within the immediate perimeter of the Chabrouh Dam reservoir.

The regulatory intervention was prompted by a specialized multi-disciplinary scientific study assessing water quality risks. The report highlighted severe ecological and sanitary vulnerabilities, warning that motorized watercraft (such as jet-skis) caused petroleum hydrocarbon pollution and heavy acoustic disruptions. Furthermore, high-velocity mechanical activities triggered severe water turbulence that resuspended fine bottom sediments—an operational risk noted by independent engineering consultants as early as 2013.

Because the immediate watershed lacks localized sanitary, solid waste, and stormwater management infrastructure capable of supporting heavy tourist crowds, strict containment became necessary. This urgency was compounded by acute regional drought cycles during the 2024–2025 winter season, which dropped the reservoir volume to roughly 30% of its active capacity. State authorities and municipal representatives entered into exploratory talks with international development donors to design low-impact, non-motorized eco-tourism initiatives (such as kayaking and rowing), but preserving raw water standards for the 250,000 municipal consumers remains the definitive priority.

=== Ecological Reforestation ===
To counter soil erosion along the barren slopes encircling the reservoir, long-term ecological restoration programs have been implemented by non-governmental organizations, notably Jouzour Loubnan. These initiatives focus on planting native cedar and juniper species within dedicated plots. These areas are strictly protected from livestock grazing to establish a natural vegetative buffer zone, stabilizing peripheral topsoil and reducing sediment deposition within the reservoir basin.

== See also ==
- List of dams in Lebanon
- Water supply and sanitation in Lebanon
- Geography of Lebanon
