= Water supply and sanitation in Lebanon =

Data
- Access to an improved water source: 100%; 80% access to piped water supply (2008)
- Share of collected wastewater treated: Low
- Continuity of supply: Average of 6 hours per day in summer and 9 hours per day in winter with wide disparities between regions (2008)
- Average urban water use (L/person/day): 150 (estimated)
- Average urban water and sanitation tariff (US$/m^{3}): US$159 per year flat fee, corresponding to US$0.97/m3 (Beirut in 2008)
- Share of household metering: 16% in Beirut-Mount Lebanon (2010); zero in some other areas
- Annual investment in WSS: US$129m (late 90s and early 2000s)
- Share of self-financing by utilities: low
- Share of external financing: 73% for water, 56% for wastewater (Council for Development and Reconstruction only)
- Non-revenue water: about 40%

Institutions
- Decentralization to municipalities: Limited to sanitation
- National water and sanitation company: No
- Water and sanitation regulator: CDR
- Responsibility for policy setting: Ministry of Energy and Water
- Sector law: Water Law 221/2000
- Service providers: 4 Governmental Regional Water Establishments

Water supply and sanitation in Lebanon is characterized by a number of achievements and challenges. The achievements include the reconstruction of infrastructure after the 1975–90 Civil War and the 2006 war with Israel, as well as the reform of the water and sanitation sector through a water law passed in 2000. The law created four Regional Water Establishments to consolidate numerous smaller utilities.

The challenges include poor service quality, in particular intermittent water supply that persists despite the availability of relatively abundant water resources; the slow implementation of the water reform; the separation of responsibilities between various entities such as the Council for Development and Reconstruction, which are de facto in charge of investment, and the Regional Water Establishments, which are in charge of operation and maintenance; limited institutional capacity in the public sector, and in particular the Regional Water Establishments; politicization of decision-making; the absence of an autonomous regulatory agency; poor information about water resources, sector performance and assets; a very low share of metering and the absence of volumetric water tariffs; a high level of water distribution losses; limited cost recovery for water supply; and no cost recovery for sewerage and wastewater treatment. These challenges persist more than two decades after the end of the Civil War.

The Lebanese water and sanitation sector has received and continues to receive substantial foreign aid in the form of grants and soft loans from a dozen Western and Arab donors.

== Access ==
According to UN estimates that are not based on any household survey, access to an improved water source in Lebanon is universal. The UN figures on water access may not give an accurate picture of the real situation: A representative survey carried out by the World Bank in 2008 estimated that the average connection rate to the public water network was 80%, varying from 96% in Beirut to 55% in the North. These figures are similar to those that came out of a 2004 Household Living Conditions Survey carried out by the Lebanese Central Administration of Statistics. Even considering that improved water sources include protected wells and springs in addition to piped water connections, it is unlikely that water access in Lebanon is universal. For example, many urban households that are not connected to the network rely on water bought from tanker trucks.

The UN statistics show no data on access to sanitation in Lebanon. The World Bank quotes estimates by the Council for Development and Reconstruction showing a 58% share of connection to sewers in 2002. Wastewater collection was highest in Beirut-Mount Lebanon (74%) and lowest in the South (35%). The remaining buildings either use cesspools and septic tanks or simply release raw sewage directly into the environment. A census of Buildings and Establishments in 1996–97 had estimated that only about 37% of the buildings in Lebanon were connected to a sewer network at that time, indicating that the share increased substantially between 1997 and 2002.

== Service quality ==
The quality of water service provision is poor. According to official figures from 2009, the average water availability per day was as follows: 22 hours in the North, 10 hours in the Bekaa, 8 hours in the South, and for Beirut-Mount Lebanon 13 hours in winter, but only 2 hours in summer. There is not a single village or city in Lebanon that receives an uninterrupted residential supply of water. Especially in summer, water shortages are common. For example, in Nabatieh Governorate water reached customers only three times a week in 2007. In Greater Beirut, water supply drops to 3 hours per day during the summer. According to the above-mentioned 2008 survey, the average Lebanese household received 6 hours per day in summer and 9 hours in winter. Only one quarter of Lebanese households received water every day. The continuity of supply was best in the North where 59% said they received water every day in 2008. It was worst in Beirut where this share was only 10%. Poor water quality and intermittent supply impose high costs on households to cope with these deficiencies. Buying water from trucks and the purchase of bottled water are common. Water is also commonly stored in roof tanks, which imposes both an additional cost and jeopardizes water quality. Many households also use pumps to make sure that water reaches the upper floors of houses, which imposes more costs on households. Low pressure and intermittent water supply are caused, among others, by intermittent electricity supply. Lebanon’s ongoing economic crisis has significantly disrupted the country’s energy and water sectors. A comprehensive survey of 150 municipalities across all Lebanese governorates, covering both public and private water resources, revealed that the average weekly water supply dropped from 49 hours in 2019 to 22 hours in 2023. Concurrently, the use of water tankers surged from 26% to 44%, indicating a shift in water acquisition methods.

According to the World Bank, the Lebanese water supply and sanitation sector has not achieved service provision in line with the country's level of economic development. The opportunity costs of inadequate public water supply provision amount to 1.3% of GDP every year. The environmental degradation caused by the discharge of untreated wastewater is estimated to cost an additional 1% of GDP every year.

However, the failure to provide a continuous water supply does not appear to be a major bottleneck for the Lebanese, where water storage tanks are in common use. What matters is the water quality, which is often insufficient, and that households have enough water to keep the tanks supplied, which is not always the case.

== Water resources and water use ==
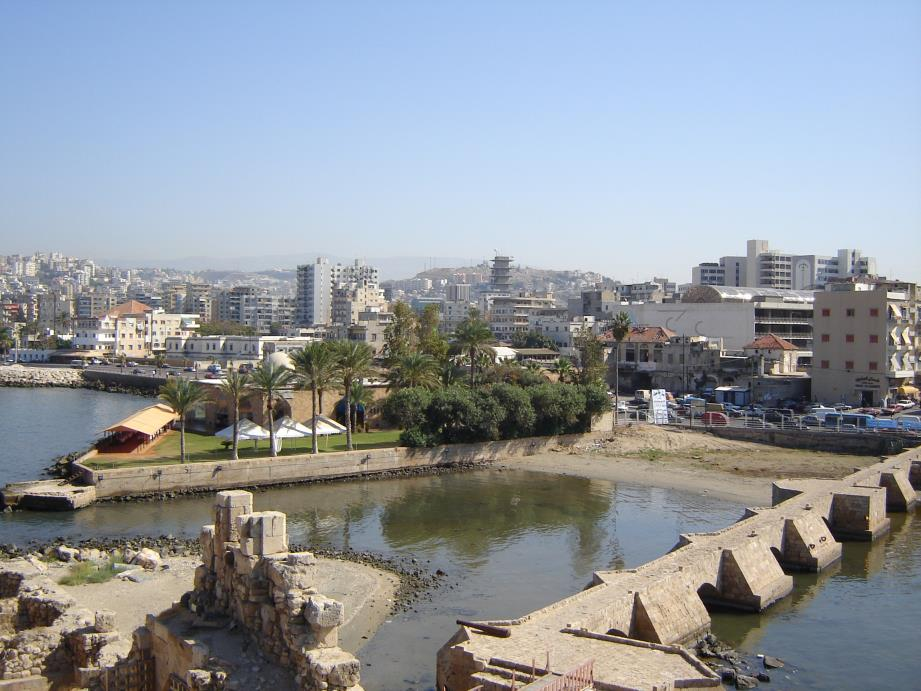
The city of Sidon has an abundance of natural wells supplying three times more water than the current needs of the city.

=== Water resource availability ===
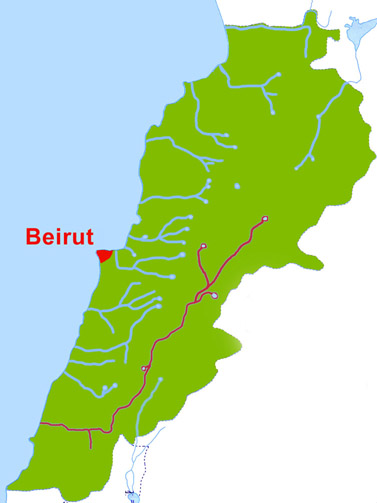
Rivers of Lebanon. The Litani River is shown in purple, the Lebanese capital Beirut in red. The Orontes River flows northwards to Syria and the Ibrahim River is the second river to the north of Beirut, flowing to the Mediterranean.

Because of limited and contradictory data, it is difficult to accurately assess water resources availability in Lebanon. While Lebanon is water-rich compared to Jordan, Israel or the Damascus region in Syria, the country's per capita renewable water resources are below the threshold of water poverty set at 1,000 cubic meter per capita and year. Only part of the floodwater in rivers can be captured economically in dams, and some groundwater flows unused to the sea. Furthermore, 0.51 billion cubic meters of water flow to Syria in an average year, and 0.16 billion cubic meters to Israel. After subtraction of these amounts, 2.6 billion cubic meters of water are available in an average year, or about 600 cubic metres (21,000 cu ft) per capita. It is not clear if water from springs is counted as part of groundwater or surface water in the above estimate. There are over 2,000 springs with a flow of 1.15 billion cubic meters, sustaining a perennial flow for 17 of the total of 40 major streams in the country. Springs and groundwater are today by far the main sources for drinking water supply in Lebanon. For example, the city of Sidon has an abundance of natural wells supplying three times more water than the current needs of the city.

The main rivers that flow entirely inside Lebanon are the Litani river (average annual flow of 0.79 million cubic meter), the Ibrahim River (0.51), the Awali River and the Damour River (both 0.3). A large share of the Litani River is diverted through the Markaba tunnel for hydropower generation to the Awali River. Since the upper watershed of the Litani River is polluted and the Awali River is due to be tapped as a source of drinking water supply for Beirut, this water transfer has implications beyond its intended use for hydropower generation.

=== Transboundary rivers ===
Two important rivers are shared with Syria and one with Israel. The Orontes River (0.48) that rises in Lebanon is shared with Syria. A 1994 agreement stipulates that Lebanon receives 80 million cubic meters of water per year "if the river flow inside Lebanon is 400 million cubic meters per year or more". This means that the risk of drought is borne by Lebanon. No new wells were allowed to be drilled in the Lebanese portion of the Orontes basin since the agreement has been signed. The El Kebir River (average flow of 0.19 million cubic meter per year) is also shared with Syria, the river itself forming part of the border between the two countries. The Hasbani River, a tributary of the Jordan River, also rises in Lebanon and is shared with Israel. Surface water flow into northern Israel from the Hasbani/Wazani complex is estimated at 160 million m3/year. There is no agreement about the sharing of the Jordan River between the two countries. When Lebanon diverted part of the Hasbani to supply a village in 2002, Israel stated that this could lead to war.

=== Pollution ===
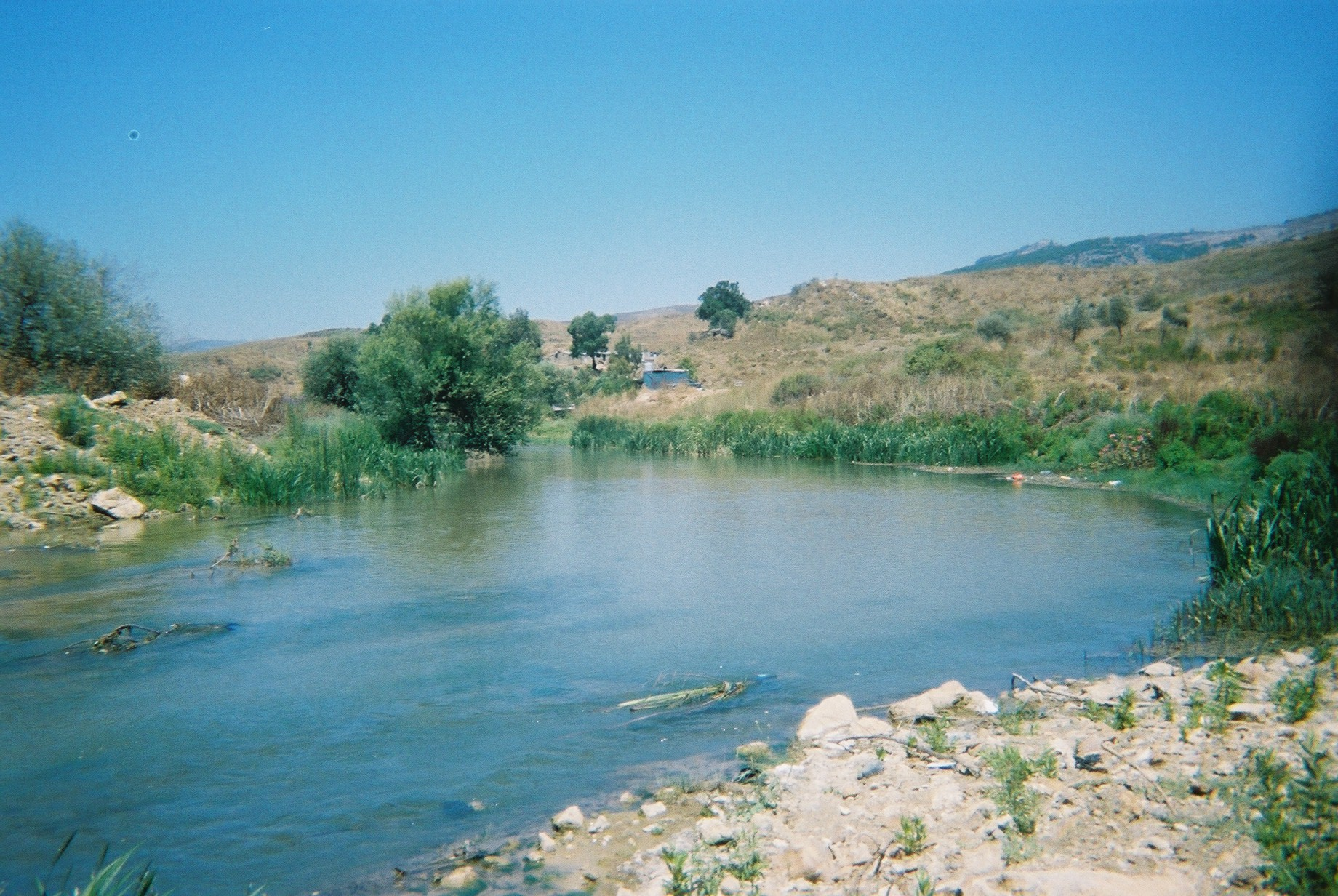
The Litani, the largest Lebanese river, is highly polluted.

Water resources are polluted by the discharge of untreated or insufficiently treated industrial and domestic wastewater, leaching from septic tanks, agricultural non-point sources such as pesticides and nitrates, hospital waste and domestic solid waste, as well as the discharge of motor oil. The Ghadir river in the South of Beirut is probably the most polluted river in the country, while the Wazzani River in South Lebanon may be the least polluted river because of limited economic activity in its basin. The discharge of untreated municipal and industrial effluents, the drainage from agricultural lands, and the uncontrolled discharge of solid wastes have considerably degraded the water quality of the Qaraoun Lake and the Litani River. Untreated industrial effluents are discharged into the lake and river from sugar-beet factories, paper factories, lead recovery plants, limestone crushers, agro-industries, poultry farms, tanneries and slaughterhouses. According to a 1998 study by the National Council of Scientific Research of Lebanon for UNICEF 60–70% percent of all natural sources were affected by bacterial contamination. An example is the Jeita spring, which has witnessed an increase in fecal coliform bacteria.

=== Water use ===
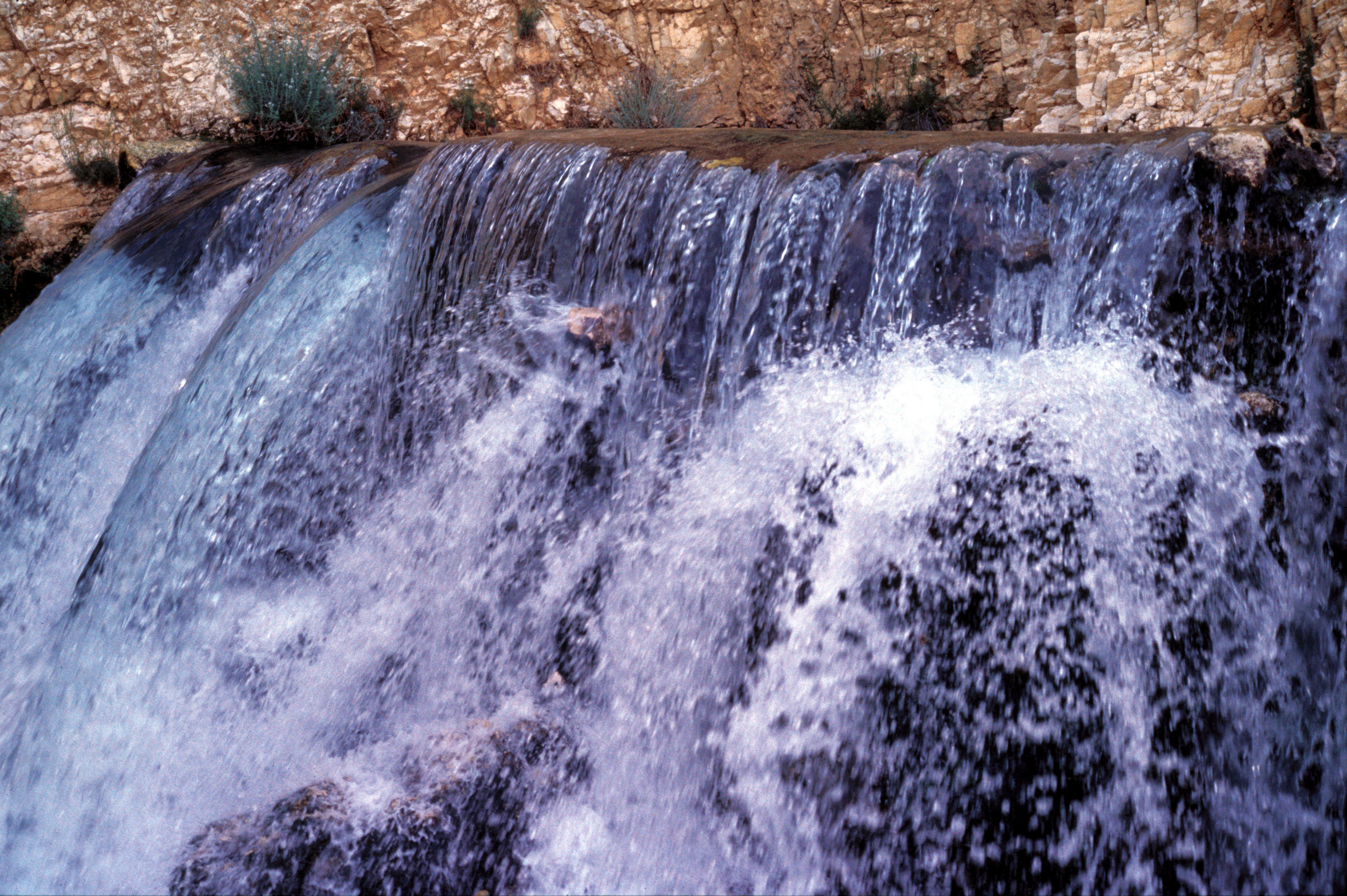
Yammouné spring in Mount Lebanon.

Data on water use in Lebanon are contradictory. Official estimates put total water use in 2010 at 1.59 billion m3, including 0.27 billion m3 (17%) from public wells for drinking water supply. In 2005, the FAO estimated water withdrawal was at 1.31 billion m3 or about 63% of economically exploitable water resources. Of this almost 60% was for agricultural purposes, 29% for municipal use and 11% for industry. The FAO does not provide the sources for these figures. Municipal use of 0.38 billion m3 would correspond to about 250 liter per capita per day based on these figures. An earlier estimate of the Ministry of Environment estimated water use at 1.29 billion m3 in 1994, including only 0.21 billion m3 for municipal use. This figure corresponds to 140 liter per capita per day, which fits well with a World Bank estimate of 150 liter per capita per day for municipal water use, ranging from 120 liter in Beirut-Mount Lebanon to 200 liter in the North.

Of households connected to the public water system, only 53% drink it. The share is lowest in Nabatieh (27%) and highest in the Bekaa (77%). The most frequently cited reasons for not drinking public water are perception of safety relating to health and hygiene, and poor taste.

=== Water losses ===
The level of non-revenue water was estimated at about 48% in 2010. It was estimated to be highest in the South (52%) and lowests in Beirut-Mount Lebanon (40%). This is high by international standards, but similar to the levels in Syria, Jordan and Turkey. Since there is little metering, it is difficult to estimate the level of non-revenue water. The share of metered connections was estimated at 16% in the Beirut-Mount Lebanon governorates in 2010, and was lower in other governorates. Most industrial and commercial water users were metered, while few residential users are metered.

=== Example: Greater Beirut water supply ===
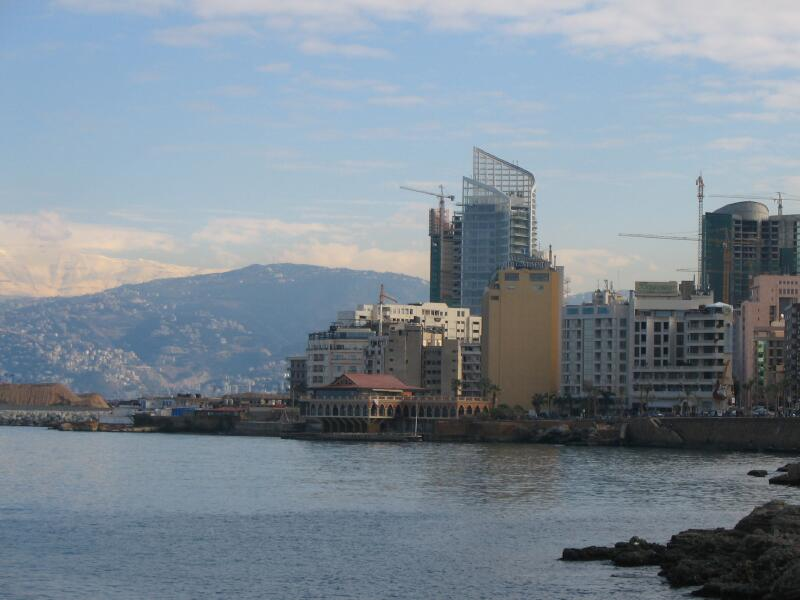
Beirut receives most of its drinking water from the Jeita spring in Mount Lebanon (shown in the background).

The public water supply system in Greater Beirut receives its water from the Jeita springs (50 million m3/year) as well as well fields in the Damour region (30 million m3/year). The Jeita spring is the source of drinking water for about 1.5 million Lebanese. Water is treated in the Dbaiye water treatment plant north of the city with a capacity of 430,000m3/day (157 million m3/year). Besides the public network, around 1,000 mostly private wells are scattered in the area of Beirut. Their depth varies between 50 and 300m and their average individual discharge is 35 liters/second. Total water supply from these wells could be higher than through the public water supply, depending on how many hours the pumps run. Overpumping from wells in the Beirut area has led to seawater intrusion into aquifers.

The government plans to tap the Awali River to the Southeast of Beirut to provide the growing capital with 90 million m3/year of additional water, more than double the current resources. The project involves the construction of a dam at Bisri, a 3 km tunnel from the river to a new water treatment plant at Ouardaniye, and a second 22 km tunnel to Khalde south of Beirut, from where water will be transported through two twin pipelines, one going North to the center of Beirut and the second northeast to Baabda. The Islamic Development Bank has agreed to finance the construction of Bisri dam in 2008, while the World Bank has approved a US$200m loan in December 2010 to partly finance the transmission tunnels and pipelines. Lebanese critics of the project argue that the Awali River and especially the Litani River, from which water is diverted to the Awali River upstream of the planned intake, are highly polluted. They also say that less expensive alternatives, such as the less polluted Damour River that is also closer to Beirut, were not considered by the government and the World Bank. As of December 2013, less than 1 percent of the loan has been disbursed and no civil works contract has been awarded.

== Modern history ==
The Lebanese infrastructure has been badly scarred by the 1975–90 Civil War. After the war the water and sanitation infrastructure was rebuilt with substantial external financial assistance. In South Lebanon, which remained under Israeli occupation until 2000, the infrastructure was gradually rebuilt as the Israeli army withdrew. Compared to the substantial investment in infrastructure, little effort was made at building the capacity of sector institutions and at establishing policies that favor the sustainability and improve the quality of services provided. Also, wastewater treatment was neglected in terms of investments compared to water supply and sewerage. Untreated wastewater was thus discharged to the sea and to rivers. No efforts were made to conserve water. Still today, Lebanon is one of the few countries in the Middle East that has almost no water meters.

=== Institutional weaknesses and lack of sustainability ===
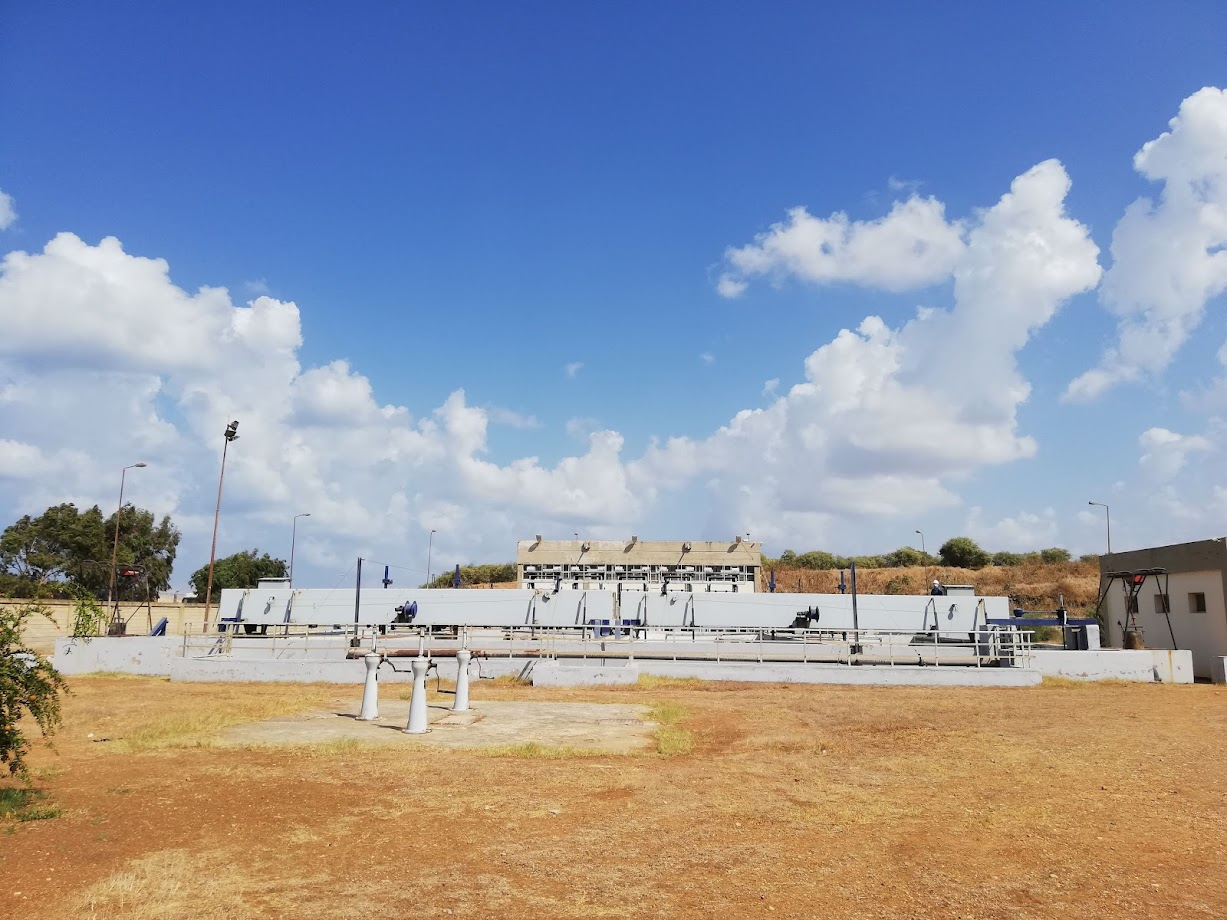
Al-Ghadir wastewater treatment plant in 2021

External financing institutions were concerned with the insufficient capacity to operate and maintain the infrastructure they were financing in Lebanon. Until 2000 there were 21 water authorities in Lebanon who were financially and technically weak. The limited sewer networks, if they existed at all, were managed by the respective municipalities, which had often even less technical and financial capacity than the water authorities. In the absence of a sanitation tariff, municipalities lacked the financial resources to operate and maintain sanitation infrastructure. The experience with wastewater treatment plants is illustrative of the difficulties encountered. For example, the operating costs for the first wastewater treatment plant in Lebanon, the Al-Ghadir plant in Beirut completed in 1997, still have to be subsidized by the government because the municipal governments in the service area (the Beirut and Baabda districts) lack the resources to do so. Furthermore, incomplete infrastructure considerably reduces the development impact of the plant. Because the construction of sewers was delayed, most of the sewage of Southern Beirut still flowed into the Mediterranean without any treatment via both the Al Ghadir River and sea outlets. The Al Ghadir plant provides only preliminary treatment, followed by discharge through a 2.6 km marine outfall. The Al-Ghadir wastewater treatment plant is located 7km to the south of Beirut Rafic Hariri International Airport. The service area of the plant covers the Governorates of Beirut and Mount Lebanon including Beirut's southern suburb and around quarter the area of Beirut in addition to parts of the districts of Chouf, Aley, and Baabda.

The second wastewater treatment plant built in Lebanon, intended for the city of Baalbek and completed in 2001, could not be put into operation, because both the sewer system and the outfall main were not completed. Wastewater treatment plants in Tripoli and Sidon were inaugurated in 2009 and 2010 respectively, both long after they were due to be completed.

=== Sector reform ===
At the national level, policy-making was fragmented between the Ministry of Energy and Water in charge of drinking water supply and the Ministry of Interior in charge of sanitation, as well as other stakeholders such as the Ministry of Finance and the Ministry of Environment. The donors thus pressed for a sector reform that would create commercially oriented regional water and sanitation companies that would achieve economies of scale. In 2000 a new water law was passed that created four Regional Water Establishments. However, the transfer of actual responsibilities to them remained slow and the water authorities continued to remain in charge of operating infrastructure. The Council for Development and Reconstruction (CDR) also remained in charge of procuring works and consulting contracts, including service contracts to operate infrastructure despite the responsibilities bestowed on the new Establishments under the Water Law.

According to a 2010 World Bank ten years after the Water Law has been passed it "has not been fully enforced and implemented, thus creating institutional uncertainty over sector responsibilities". Furthermore, "the four RWEs severely lack managerial and financial autonomy and are impeded by limited inter-agency coordination and weak central government oversight. They have not been able to effectively operate and maintain water supply networks, fully engage with the private sector, recover costs and hire qualified staff".

=== Private sector participation ===
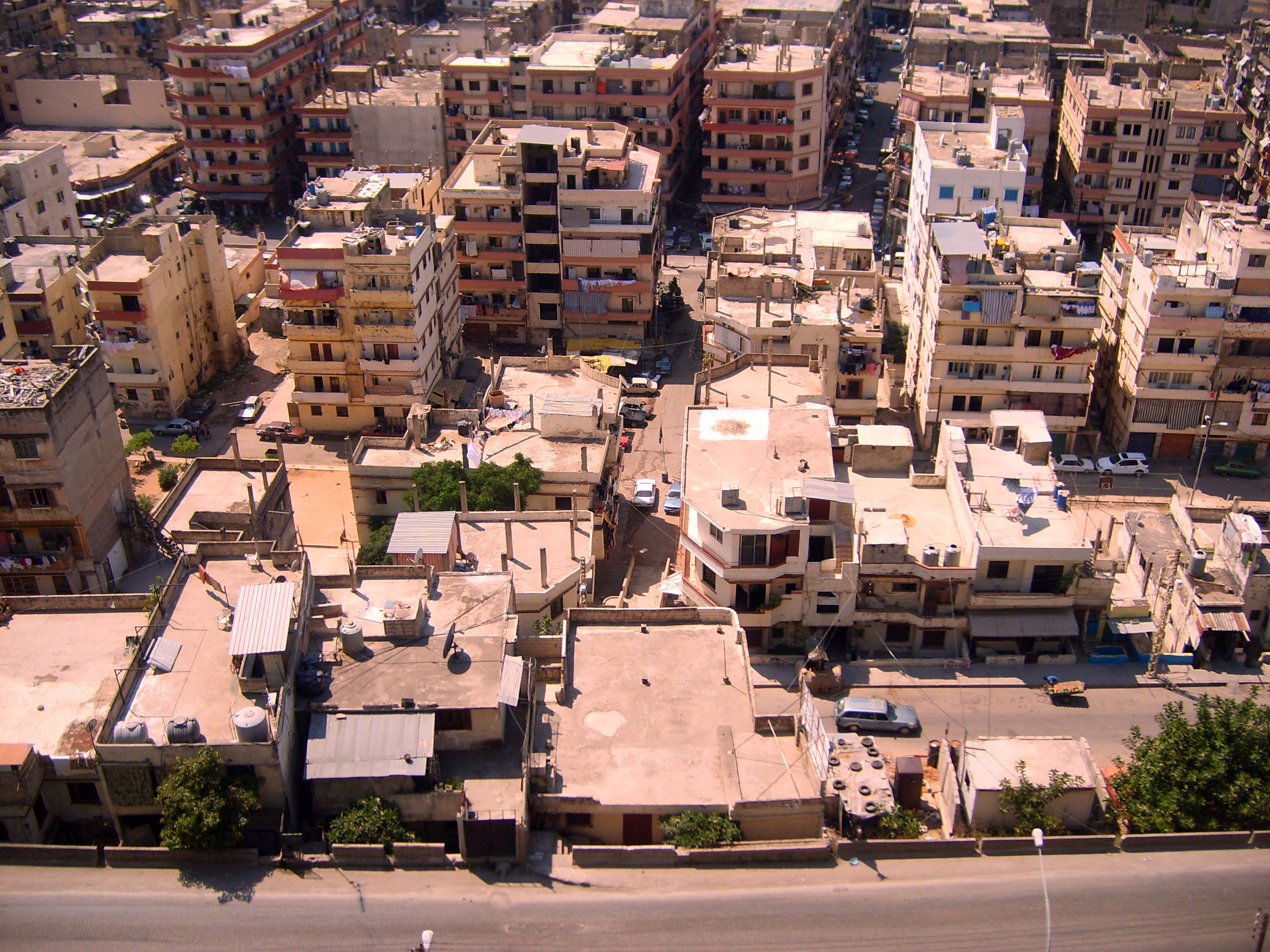
In the city of Tripoli a private French company managed the water supply between 2003 and 2007 under a management contract.

In 2003 the municipality of Tripoli signed the first and so far only management contract for water supply in Lebanon. This was done after four years of preparation that required passing a new law (Law 401) to allow public-private partnerships in water supply. The contract was awarded to the French company Ondéo-Liban, a subsidiary of Suez Environnement, after a competitive bidding process. The cost of 20 million Euro was financed by the French Development Agency. The contract included the operation, maintenance, and installation of equipment, the organization of the billing system and collection of water tariffs, the management of human and financial resources, and the supervision of the construction of a tertiary water supply network and the expansion of a water treatment plant. The private company increased the billing efficiency from 30% to 60%, reduced water rationing, mapped the network, updated the customer inventory, computerized the accounting system and trained staff. Non-revenue water was reduced from 65% to 45% and the 10-year-long water rationing in the areas of Qalamoun, Qobbe and Abi Samra was eliminated, making Tripoli the only city in Lebanon that receives water 24 hours per day. Water quality and the customer service were also improved. However, cost recovery was not achieved despite an increase in tariffs because bill collection efficiency remained low. The company was unable to introduce metering, although 40,000 meters were acquired. The contract faced a number of challenges: According to a study by the French Institute for Public-Private Partnerships, the supervisory committee was composed of former employees of the public water company who were not convinced of the usefulness of private sector participation. Despite its achievements, the management contract ended in 2007 without being extended.

=== Impact of 2006 War ===
Water infrastructure, especially in the South, was further damaged during the Israeli-Lebanese War of 2006. Israeli armed forces "destroyed water tanks, springs and pipelines, leaving most of southern Lebanon totally cut off from mains water supply in the immediate aftermath of the war", according to UN sources. The infrastructure was rebuilt after the war, partly by Hizbollah's construction company Jihad al-Bina. Foreign donors also played an important role in reconstruction, including UNICEF and Technisches Hilfswerk from Germany.

=== Impact of Syrian Civil War ===
The Syrian Civil War has exacerbated Lebanon's water stress, as Syrian refugees have expanded Lebanon's population by a quarter. Humanitarian actors have sought to improve water infrastructure, but coordinated longer-term efforts will be needed to meet current needs and guard against water crises in the future.

=== 2021 UNICEF report ===
In July 2021, UNICEF reported that water supply system in Lebanon is on the verge of total collapse, due to shortages in funding, fuel and other supplies such as chlorine and spare parts.

== Responsibility for water supply and sanitation ==
Among the key public stakeholders in the Lebanese water and sanitation sector are the Ministry of Water and Energy, which is in charge of policy and regulation; the Ministry of Finance, which provides funding and coordinates external cooperation; the Ministry of Environment; the Council for Development and Reconstruction, which is in charge of most investments in the sector; and four Regional Water Establishments, which are in charge of service provision. The sector is characterized by a significant gap between legal responsibilities of stakeholders and their actual activities. The legal text to organize the work of MEW has not been developed as of 2012. MEW's efforts are still dedicated to investment projects and not on policy and regulation. The Ministry still has units dedicated to investment studies, although these functions should have been transferred to the Water Establishments.

=== Policy and regulation: The Ministry of Water and Energy ===
Within the Lebanese government the Ministry of Water and Energy is in charge of developing and implementing policies related to water supply and sanitation. As of 2010, there was no specific policy or strategy document outlining the government's policy in the sector. The Ministry seems to focus on energy and to pay less attention to water, not to speak of sanitation.

The legal framework consists of the Water Law 221/2000 that reorganized the sector into four Regional Water Establishments. The law was amended twice shortly after it was passed: Law 241/2000 reduced the number of Regional Water Establishments from 5 to 4; and Law 337/2001 included wastewater treatment in the responsibilities of the Regional Water Establishments and of the Ministry of Water and Energy. In October 2005 some bylaws for the aforementioned laws were published.

=== Service provision: The four Regional Water Establishments ===
Map showing the six governorates of Lebanon. The two governorates of Beirut and Mount Lebanon (center of the map) form a single Regional Water Establishment, as do the governorate of Nabatiye in the South-East and the Southern governorate. The boundaries of the governorates of Beqaa in the East and of the Northern governorate correspond to the boundaries of the respective Regional Water Establishments.

Provision of drinking water supply and wastewater treatment is the responsibility of the four Regional Water Establishments that were created by the 2000 Water Law:

- Water of Beirut and Mount Lebanon – Head office in Beirut.
- Water of North Lebanon – Head office in Tripoli.
- Water of Bekaa – Head Office in Zahle.
- Water of South Lebanon – Head office in Sidon (Saida).

Although the establishments are legally responsible for irrigation and wastewater treatment, they are not engaged in these activities. There is no strategic or business planning, nor a focus on performance. There is a limited focus on IT and on asset management; customer service is fragmented. By law Lebanese water utilities should have 4,050 employees, but they actually had only 1,342 as of 2010. This is due to a hiring freeze imposed by the government. The number of employees has thus declined during the first decade of the 21st century. The gaps at the lower levels were partially filled with temporary laborers. But there are also important gaps in managerial positions. The average number of staff is less than 2 per 1000 connections, much below the regional average. The Beirut-Mount Lebanon utility has only 1.6 staff per 1000 connections. Utilities are thus unable to perform some of their basic functions. The Board members of the Water Establishments are nominated by the Cabinet upon the proposition of the Minister of Energy and Water. Municipalities have no say in the nomination of Board members. There have been only limited attempts to involve the private sector in operating water and sewer systems. A management contract for the city of Tripoli with a French firm has not been renewed after it expired (see history section).

The operation and maintenance of sewer systems remains under the responsibility of municipalities.

=== The Council for Development and Reconstruction and other national agencies ===
The Council for Development and Reconstruction (CDR) plays a major role in the sector, because it is responsible for the planning and construction of much of the public water investments and all wastewater investments in the country. It is also the implementing agency for most investment programs financed by external agencies. In addition, the Council of the South and the Central Fund for the Displaced have financed almost half of all investments in water supply in Lebanon during the late 1990s and early 2000s. The Council for the South, nominally under the Primer Minister's Office, is controlled by the mostly Shiite Amal Movement of Nabih Berri, the speaker of Lebanon's Parliament since 1992.

== Financial aspects and efficiency ==
=== Tariffs ===
Tariffs are set at different levels for each of the four regional water establishments. Within each service area tariffs are the same, although costs differ significantly. For example, Beirut receives most of its water by gravity, while in some other localities water needs to be pumped. The following table shows residential water tariffs for the four regional utilities per year and per connection for 1m3/day, excluding VAT.

Annual water tariff in 2008	Beirut -Mount Lebanon	North	Bekaa	South
Lebanese Pound	235,000	210,000	160,000	200,000
USD	159	108	108	135
USD/m3 equivalent assuming a consumption of 100 liter/capita/day and 4.5 persons per household	0.97	0.86	0.66	0.82

The level of consumption is limited to 1m3 per day by a gauge installed on all residential connections. However, actual consumption is typically lower because of intermittent supply and low water pressure. The price of water per cubic meter obviously depends on the level of consumption, which varies and is not well known. Assuming an average-size household with 4.5 members that receives 100 liter per capita per day, the price of water is almost US$1/m3 in Beirut and US$0.66/m3 in the Bekaa. Tariffs in Lebanon thus are higher than in Jordan (US$0.65/m3 including sanitation) and much higher than in Syria or in Egypt (US$0.05/m3).

The water bill has to be paid in full in advance for an entire year, which imposes a heavy burden on the poor. A household in the poorest quintile connected to the network paid an average of LBP 421,000 for water in 2008, corresponding to 3.7% of its income. More than half of these expenditures are for alternative water sources such as bottled water or water from trucks.

=== Cost recovery ===
Cost recovery varies between utilities. The collection rate (i.e. the shares of bills actually paid) in Beirut-Mount Lebanon has been consistent at almost 90%, so that the utility had accumulated over US$170 million as cash surplus in 2010. However, as of 2010 it was estimated to be only 62%. In the three other Regional Water Establishments collection rates are lower at 58% in the North, 52% in the South and only 18% in the Bekaa. In the three Establishments not even operating costs are recovered. The Government often steps in to pay for operating expenses in addition to financing investments in water infrastructure. Cost recovery is lowest for the Bekaa water company. According to a World Bank report, "there appears to be an informal understanding between water companies and households: many households don't receive their water allotment, and the water companies often don't pressure households to pay their bills." Given the current conditions and alternatives, households have stated in surveys that they are reluctant to pay more for better public service. Even where meters have been installed, there is no volumetric tariff. Flat fees are charged regardless of the existence of the meters. There thus is no financial incentive to save water. There is also no wastewater tariff.

=== Investment and financing ===
Public investment for water and wastewater sector amounted to 0.4 percent of GDP in the late 90s and early 2000s. This includes US$97m for water supply and US$32m for sanitation every year. Investments are to a large extent financed by external grants and loans. For example, 73% of CDR-executed investments in the water sector were financed by external donors and 56% of its wastewater investments.

== External cooperation ==
Many external partners have supported and continue to support the Lebanese water and sanitation sector with financial and technical assistance. These include the Arab Fund for Economic and Social Development, the European Investment Bank (EIB), France, Germany, Italy, Japan, Kuwait, Saudi Arabia, the United States and the World Bank. The donors in the water and sanitation sector tend to focus on particular regions of Lebanon: The Arab Fund focuses on the South and Beirut, The EIB on Mount Lebanon and the North, France on the North and the South, Germany on Beirut and Mount Lebanon, Japan on Mount Lebanon and the South, and the U.S. on the South. The World Bank is one of the few donors active in the Bekaa, in addition to Beirut. Most external financial assistance is in the form of loans, while technical assistance is typically in the form of grants. In the aftermath of the 2006 Israeli-Lebanese war the country received substantial additional financial assistance, including grants from countries and agencies that normally provide only loans for infrastructure development in Lebanon, such as Germany and the World Bank. Most external assistance is channeled through the government, except for U.S. assistance, which is provided directly to consulting firms working in cooperation with the government or NGOs. The United Nations also plays an important role in the Lebanese water sector, particularly through UNICEF and the United Nations Development Program (UNDP).

Donor coordination in Lebanon is the responsibility of a donor coordination unit in the Ministry of Finance, which itself is supported by UNDP. In many countries where multiple donors provide aid to the water and sanitation sector there is some form of a water-specific donor coordination mechanism. This does not seem to be the case in Lebanon.

=== Arab Fund for Economic and Social Development ===
The Arab Fund for Economic and Social Development financed a water project in Sidon and Sour (Kuwaiti Dinar 10m approved in 1996), Beirut (Kuwaiti Dinar 17m approved in 2002) and for water and wastewater in various other areas of Lebanon (Kuwaiti Dinar 25m in 2006).

=== European Union and European Investment Bank ===
The European Union supported a national water dialogue on Integrated Water Resources Management as part of the Mediterranean component of the EU Water Initiative. The dialogue, which included NGOs and the private sector in addition to government representatives and donors, was kicked off by a meeting in November 2005. Its numerous objectives included to "identify insufficiencies and bottlenecks in key prerequisites posed by donors for national investments on the water sector", the "establishment of a permanent platform for cooperation between key involved partners at the national level including donor agencies" and the endorsement of a "national roadmap". A second "consultation seminar" in April 2009 did not mention any more the objectives of the 2005 seminar, but instead offered numerous recommendations for the future, such as "to plan together the follow-up steps that can constribute to an Integrated Water Resources Management Resources Management process in the country".

The European Investment Bank financed a wastewater treatment plant in Tripoli and water treatment facilities in the touristic Keserwan District.

=== France ===
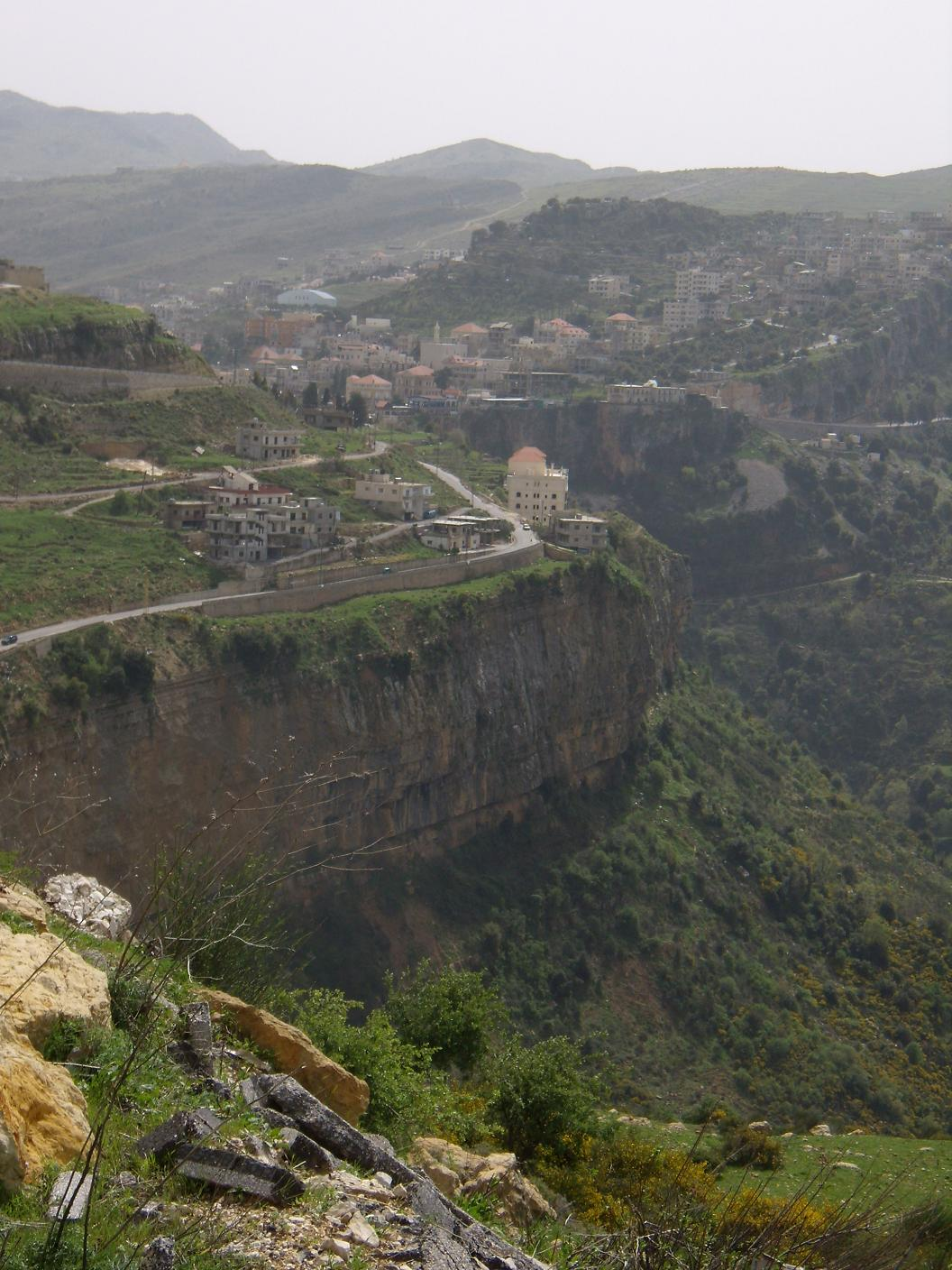
France provided a loan to rehabilitate the water supply system of Jezzine after the retreat of the Israeli army in 1999.

The French Development Agency (AFD) supports numerous water and sanitation projects in Lebanon. Under a 2m Euro loan the water distribution network in the Southern town of Jezzine was rehabilitated after the retreat of the Israeli army in 1999. Another 12m Euro loan was approved in 2001 to build an "emergency" bulk water supply line and to rehabilitate distribution networks in the Southern towns of Nabah El Tasseh and Jabal Amel. In 2007 AFD approved a small grant to rehabilitate the water network of the Southern town of Bkassine with co-financing provided by the French city Lille.

In Tripoli a 20m Euro project supported the extension of a water treatment plant and the strengthening of the distribution network since 2001, supporting the public-private partnership with the French company Ondeo initiated subsequently. A 30m Euro sanitation loan approved in 2004 allowed the construction of sewers in Tripoli. In October 2012 the Ministry of Water and AFD signed a US$90.7 million project to contribute to the financing of a US$200 million wastewater project in Keserwan District in Mount Lebanon.

=== Germany ===
Germany has committed funds to improve sanitation in localities close to the Jeita springs to reduce bacteriological pollution of this important spring that is the main water source of Beirut and other localities. It also supported sanitation in Beirut and a reconstruction project in the South It also provides technical assistance to support water sector reform through a project that ran from 2008 to the end of 2013, implemented by GIZ (ex-GTZ). The project aimed to strengthen the regulatory capacity of MEW, the technical and management capacities of the four Water Establishments and to improve relations between customers and the Establishments. Among other activities, it systematically collected data on performance indicators (benchmarking), prepared business plans, valued fixed assets and identified all customers. The project also established water balances in pilot areas where customer meters had been installed, carried out customer satisfaction surveys in the same areas, and prepared the ground for the adoption for consumption-based tariffs. However, these tariffs are not yet applied. It also tried to prepare the Establishments for taking over their responsibilities in wastewater management through a "Declaration of Principles towards Sustainable Wastewater Management". However, the Establishments have not yet taken over this responsibility.

The German public disaster relief organization Technisches Hilfswerk (THW), which works mainly through volunteers, provided emergency assistance in the South only days after the 2006 hostilities ended. It first installed a laboratory and carried out drinking water analyses. Afterwards it installed chlorination equipment in 30 tanks benefiting 15,000 people, constructed a water tower and repaired three other water towers. THW worked on behalf of the German government, the Humanitarian Aid department of the European Commission (ECHO) and UNICEF.

=== Islamic Development Bank ===
The Islamic Development Bank has agreed to finance the construction of Bisri dam in 2008. The dam on the Awali River will store water that is to be supplied as drinking water to Beirut.

=== Italy ===
Italy supports the Lebanese water and sanitation sector through various technical assistance grants, including a US$1.8m grant approved in 2010 to create a "Lebanese center for water management and preservation" and a hydrological study in an unspecified area in cooperation with UNDP. The Center for Water Management and Preservation, to be located in the Ministry of Water and Energy and to be established with the help of UNDP and Italian funding over a 2-year period, is supposed to "coordinate on-going water programmes", "develop an action plan on sustainable water policy" and to achieve "national public awareness raising", among other things. Lebanon also received water monitoring equipment from Italy to be installed on the Orontes River, as well as the Hasbani River and the Wazzani spring. The two latter flow into Israel.

=== Japan ===
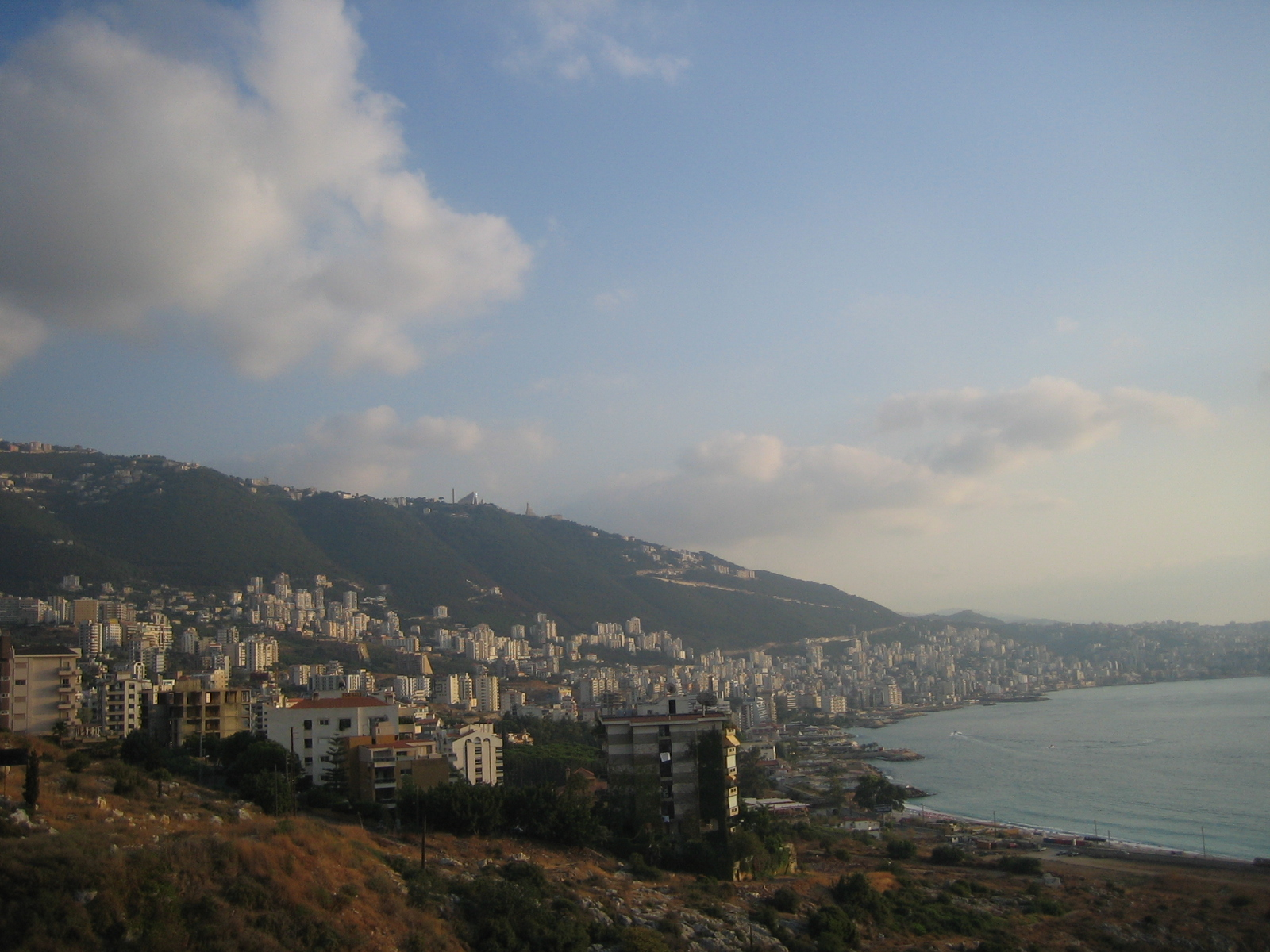
Japan supports the expansion of water supply facilities in the Keserwan District, including the city of Jounieh shown here.

Japan provided a soft loan (25 years maturity, 7 grace years, 2.5% interest) of about US$120m for wastewater collection and treatment in Sidon and water supply in Keserwan District in 1996. In Sidon the project was to finance a sewer network with a length of 38 km, a trunk sewer with a length of 7 km, two sewage pumping stations and a preliminary treatment plant with a capacity of 33,600m3/day. Later the design was changed to add the financing of a 2 km sea outfall, increase the capacity of the treatment plant to 45,000 m3/day, increase the number of pumping stations to 13 and to reduce the length of sewers financed. The construction of the wastewater treatment plant was finished in 2006, but it became operational only in 2010 when at least some of the trunk sewers were finally connected to the plant. In Keserwan District Japan finances the expansion of a water intake at the Al Madiq spring, 50 km of transmission mains, 13 pumping stations 22 service reservoirs and 202 km of distribution mains. The project will alleviate water scarcity in a number of villages where demand is twice as high as available supply. As of 2008, a centerpiece of the project—a 4 km tunnel with a diameter of almost 4m—was under construction.

=== Kuwait ===
The Kuwait Fund for Arab Economic Development has provided 55m Kuwaiti Dinar (US$187m) in soft loans (2.5% interest, 24–30 years maturity) for water supply and sanitation between 1993 and 2010. The projects are located in Beirut, the South and the Matn District in Mount Lebanon governorate. The latest water project supported by Kuwait in Lebanon is the Qaisamani Dam, which will provide 35 villages in Mount Lebanon with drinking water and for which a US$19m loan agreement was signed in 2010.

=== United States ===
USAID provides US$8m technical assistance and training, limited-scale infrastructure activities, and specialized equipment for the Litani River Authority, transforming the Authority in a "river basin agency". It also provides US$19.5m to improve the management, operations and services of the four Regional Water Establishments, including a "national strategic water and wastewater master plan". Memoranda of understanding about both programs were signed in June 2010.

The first project builds on a previous U.S.-supported project that helped the South Lebanon Water Establishment to become—according to the consulting firm who works on the project, DAI—"a model for the other water establishments in Lebanon." The project introduced a business plan and a financial model for the utility. It attempted to replicate the positive experience in the South to the Beirut/Mount Lebanon Water Establishment, but faced difficulties there because of a lack of support from management. The project also tried to promote public-private partnerships (PPPs) through the establishment of a PPP unit in the Ministry of Energy and Water. The work of the unit has had little impact and "all activities related to PPP (were put) on hold due to the absence of a clear vision regarding PPP in the country". The project also aimed to develop a new tariff strategy, but actually carried out an assessment of current revenues and scenarios for future revenues. Furthermore, substantial training was carried out and a South Lebanon Wastewater Master Plan was developed. Last but not least production and zone meters were installed in Sidon, the only city in the South and one of the few localities in the entire country that has customer meters. However, it is unclear if the meters are actually being read. The final report of the project concludes, among other things, that there is a lack of sufficient qualified staff in the regional water establishments, a lack of accurate operational and financial data, and a lack of local firms specialized in the development and implementation of financial and accounting systems.

=== World Bank ===
The World Bank has supported the Lebanese water and sanitation sector since 1993 when it approved an Emergency Reconstruction and Rehabilitation Project. With the help of the project water systems in 97 communities were rehabilitated or built, as were 98 small sewerage systems. After the Israeli withdrawal from South Lebanon, 5 additional water and sewerage systems were rehabilitated benefiting 140 communities. The project also rehabilitated or expanded three large water productions and distribution systems and wastewater treatment plants Baalbek, Metn and Barouk. Because complementary works, to be financed by other sources, had not been completed on time, these facilities were inoperative as of 2006. In particular, the Baalbek wastewater treatment plant (13,000 m3/day capacity), completed in early 2002, was not connected to the sewerage system. The World Bank continued to support water supply and sanitation in Baalbek through a US$43.5m loan approved in 2002. This was followed by a US$15m emergency grant in 2007 to support the rehabilitation and expansion of water supply systems in five villages in the Western Bekaa Valley. In December 2010, the World Bank approved a US$200m loan to support the Greater Beirut Water Supply Project. The World Bank had to cancel a previous loan for submarine treated wastewater outfalls in Kesrouan and Sour approved in 1998 after the government had not ratified the corresponding loan agreements.

=== Non-governmental organizations ===
A number of foreign and local non-governmental organizations (NGOs) are active in the Lebanese water and sanitation sector. For example, NGOs such as the YMCA, the Mercy Corps, CHF International and the Pontifical Mission built 13 small wastewater treatment plants throughout the country during the 1990s with funding from USAID.
