= Faraya =

Faraya, Lebanon فاريا، لبنان
- Municipality
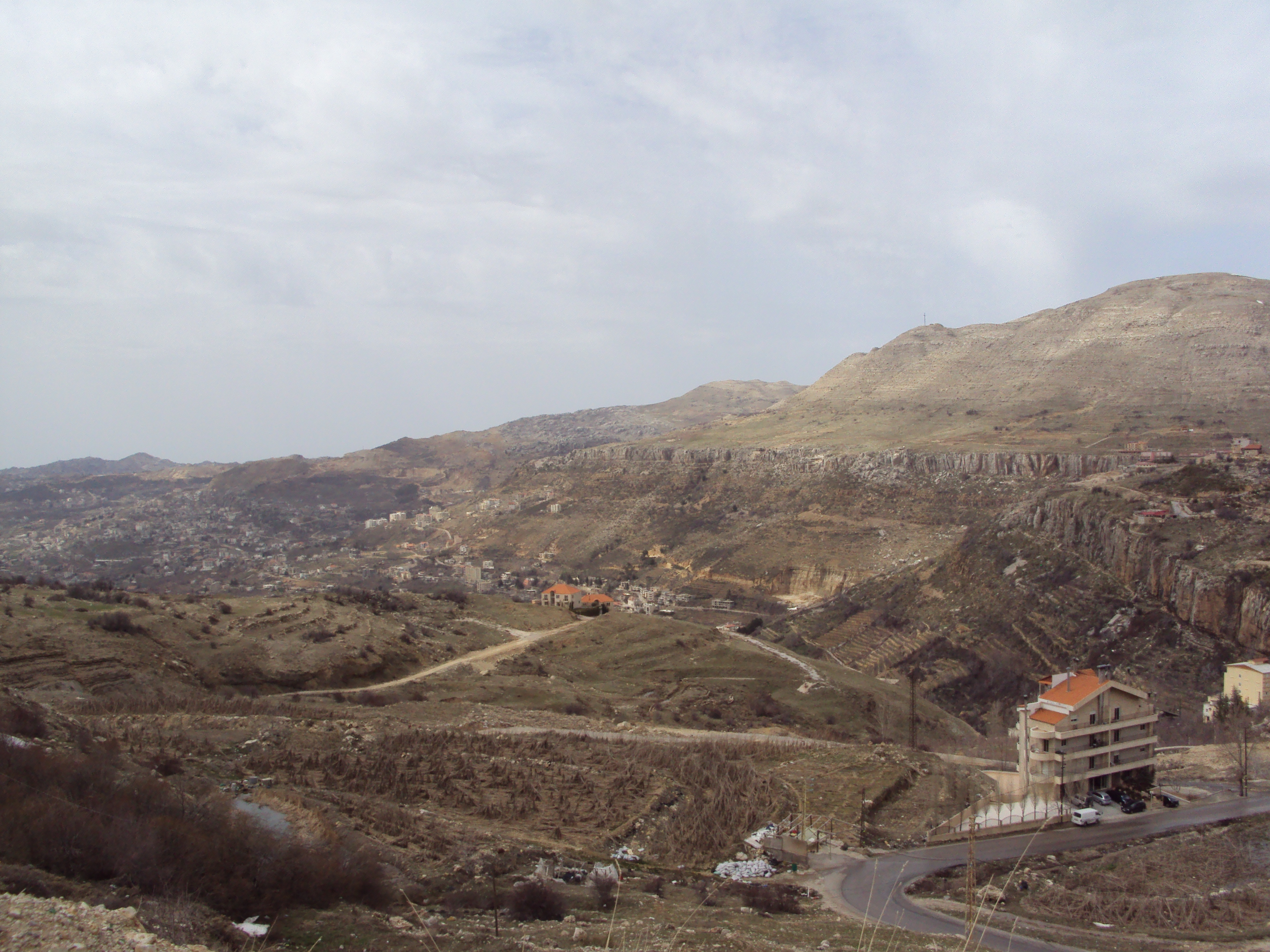
- View of Faraya, 2010

- Location in Lebanon
- Coordinates: 34°0′44″N 35°49′26″E
- Country: Lebanon
- Governorate: Mount Lebanon
- District: Keserwan

Area
  - Total: 8.7 km^{2} (3.4 sq mi)
- Highest elevation: 2,000 m (6,600 ft)
- Lowest elevation: 1,200 m (3,900 ft)

Population
  - Total: 2,700
  - Density: 310/km^{2} (800/sq mi)
- Time zone: UTC+2 (EET)
  - Summer (DST): UTC+3 (EEST)
- Dialing code: +961

Faraya (Arabic: فاريا, romanized: Fārayā) is a village and municipality in the Keserwan District of the Keserwan-Jbeil Governorate, Lebanon. It is located 46 kilometers north of Beirut. Elevation start from 1290 meters to 2000 meters above sea level and its total land area is 870 hectares. Faraya's inhabitants are predominantly Maronite Christians.

== History ==
According to the 17th-century historian and Maronite patriarch Istifan al-Duwayhi, Faraya was settled by Shia Muslims from Baalbek in the 16th century. Ottoman tax records, which did not differentiate between Muslim communities, indicate the village had 44 Muslim and 17 Christian households and one imam in 1523, 29 Muslim and 9 Christian households in 1530, and 43 Muslim and 16 Christian households in 1543.

During the civil war Faraya was a Lebanese Forces (LF) stronghold. In 1989 it was reported that the LF had a secret base in Wadi Chabrouh, north of Faraya, where they held a number of Frog missiles.

In 2017, Lebanon's largest statue of Saint Charbel was inaugurated making it one of the most visited pilgrimage sites in Lebanon.

== Geography ==
The name "Faraya" stands for "The land of fruits and vegetables" in Phoenician due to its soil fertility. Faraya is located in the Keserwan District in Lebanon, 42 km away from Beirut, and 20 km away from Jounieh, Faraya has an altitude ranging from 1200 m to 2000 m. The road to Faraya from the coastal highway passes through Ajaltoun, Ashqout, Faytroun, Mairouba, and Hrajel and 5 min to mzaar ski resort

In 2007, the Chabrouh Dam was inaugurated creating one of the highest reservoirs in the Middle-east region, but as a result, flooded more than three quarter of the orchards.

=== Climate ===
In winter, Faraya has a cold climate with snow accumulations that can reach more than 1.5 metres (5 ft) and temperature drops to −6 °C (21 °F) or lower in winter. In summer temperatures can reach over 30 °C (86 °F) in

Climate data for Faraya
Month	Jan	Feb	Mar	Apr	May	Jun	Jul	Aug	Sep	Oct	Nov	Dec	Year
Mean daily maximum °C (°F)	7.8 (46.0)	8.4 (47.1)	11.4 (52.5)	15.9 (60.6)	20.3 (68.5)	24.8 (76.6)	26.6 (79.9)	27.8 (82.0)	25.0 (77.0)	21.1 (70.0)	15.7 (60.3)	10.3 (50.5)	17.9 (64.2)
Daily mean °C (°F)	4.2 (39.6)	4.7 (40.5)	7.1 (44.8)	11.1 (52.0)	15.1 (59.2)	19.4 (66.9)	21.1 (70.0)	22.3 (72.1)	19.5 (67.1)	16.0 (60.8)	11.4 (52.5)	6.7 (44.1)	13.2 (55.8)
Mean daily minimum °C (°F)	0.7 (33.3)	1.0 (33.8)	2.9 (37.2)	6.4 (43.5)	9.9 (49.8)	14.1 (57.4)	15.7 (60.3)	16.9 (62.4)	14.0 (57.2)	11.0 (51.8)	7.2 (45.0)	3.1 (37.6)	8.6 (47.4)
Average precipitation mm (inches)	269 (10.6)	231 (9.1)	206 (8.1)	87 (3.4)	34 (1.3)	2 (0.1)	1 (0.0)	1 (0.0)	6 (0.2)	39 (1.5)	119 (4.7)	222 (8.7)	1,217 (47.7)
Source: Climate-Data.org

== Bibliography ==
- Bakhit, Muhammad Adnan Salamah (February 1972). The Ottoman Province of Damascus in the Sixteenth Century (PhD). School of Oriental and African Studies, University of London.
