= Litani River Dam =

Dam in Lebanon

Coordinates: 33.5483°N 35.6894°E

- Interactive map of Litani River Dam
- Country: Lebanon

The Albert Naccache River Dam (el Wauroun Dam, Qaraoun Dam, or Litani River Dam) was initiated in 1959 (construction completed in the 1960s), and created the largest artificial lake in Lebanon, Lake Qaraoun. The area of the lake is about 12 square kilometers, and the capacity the lake is able to hold is about 220 million cubic meters. The height of the dam is 60 meters, the length is 1,350 meters, and the width is 162 meters, at most. As a whole, the size of the dam is about 2 million cubic meters.

== Location ==
The artificial lake (lake Qaraoun) is situated close to Qaraoun, on the stretch before Nabatiya.

== Structure ==
The Litany dam is also equipped with two taps to empty the lake. The experts who administered the study of the Litani project all agreed that the location selected by the engineer, Ibrahim Abdul Aal, and the geologist, Dubertret, for the construction of the dam between Qaraoon and Suhmur, was the most sufficient geographical location and that is why it was authorized as the project venue.

== Water use ==
A service gallery, which is the pipe foundation, of 6,503 meters carries the water to the underground hydroelectric station. The water then goes through transformers and produces a maximum of 185 megawatts. The Litani dam will eventually provide local irrigation for 31,000 hectares of farmland in South Lebanon and 8,000 hectares in the Beqaa Valley, with a total of almost 40,000 hectares of irrigation.
